= Nondualism =

Nonconceptual awareness and interconnectedness

Nondualism, also called nonduality, is a fuzzy concept (Note: A fuzzy concept is an idea of which the boundaries of application can vary considerably according to context or conditions, instead of being fixed once and for all. (Bělohlávek & Klir 2011; Haack 1996): According to Loy 2012, p. 7, it is best to speak of various "nondualities" or theories of nonduality.; Hartelius 2015, p. v: "From a philosophical perspective nonduality is a particularly imprecise notion, first because there are many types of dualism, and second because nonduality negates an unspecifid dualism in an unspecifid way."; Hartelius 2015, p. v: "some of the popular discourse on nonduality is little more than an immersion in paradoxical language [...] The more mysterious the defiition of nonduality, the easier it becomes to claim the superiority and universality of this notion, and argue that every poetic or mystical or spiritual or intuitive expression is pointing to the same thing [...] In all of this, it is doubtful that I have conveyed anything of value to a listener, other than an opportunity to experience the cognitive not-knowing that may come from paradoxical statements."; Gibbons 2019 notes that "Terms such as "awakening" and "enlightenment" and "nonduality" undoubtedly mean different things to different people," and states that "[i]n the widest sense these kinds of experiences fall under what is typically called in the west "mystical" experience." Gibson further notes that "the term "nondual" has in many circles become virtually synonymous with "spirituality" itself."Gibbons 2019; Volker 2021, p. 1768: "The notion of nonduality encompasses a wide range of philosophical concepts from subjective idealism to a variety of different forms of monism and austere absolutism, from panentheistic realism to radical phenomenalism and panpsychism."; Sydnor 2023, p. 1: "Yet "nondualism" as a word occupies a large semantic field." Sydnor 2023, p. 2: "The term is polyvalent, bordering on the unwieldy."; Sydnor 2023, pp. 4–5: "The concept of nonduality is further specified [by Volker] by differentiating between asymmetric and symmetric forms of nondualism, linking asymmetric nondualism to apophatic monism ar transcendental absolutism, while linking symmetric nondualism to pluralistic monism or unity-in-difference [...] these two notions encompass a broad variety of metaphysical positions.") originating in Indian philosophy and religion, (Note: Origins: * According to Loy 1988, p. 3, nondualism is primarily an Eastern way of understanding: "...[the seed of nonduality] however often sown, has never found fertile soil [in the West], because it has been too antithetical to those other vigorous sprouts that have grown into modern science and technology. In the Eastern tradition [...] we encounter a different situation. There the seeds of seer-seen nonduality not only sprouted but matured into a variety (some might say a jungle) of impressive philosophical species. By no means do all these [Eastern] systems assert the nonduality of subject and object, but it is significant that three which do – Buddhism, Vedanta and Taoism – have probably been the most influential. Volker 2023, p. 51: "Given the etymology of the term nonduality and its origin in Indian philosophy...") where it is used in various, related contemplative philosophies that aim to negate dualistic thinking or conceptual proliferation (prapanca) (Note: P[r]apanca & misprapapanca/aprapanca: * Andrew Olendzki: "P[r]apanca is "the tendency of the mind to 1) spread out from and elaborate upon any sense object that arises in experience, smothering it with wave after wave of mental elaboration, 2) most of which is illusory, repetitive, and even obsessive, 3) which effectively blocks any sort of mental calm or clarity of mind." * Nisprapapanca/aprapanca: see Volker 2023, p. 57: the stopping of discursive thought or conceptualisation. * Buswell & Lopez 2014, p. 593, entry Nisprapanca: ""conceptual nonproliferation" or "absence of superimposition," the transcendent (LOKOTTARA) state of mind that is characteristic of the enlightened noble person (ĀRYA). Nisprapañca refers to the absence of that which is fanciful, imagined, or superfluous, especially in the sense of the absence of a quality that is mistakenly projected onto an object. This false quality is called PRAPAÑCA [...] In the YOGĀCĀRAschool of Mahāyāna Buddhism, nisprapañca refers to the absence of the misapprehension of sensory objects as separate from the perceiving consciousness, and in the MADHYAMAKA school it refers to the absence of perceiving objects as endowed with SVABHĀVA." * Aprapanca: "(that which is) beyond discursive thinking," Gaganagañjaparipṛcchā, the eighth chapter of the Mahāsaṃnipāta Sūtra.]) and thereby realize nondual awareness, 'that which is beyond discursive thinking', a state of consciousness described in contemplative traditions as a background field of unified, immutable awareness that exists prior to conceptual thought. (Note: According to Michael Taft, as quoted by Grosso (2018, p. 87), "[n]ondual awareness is an experience. Nondualism is a philosophy that talks about that experience and its meaning.")

The English term "nonduality" is derived from the Sanskrit Hindu term "advaita" (अद्वैत), "not-two" or "one without a second", meaning that only Brahman, 'the one', is ultimately real while 'the world', or the multiplicity of thought-constructs, 'the second', is not fully real; and from the Buddhist term advaya, which is also literally translated as "not two" and has various applications, including the Madhyamaka negation of thinking in opposites such as ordinary, conventional truth versus ultimate truth, and in Yogachara the deconstruction of the "apprehension of sensory objects as separate from the perceiving consciousness".

A perennialist view posits that nondual awareness, despite fundamental differences in the explanatory frameworks, is a common essence in various religious traditions. (Note: Since the late 1970s this common core thesis has been challenged, and the perennial position is "largely dismissed by scholars" but "has lost none of its popularity".) According to this view, nondual awareness is not only paradigmatic for Hindu advaita-traditions including Advaita Vedanta and Kashmir Shaivism, (Note: Purusha, Turiya, sahaja, self-luminosity) and Buddhist advaya-traditions including Yogachara, Madhyamaka, Zen and Dzogchen, (Note: luminous mind, Nirvana, emptiness, pariniṣpanna, nature of mind, Buddha-nature, rigpa) but can also be found in Taoist philosophy, and in Western philosophy, Christian mysticism, and Sufism.

Nondualism is also used to refer to the satsang movement, also called neo-advaita, for which nonduality is a central tenet, emphasizing sudden awakening or insight. The term may also refer to monism and nonplurality, the idea of a unitive essence behind the multiplicity of distinct entities. (Note: The equation of nondualism with monism has been questioned, and Alan Watts made a distinction between monism, which may conceptualize reality as a unified whole, and nondual awareness as a direct experience or intuition of "the Real", fundamentally "nonconceptual" and "not graspable in an idea," pointing beyond conceptual frameworks altogether. Likewise, according to Harteliux "interconnectedness is not the nondual teaching of Advaita Vedanta.") Related definitions include interconnectedness (Note: See, for example, Joan Tollifson, What is nonduality?) interdependence, (Note: See, for example, Jon Paul Sydnor (2023), Joy in the Earth. A Christian Cosmology Based on Agapic Nondualism p.315-317, in The Wiley Blackwell Companion to Comparative Theology: A Festschrift in Honor of Francis X. Clooney, SJ, edited by Axel M. Oaks Takacs, Joseph L. Kimmel.) and holism or 'wholism', (Note: This idea is expressed by Loy when referring to "the nonplurality of the world," stating that "we experience the world itself dualistically [...]": as a collection of discrete objects [...] The negation of dualistic thinking leads to the negation of this way of experiencing the world [...] the world itself is nonplural, because all the things "in" the world are not really distinct from each other but together constitute some integral whole." See Wouter Hanegraaff, New Age Religion and Western Culture: Esotericism in the Mirror of Secular Thought, p.119-120, ""The meaning of holism") the idea that "all the things 'in' the world are not really distinct from each other but together constitute some integral whole". Further definitions are the rejection of thinking in binary opposites such as the mind–body dualism, while "nondualism" is also used as a synonym for mysticism, (Note: Mysticism is the unio mystica or "spiritual marriage," popularily understood as 'union with God' but more aptly referring to a consciousness of 'the presence of God'.) mystical experience, and spirituality.

== Etymology ==
"Nondualism" and "nonduality" are the translation of the Sanskrit terms advaita and advaya.

"Advaita" (अद्वैत) is from Sanskrit roots a, "not"; dvaita, "customarily translated as dual". As Advaita, it is usually translated as "not-two" or "one without a second", and most commonly as "nondualism", "nonduality" or "nondual", invoking the notion of a dichotomy. Fabian Volker, following Paul Hacker explains that dvaita does not mean "duality" but "the state in which a second is present", the second here being synonymous with prapanca, "conceptual proliferation" and, with jagat, "the world". Advaita thus means that only Brahman, 'the one', is ultimately real, while the phenomenal world, or the conceptual multiplicity, 'the second', is not fully real. The term thus does not emphasize two instances, but the notion that the second instance is not fully real, and advaita is better translated as "that which has no second beside it" instead of "nonduality", denying multiplicity and the proliferation of concepts "that tend to obscure the true state of affairs". (Note: According to Anantanand Rambachan, advaita describes the relation between Brahman, the origin of everything, and the world and the individual self. This relation is neither one nor two. It is not "one," because "[t]he world, as an effect, originates from Brahman and is dependent on Brahman for its existence." But it is also not "two", because Brahman is "the ultimate ontological ground of the world and the self".)

"Advaya" (Sanskrit: अद्वय, Tibetan: gNis-med, Chinese: 不二 bù'èr, Japanese: fu-ni) is also a Sanskrit word that means "identity, unique, not two, without a second", and typically refers to sunyata ('emptiness') and the two truths doctrine of Mahayana Buddhism, especially Madhyamaka, and the negation of the conceptual duality between observer and observed in Yogacara. The term prapanca, conceptual proliferation and the creation of a multi-faceted world, is also used in these discourses. Hookham renders nisprapanca as "nonconceptual", explaining:

...terms such as Appearance-Emptiness, Bliss-Emptiness, Clarity-Emptiness, Awareness-Emptiness both-at-once (yuganaddha) are used to refer to the Ultimate (Paramartha) Nature-of-Mind. "Emptiness" in these combinations means nonceptual (nisprapanca) space or openness. In other words, though there is nothing to grasp (conceptually), Appearance, Bliss, Clarity or Awareness is still vividly present and is the Non-conceptual (Nis-prapanca) Reality.

"Dual" comes from Latin "duo", two, prefixed with "non-" meaning "not"; "non-dual" means "not-two". The English term "nondual" was informed by early translations of the Upanishads in Western languages other than English from 1775. These terms have entered the English language from literal English renderings of "advaita" subsequent to the first wave of English translations of the Upanishads. These translations commenced with the work of Müller (1823–1900), in the monumental Sacred Books of the East (1879). He rendered "advaita" as "Monism", as have many recent scholars. However, some scholars state that advaita is not really monism. According to Alan Watts, monism often leads to conceptualizing reality as a single entity, whereas nondualism points beyond conceptual frameworks entirely.

== Definitions ==
=== Types of nonduality ===
Nonduality is a fuzzy concept, for which many definitions can be found. Gibbons notes that "Terms such as 'awakening' and 'enlightenment' and 'nonduality' undoubtedly mean different things to different people", and states that "[i]n the widest sense these kinds of experiences fall under what is typically called in the west 'mystical' experience." Gibbons further notes that "the term 'nondual' has in many circles become virtually synonymous with "spirituality" itself".

==== T. R. V. Murti ====
T. R. V. Murti gives the distinction between advaita and Madhyamikya advaya as follows:

A distinction ... must be made between the advaya of the Madhyamika and the advaita of the Vedanta although in the end it may turn out to be one of approach.
Advaya is knowledge free from the duality of the extremes (antas or drstis) of 'Is' and 'Is not', Being and Becoming, etc. It is knowledge freed of conceptual distinctions.
Advaita is knowledge of a differenceless entity - Brahman (Pure Being).

Murti's distinction has been described as a distinction between ontology versus epistemology, and has been referred to by other authors.

==== David Loy ====
According to David Loy, since there are similar ideas and terms in a wide variety of spiritualities and religions, ancient and modern, no single definition for the English word "nonduality" can suffice, and perhaps it is best to speak of various "nondualities" or theories of nonduality. Loy sees non-dualism as a common thread in Taoism, Mahayana Buddhism, and Advaita Vedanta, and distinguishes "Five Flavors Of Nonduality": (Note: In light of Volker 2023, Loy's typology would be as follows: 1. . Nonconceptual awareness, including Advaita's Brahman as the one Real, Madhyamaka's absolute-relative non-difference, and Yogachara's subject-object non-difference; 2. . Integral wholeness, interconnectedness; 3. . Negation of binary oppositions; 4. . Mysticism and divine presence.)

1. The nondifference of subject and object, where the observer and the observed are ultimately inseparable. This idea is central to Buddhist Zen, Advaita Vedanta, and Taoism, which describe reality as a unified field of experience beyond conceptual thought.
2. The nonplurality of the world – Although we experience the world dualistically, "as a collection of discrete objects [...] the world itself is nonplural, because all the things "in" the world are not really distinct but from each other but together constitute some integral whole." According to Loy, "[t]he negation of dualistic thinking leads to the negation of this [dualistically] way of experiencing the world." According to Loy, this is expressed in notions like Brahman, One Mind, Tao, and Dharmakaya, moving away from nonduality in the world to another kind of nonduality. (Note: Advaita Vedanta's assertion is that Brahman alone is real, with the world appearing as an illusory manifestation created by conceptual proliferation, and not some expression of "interconnectedness.") (Note: Yet, Loy then states that "the unity of everything "in" the world means that each thing is a manifestation of a "spiritual" whole," referring to One Mind and Brahman, thus moving from interconnectedness to advaita and advaya, that is, aprapanca.)
3. The negation of dualistic thinking – Some nondual traditions reject binary oppositions such as self/other, good/evil, or existence/non-existence. The yin-yang symbol of Taoism reflects this transcendence of opposites.
4. The identity of phenomena and the absolute – Nonduality in Madhyamaka Buddhism and the two truths doctrine asserts that phenomena (relative truth) and emptiness (ultimate truth) are inseparable. This differs from monistic nonduality, as it denies a singular, unchanging essence.
5. Mysticism and divine unity – Some mystical traditions describe a direct experience of unity between the individual and the divine, such as Sufism's fana (self-annihilation), Christian mystical union, and Kabbalistic Ein Sof. (Note: This perspective differs from nondual frameworks that reject theism altogether.)

Henning & Henning elaborate on Loy's subject-object nonduality, noting that humans are able to "mental self-awareness and subjectivity," which creates a "[d]ualistic mental experience—in which the mental “subject” is separated from the “objects” in the subject's environment," which is "a precondition for our ability to think abstractly, perceive time, construct narratives, invent tools, and use symbols." In "absolute nonduality," this "subject-object/perceiver-perceived relationship breaks down."

Like, Michael Taft, as quoted by Chris Grosso, explains that nondualism points to the working of the brain, which creates mental representations out of its sensory input, realizing that "you are simply the awareness of those sensory signals and are none of the content."

Loy sees the nondifference of subject and object as the "core doctrine" of nonduality, quoting Yasutani roshi as giving an example of this nonduality:

"When I heard the temple bell ring, suddenly there was no bell and no I, just sound." In other words, he no longer was aware of a distinction between himself, the bell, the sound, and the universe. This is the state you have to reach.

He also refers to pariniṣpanna-svabhāva, a Yogachara-term meaning "fully accomplished," "just pure seeing [...] devoid of all concepts," "experience without subject-object duality." Further references from Loy are to Giuseppe Tucci, who states that the awakening of shes rab (prajna) is the final objective in Tibetan Buddhism, transcending the subject-object dichotomy. Another reference is to D. T. Suzuki as stating that satori is "the realization of nonduality, and to the story of Hui Neng, "which presents "the Zen concept of "no mind" (Ch. wu-shin, Jap. mushin), which asserts, in effect, the nonduality of subject and object." (Note: Loy 1988, p. 32: "the Zen concept of "no mind" (Ch. wu-shin, Jap. mushin), which asserts, in effect, the nonduality of subject and object." Loy cites D. T. Suzuki: "The seeing is not reflecting on an object as if the seer had nothing to do with it. The seeing, on the contrary, brings the seer and the object seen together, not in mere identification but the becoming conscious of itself, or rather its working.") Gibson also states that "the apparent disappearance of a separate, individual self" is an important aspect of nonduality.

Loy, writing in the early 1980s, takes a perennialist stance, suggesting that the nondifference of subject and object stem from a shared experience of reality. Since the late 1970s this common core thesis has been challenged, notably by Steven T. Katz, arguing that religious experiences is shaped by the frameworks being used, and takes different forms in different traditions. The perennial position is "largely dismissed by scholars" but "has lost none of its popularity."

==== Fabian Volker ====
Fabian Volker criticises Loy's analysis as being explicitly anti-transcendent and limiting the immanent aspect, stating that Loy "fails to provide a systematic typology of nonduality and nondual experiences," and that "his program does not hold up in terms of the historicity of religion or the phenomenology of religion." Volker further notes that adequate typologies of nonduality are lacking because of a lack of interest of "students of nonduality" in the "extensive research on mysticism." According to Volker, the two are not distinct fields of research, but are "two complementary and inextricably interwoven approaches to the same complex field."

Referring to Murti's distinction between advaita (ontology) and advaya (phenomenology), and Richard H. Jones' typology presented in Philosophy of Mysticism (2016). Fabian Volker distinguishes three types of nonduality:

- Asymmetric-vertical nonduality, which postulates a transcendent but immanent reality, which forms the ground or essence of the manifold phenomenal world. This is experienced in introvertive mysticism. Volker further divides this in three subtypes:
  - Nontheistic-personal experiences of this transcendental-immanent reality (Advaita Vedanta)
  - Theistic-personal experiences of this transcendental-immanent reality (Ramanuja)
  - Death-like trance
- Symmetric-horizontal nonduality, or mystical mindfulness, which rejects the existence of an unchanging ultimate reality, but negates the distinction between observer and observed. This is akin to extroverted mystical experience
- Existential nonduality: post-awakening experience of the phenomenal world

For Volker, nonduality lies in nisprapanca/aprapanca ('nonceptualization', "(that which is) beyond discursive thinking") the annihilation of prapanca (conceptualisation, creating multiplicity by multiplying concepts and subsequent creation of attachment) through insight or meditation:

For Nagarjuna, liberation consists in the coming to rest (upasama) of all subjective perception and sensation (sarva-upalambha) as well as everything objectively perceivable, that is, of prapanca. Sankara, too, speaks of the "complete dissolution" and "melting down" of prapanca (prapanca-pravilaya). Thus, nonduality first refers to ultimate reality (paramatha-tattva/nirguma brahman), which lies beyond concept and percept (nama-rupa) and which remains when prapanca has been eliminated by insight (tattvadarsana/brahmajna) or by meditative or contemplative practices (nisprapanca/aprapanca).

==== Other views ====
Regarding the nonplurality of the world, Kazuaki Tanahashi suggests that "what is commonly called nonduality actually means nonplurality and should instead be called "singularity.""

Nondualism had also popularly been defined as interconnectedness and interdepence, and also seems to be synonymous with holism or 'wholism' in modern spirituality, akin to Loy's immanent "nonpluarility of the world," the idea that "the world itself is nonplural, because all the things "in" the world are not really distinct from each other." Hartelius notes that "interconnectedness is not the nondual teaching of Advaita Vedanta, and the precise definition of nonduality within this tradition deserves to be maintained distinct from the very different notion and experience of interconnectedness."

Philip Renard notes that nondual awareness is rooted in direct experience or intuition of "the Real", and argues that nondualism differs from monism. Unlike monism, which may conceptualize reality as a unified whole, nondualism is understood as fundamentally "nonconceptual" and "not graspable in an idea". Alan Watts is credited with popularizing this distinction between nondualism and monism, particularly in The Supreme Identity (1950) and The Way of Zen (1957). He explained that monism often leads to conceptualizing reality as a single entity, whereas nondualism points beyond conceptual frameworks entirely.

Judith Blackstone defines nonduality as "a fundamental unconstructed dimension of our being or consciousness," as found in Dzogchen, Kashmir Shaivism, and Advaita Vedanta, and differentiates between "conceptual recognition of nondual states" and "an embodied realization of nonduality in which the body is fully recognized as this nondual luminosity." Yet, Glenn Hartelius criticises her definition, stating that "it is clearly not a state that is nondual in a way that is congruent with the teachings of lineage-based Advaita Vedanta."

"Nondualism" is also used as a synonym for neo-Advaita or satsang-movement.

=== Nondual awareness ===
"Nondual awareness," also called "consciousness-as-such," "pure consciousness," "pure awareness," "open awareness," "contentless consciousness," "Pure Consciousness Event," (Note: Gibbons 2019: "The descriptions of Brahman that Samkara quotes with approval from the Upanishads, as well as his own words on the subject, seem to point in a direction that is similar to a PCE.") and "Minimal Phenomenal Experience," refers to a state of consciousness described in contemplative traditions as a background field of unified, immutable awareness that exists prior to conceptual thought. According to Michael Taft, as quoted by Chris Grosso, "[n]ondual awareness is an experience. Nondualism is a philosophy that talks about that experience and its meaning."

=== Nondual terms and traditions ===
Different theories and concepts which can be linked to nonduality and nondual awareness are taught in a wide variety of religious traditions, including some western religions and philosophies. While their metaphysical systems differ, they may refer to a similar fundamental awareness. These include:

- (Proto-)samkhya, yoga and sramana-movemënt:

- Ancient speculations on Vedic hymns, according to Larson, gave rise to both the monistic (non-dual) and the Samkhya (dual) tradition, which possibly developed within ascetic milieus. These proto-Samkhya and non-Samkhya speculations are evidenced in the earliest Upanishads and form the basis of Vedanta. Terms: moksha
- Samkhya philosophy and Yoga: Purusha, the eternal witness-consciousness that observes the fluctuations of Prakriti (mind and the material world); kaivalya.

- Buddhism:

- Pre-sectarian Buddhism: luminous mind, vimukti, nirvana
- Early Buddhist schools and Mahayana Buddhism: tathātā, svasaṃvedana
- Mahayana Buddhism:

- Mādhyamaka holds that there is a non-dual (advaya) relationship (that is, there is no true separation) between conventional truth and ultimate truth, as well as between samsara and nirvana. Terms: Śūnyatā.
- Yogācāra, holds that there is no ultimate perceptual and conceptual division between a subject and its objects, or a cognizer and that which is cognized. It also argues against mind-body dualism, holding that there is only representation. Terms: amalavijñāna, pariniṣpanna;
- Tathagatagarbha-thought, which holds that all beings have the inborn potential to become Buddhas. Terms: Buddha-nature, hongaku ("original enlightenment").
- Vajrayana-buddhism, including Tibetan Buddhist traditions of Dzogchen and Mahamudra. Terms: prabhāsa ("clear light"), ground, rigpa.
- East Asian Mahāyāna Buddhist traditions like Pure Land and Zen. Terms: ordinary mind, no-mind;

- Hindu and Buddhist Tantra, Nath: sahaja,
- Hinduism:

- Advaita Vedanta; which teaches that the Atman is pure consciousness, and that a single pure consciousness, svayam prakāśa, is the only reality, and that the world is unreal (Maya). Terms: Atman-Brahman, turiya, Chaitanya, and self-luminous (svayam prakāśa) awareness or Witness-consciousness.
- Non-dual forms of Hindu Tantra including Kashmira Shaivism and the goddess centered Shaktism. Their view is comparable to Advaita, but they teach that the world is not unreal, but it is the real manifestation of consciousness. Terms: samvit, hridyam, aham, prakāśa, vimarśa

- Taoism, which teaches the idea of a single subtle universal force or cosmic creative power called Tao (literally "way").
- Possibly comparable Western traditions:
  - Greek philosophy:
    - Pyrrhonism; see Christopher I. Beckwith
    - Neoplatonism (Plotinus)
  - Hermeticism
- Abrahamic traditions:
  - Sufism
  - Jewish Kabbalah
  - Christian mystics who promote a "nondual experience", such as Meister Eckhart and Julian of Norwich. The focus of this Christian nondualism is on bringing the worshiper closer to God and realizing a "oneness" with the Divine.

=== Scientific perspectives ===
Recent neuroscientific and phenomenological studies have examined nondual awareness as a distinct cognitive and experiential state. Josipovic describes it as a non-representational mode of consciousness, distinct from other mental states. Gamma & Metzinger (2021) propose that nondual awareness can be mapped phenomenologically, identifying factors such as luminosity, absence of egoic boundaries, and self-reflexivity.

However, scholars such as Robert Sharf argue that scientific studies risk reifying nonduality as a purely neurocognitive phenomenon, stripping it of its cultural and soteriological contexts.

== Origins ==
"Truth is One, but the wise call it by many names."

— Rig Veda 1.164.46

According to Dasgupta and Mohanta, non-dualism developed in various strands of Indian thought, both Vedic and Buddhist, from the Upanishadic period onward.

=== Oldest traces ===
According to Cohen, the earliest traces are found in several hymns of the Vedas, such as the Nasadīya ("Non-Being") hymn of the Ṛgveda (Note: Cohen, Signe (27 September 2017). The Upanisads: A Complete Guide. Routledge. p. 467. ISBN 978-1-317-63696-0.: "The idea that the highest truth lies beyond all dualistic constructions of reality has ancient roots in Indian thought. One of the oldest articulations of this idea can be found in the famous Nasadīya ("Non-Being") hymn of the Ṛgveda: "There was neither being nor non-being then." While the Vedic poem describes an undifferentiated reality in the beginning of the world, several Upaniṣads, including the Īśā, hint at a similar sort of undifferentiated oneness as the ultimate goal of the human spiritual quest.)

According to Gombrich, the oldest traces of nondualism in Indian thought may be found in the Chandogya Upanishad (8th to 6th century BCE), which pre-dates the earliest Buddhism. Pre-sectarian Buddhism may also have been responding to the teachings of the Chandogya Upanishad, rejecting some of its Atman-Brahman related metaphysics. However, Schayer and Lindtner notes that even the Nikayas (300 BCE) (Note: The Pāli Canon, as we have it today, reflects a long process of transmission and redaction, including significant editorial activity by the 5th or 6th century CE, nearly a thousand years after the Buddha's death.) preserve elements of an archaic form of Buddhism that is close to Brahmanical beliefs,and which later developed in the Mahayana tradition. Lindtner argues that in precanonical Buddhism, nirvana is considered an actual existent. (Note: Lindtner: "... a place one can actually go to. It is called nirvanadhatu, has no border-signs (animitta), is localized somewhere beyond the other six dhatus (beginning with earth and ending with vijñana) but is closest to akasa and vijñana. One cannot visualize it, it is anidarsana, but it provides one with firm ground under one's feet, it is dhruva; once there one will not slip back, it is acyutapada. As opposed to this world, it is a pleasant place to be in, it is sukha, things work well. Cited in Wynne (2007, p. 99).)

One of the earliest uses of the word Advaita is found in verse 4.3.32 of the Brihadaranyaka Upanishad (8th–5th century BCE) (Note: The chronology and authorship of the Brihadaranyaka Upanishad, along with Chandogya and Kaushitaki Upanishads, is further complicated because they are compiled anthologies of literature that must have existed as independent texts before they became part of these Upanishads.) (Note: The Brhadaranyaka and the Chandogya are the two earliest Upanisads. We have seen, however, that they are edited texts, some of whose sources are much older than others.The two texts as we have them are, in all likelihood, pre-Buddhist.), and in verses 7 and 12 of the Mandukya Upanishad (variously dated to have been composed between 500 BCE to 200 BCE). The term appears in the Brihadaranyaka Upanishad 4.3.32, in the section with a discourse of the oneness of Atman (individual soul) and Brahman (universal consciousness), as follows:

An ocean is that one seer, without any duality [Advaita]; this is the Brahma-world, O King. Thus did Yajnavalkya teach him. This is his highest goal, this is his highest success, this is his highest world, this is his highest bliss. All other creatures live on a small portion of that bliss. (Note: Translation by Max Muller, Brihad Aranyaka Upanishad The Sacred Books of the East, Volume 15, Oxford University Press, p. 171. For other translations, see: * Brihadaranyaka Upanishad Robert Hume (Translator), Oxford University Press, p. 138: "An ocean, a seer alone without duality, becomes he whose world is Brahma, O King!" * Paul Deussen (1997), Sixty Upanishads of the Veda, Volume 1, Motilal Banarsidass, ISBN 978-8120814677, p. 491 Olivelle (2008), Upanisads, p.62: "He becomes the one ocean, he becomes the sole seer!")

=== Proto-samkhya ===
Indian ideas of nondual awareness also developed as proto-Samkhya speculations in ascetic milieus in the 1st millennium BCE, with the notion of Purusha, the witness-conscious or 'pure consciousness'. While samkhya-like speculations can be found in the Rig Veda and some of the older Upanishads, Samkhya may have non-Vedic origins, and developed in ascetic milieus. Proto-samkhya ideas developed from the 8th/7th c. BCE onwards, as evidenced in the middle Upanishads, the Buddhacarita, the Bhagavad Gita, and the Moksadharma-section of the Mahabharata. It was related to the early ascetic traditions and meditation, spiritual practices, and religious cosmology, and methods of reasoning that result in liberating knowledge (vidya, jnana, viveka) that end the cycle of dukkha and rebirth. allowing for "a great variety of philosophical formulations". Brahmanical and non-Brahmanical (Buddhism, Jainism) ascetic traditions of the first millennium BCE developed in close interaction, utilizing proto-Samkhya enumerations (lists) analyzing experience in the context of meditative practices providing liberating insight into the nature of experience. Pre-karika systematic Samkhya existed around the beginning of the first millennium CE. The defining method of Samkhya was established with the Samkhyakarika (4th c. CE).

The Upanishads contain proto-Shamkhya speculations. Yajnavalkya's exposition on the Self in the Brihadaranyaka Upanishad, and the dialogue between Uddalaka Aruni and his son Svetaketu in the Chandogya Upanishad represent a more developed notion of the essence of man (Atman) as "pure subjectivity – i.e., the knower who is himself unknowable, the seer who cannot be seen", and as "pure conscious", discovered by means of speculations, or enumerations. According to Larson, "it seems quite likely that both the monistic trends in Indian thought and the dualistic samkhya could have developed out of these ancient speculations." According to Larson, the enumeration of tattvas in Samkhya is also found in Taittiriya Upanishad, Aitareya Upanishad and Yajnavalkya–Maitri dialogue in the Brihadaranyaka Upanishad.

The Katha Upanishad in verses 3.10–13 and 6.7–11 describes a concept of puruṣa, and other concepts also found in later Samkhya. The Katha Upanishad, dated to be from about the middle of the 1st millennium BCE, in verses 2.6.6 through 2.6.13 recommends a path to Self-knowledge akin to Samkhya, and calls this path Yoga.

Only when Manas (mind) with thoughts and the five senses stand still,
and when Buddhi (intellect, power to reason) does not waver, that they call the highest path.
That is what one calls Yoga, the stillness of the senses, concentration of the mind,
It is not thoughtless heedless sluggishness, Yoga is creation and dissolution.

— Katha Upanishad, 2.6.10–11

=== Development toward monism ===
The first millennium CE saw a movement towards postulating an underlying "basis of unity," both in the Buddhist Madhyamaka and Yogacara schools, and in Advaita Vedanta, collapsing phenomenal reality into a "single substrate or underlying principle." Sengaku Mayeda also states that Indian thought since the Rig Veda tended toward monism, as shown in the development of Mahayana Buddhism in the first centuries CE toward monism, reflecting "the weakening of Buddhism as a social force and the revival of Brahmanism and Hinduism and the consequent brahmanization or "vedantinization" of Buddhism." Several Upanishads, including the Īśā, imply a quest for an undifferentiated oneness as the ultimate objective of human spiritual pursuit. According to the Īśā Upanishad, this goal transcends both the processes of becoming (saṃbhūti) and non-becoming (asaṃbhūti).

== Hinduism ==
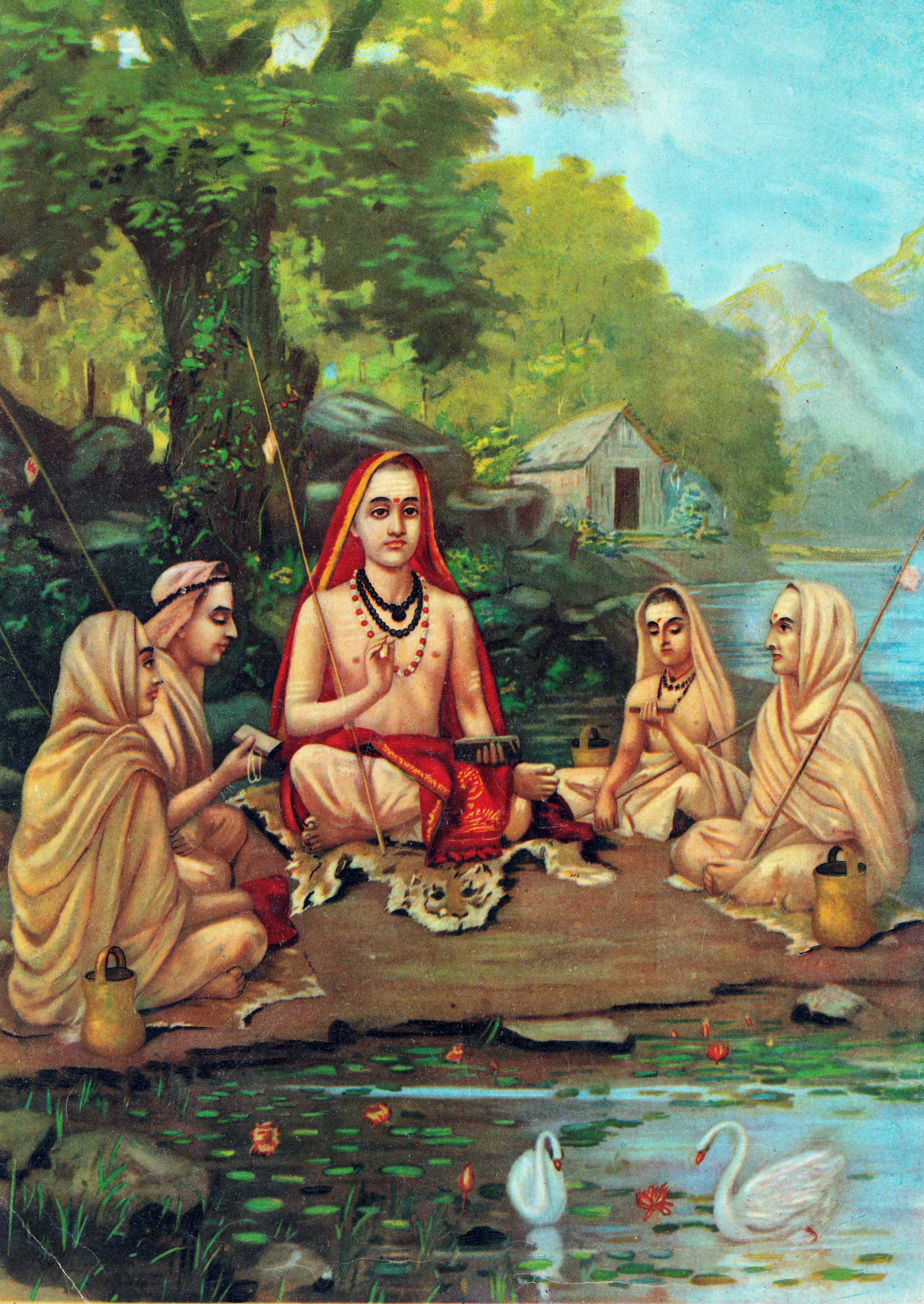
Adi Shankara, the most prominent exponent of Advaita Vedānta tradition. "I am other than name, form and action. My nature is ever free! I am Self, the supreme unconditioned Brahman. I am pure Awareness, always non-dual." Adi Shankara, Upadesasahasri 11.7

Advaita argues that all of the universe is one essential reality, and that all facets and aspects of the universe is ultimately an expression or appearance of that one reality. It regards Atman-Brahman, Shiva or Shakti as the single universal existence beyond the plurality of the world, recognized as pure awareness or the witness-consciousness, as in Vedanta, Shaktism and Shaivism. Although the term is best known from the Advaita Vedanta school of Adi Shankara, advaita appears in different shades in various schools of Hinduism such as in Advaita Vedanta, Vishishtadvaita Vedanta (Vaishnavism), Suddhadvaita Vedanta (Vaishnavism), non-dual Shaivism and Shaktism, as well as modern schools and teachers. The advaita ideas of some Hindu traditions contrasts with the schools that defend dualism or Dvaita, such as that of Madhvacharya who stated that the experienced reality and God are two (dual) and distinct.

=== Vedanta ===
"As people approach Me, so do I receive them. All paths, O Arjuna, are Mine."

— Bhagavad Gītā 4.11

The goal of Vedanta is to know the "truly real" and thus negate false identifications. Several schools of Vedanta are informed by Samkhya, the earliest Indian school of dualism, but teach a form of nondualism. The best-known is Advaita Vedanta, but other nondual Vedanta schools also have a significant influence and following, such as Vishishtadvaita Vedanta and Dvaitadvaita, both of which are bhedabheda. Proto-Vedanta, as reflected in the Brahma Sutras, was majorly bhedabheda, viewing the jivatman and Brahman as both identical and different.

==== Advaita Vedanta ====
Strict nondual/monistic (advaita-'not two'-non-difference) ideas were developed and defended in the nascent Advaita Vedanta tradition, which reacted against Samkhya and Mimansa and moved closer to Mahayana thought, especially that of Nagarjuna, while Shankara reinterpreted these Mahayana influences giving them a Vedantic base and flavor using principal Upanishads, Bhagvad gita, and the Brahma sutras.

In the Advaita Vedanta of Adi Shankara, only Atman-Brahman is ultimately real; the individual jivAtman is ultimately non-different from Atman-Brahman, pure awareness, the witness-consciousness. According to Advaita Vedanta, Brahman is the highest Reality.

The Mahāvākyas, as documented in the Upanishads, explain the unity of Brahman and Atman and form the basis of the Advaita Vedanta tradition.

===== Similarities and differences with Buddhism =====
Scholars state that Advaita Vedanta was influenced by Mahayana Buddhism, given the common terminology and methodology and some common doctrines. Eliot Deutsch and Rohit Dalvi state:

In any event a close relationship between the Mahayana schools and Vedanta did exist, with the latter borrowing some of the dialectical techniques, if not the specific doctrines, of the former. (Note: The influence of Mahayana Buddhism on other religions and philosophies was not limited to Advaita Vedanta. Kalupahana notes that the Visuddhimagga contains "some metaphysical speculations, such as those of the Sarvastivadins, the Sautrantikas, and even the Yogacarins".)

Mahadevan suggests that Gaudapada adopted Buddhist terminology and adapted its doctrines to his Vedantic goals, much like early Buddhism adopted Upanishadic terminology and adapted its doctrines to Buddhist goals; both used pre-existing concepts and ideas to convey new meanings. Michael Comans states there is a fundamental difference between Buddhist thought and that of Gaudapada, who accepts the premises and relies on the fundamental teaching of the Upanishads. Shankara harmonised Gaudapada's ideas with the Upanishadic texts. Dasgupta and Mohanta note that Buddhism and Shankara's Advaita Vedanta are not opposing systems, but "different phases of development of the same non-dualistic metaphysics from the Upanishadic period to the time of Sankara".

==== Vishishtadvaita Vedanta ====
Vishishtadvaita Vedanta is another main school of Vedanta and teaches the nonduality of the qualified whole, in which Brahman alone exists, but is characterized by multiplicity. It can be described as "qualified monism", or "qualified non-dualism", or "attributive monism".

According to this school, the world is real, yet underlying all the differences is an all-embracing unity, of which all "things" are an "attribute". Ramanuja, the main proponent of Vishishtadvaita philosophy contends that the Prasthanatrayi ("The three courses") – namely the Upanishads, the Bhagavad Gita, and the Brahma Sutras – are to be interpreted in a way that shows this unity in diversity, for any other way would violate their consistency.

Vedanta Desika defines Vishishtadvaita using the statement: Asesha Chit-Achit Prakaaram Brahmaikameva Tatvam – "Brahman, as qualified by the sentient and insentient modes (or attributes), is the only reality."

==== Neo-Vedanta ====
Neo-Vedanta, also called "neo-Hinduism" is a modern interpretation of Hinduism which developed in response to western colonialism and orientalism, and aims to present Hinduism as a "homogenized ideal of Hinduism" with Advaita Vedanta as its central doctrine.

Its development was influenced by Unitarian Universalism and western esoteric traditions, especially Transcendentalism, New Thought and Theosophy.

Neo-Vedanta, as represented by Vivekananda and Radhakrishnan, is indebted to Advaita vedanta, but also reflects Advaya-philosophy. A main influence on neo-Advaita was Ramakrishna, himself a bhakta and tantrika, and the guru of Vivekananda. According to Michael Taft, Ramakrishna reconciled the dualism of formlessness and form. Ramakrishna regarded the supreme being to be both personal and impersonal, active and inactive, though he felt that "the distinction between them does not mean a difference", as they "are the same thing, like milk and its whiteness".

Radhakrishnan acknowledged the reality and diversity of the world of experience, which he saw as grounded in and supported by the absolute or Brahman. (Note: Neo-Vedanta seems to be closer to Bhedabheda-Vedanta than to Shankara's Advaita Vedanta, with the acknowledgement of the reality of the world. Nicholas F. Gier: "Ramakrsna, Svami Vivekananda, and Aurobindo (I also include M.K. Gandhi) have been labeled "neo-Vedantists", a philosophy that rejects the Advaitins' claim that the world is illusory. Aurobindo, in his The Life Divine, declares that he has moved from Sankara's "universal illusionism" to his own "universal realism" (2005: 432), defined as metaphysical realism in the European philosophical sense of the term.") According to Anil Sooklal, Vivekananda's neo-Advaita "reconciles Dvaita or dualism and Advaita or non-dualism":

The Neo-Vedanta is also Advaitic inasmuch as it holds that Brahman, the Ultimate Reality, is one without a second, ekamevadvitiyam. But as distinguished from the traditional Advaita of Sankara, it is a synthetic Vedanta which reconciles Dvaita or dualism and Advaita or non-dualism and also other theories of reality. In this sense it may also be called concrete monism in so far as it holds that Brahman is both qualified, saguna, and qualityless, nirguna.

According to Michael Hawley, Radhakrishnan also reinterpreted Shankara's notion of maya. According to Radhakrishnan, maya is not a strict absolute idealism, but "a subjective misperception of the world as ultimately real". It should be noted, though, that Shankara took a realistic stance, and his explanations are "remote from any connotation of illusion." It was the 13th century scholar Prakasatman, founder of the influential Vivarana school, who introduced the notion that the world is illusory. According to Hacker, maya is not a prominent theme for Shankara, in contrast to the later Advaita tradition, and "the word maya has for [Shankara] hardly any terminological weight."

According to Sarma, standing in the tradition of Nisargadatta Maharaj, Advaitavāda means "spiritual non-dualism or absolutism", in which opposites are manifestations of the Absolute, which itself is immanent and transcendent:

All opposites like being and non-being, life and death, good and evil, light and darkness, gods and men, soul and nature are viewed as manifestations of the Absolute which is immanent in the universe and yet transcends it.

Neo-Vedanta was well-received among Theosophists, Christian Science, and the New Thought movement; Christian Science in turn influenced the self-study teaching A Course in Miracles.

=== Kashmir Shaivism ===
Advaita is also a central concept in various schools of Shaivism, such as Kashmir Shaivism and Shiva Advaita which is generally known as Veerashaivism.

Kashmir Shaivism is a school of Śaivism, described by Abhinavagupta (Note: Abhinavgupta (between 10th – 11th century AD) who summarized the view points of all previous thinkers and presented the philosophy in a logical way along with his own thoughts in his treatise Tantraloka.) as "paradvaita", meaning "the supreme and absolute non-dualism". It is categorized by various scholars as monistic idealism (absolute idealism, theistic monism, realistic idealism, transcendental physicalism or concrete monism).

Kashmir Saivism is based on a strong monistic interpretation of the Bhairava Tantras and its subcategory the Kaula Tantras, which were tantras written by the Kapalikas. There was additionally a revelation of the Siva Sutras to Vasugupta. Kashmir Saivism claimed to supersede the dualistic Shaiva Siddhanta. Somananda, the first theologian of monistic Saivism, was the teacher of Utpaladeva, who was the grand-teacher of Abhinavagupta, who in turn was the teacher of Ksemaraja.

The philosophy of Kashmir Shaivism can be seen in contrast to Shankara's Advaita. Advaita Vedanta holds that Brahman is inactive (niṣkriya) and the phenomenal world is a false appearance (māyā) of Brahman, like snake seen in semi-darkness is a false appearance of Rope lying there. In Kashmir Shavisim, all things are a manifestation of the Universal Consciousness, Chit or Brahman. Kashmir Shavisim sees the phenomenal world (Śakti) as real: it exists, and has its being in Consciousness (Chit).

Kashmir Shaivism was influenced by, and took over doctrines from, several orthodox and heterodox Indian religious and philosophical traditions. These include Vedanta, Samkhya, Patanjali Yoga and Nyayas, and various Buddhist schools, including Yogacara and Madhyamika, but also Tantra and the Nath-tradition.

=== Contemporary Indian traditions ===
Primal awareness is also part of other Indian traditions, which are less strongly, or not all, organised in monastic and institutional organisations. Although often called "Advaita Vedanta", these traditions have their origins in vernacular movements and "householder" traditions, and have close ties to the Nath, Nayanars and Sant Mat traditions.

==== Natha Sampradaya ====
The Natha Sampradaya, with Nath yogis such as Gorakhnath, introduced Sahaja, the concept of a spontaneous spirituality. According to Ken Wilber, this state reflects nonduality.

==== Neo-Advaita ====
Neo-Advaita is a new religious movement based on a modern Western interpretation of Advaita Vedanta, especially the teachings of Ramana Maharshi. It is a form of nondualism which emphasizes direct insight, and grew strongly in popularity since the 2000s. According to Arthur Versluis, neo-Advaita is part of a larger religious current which he calls immediatism. Neo-Advaita has been criticized for this immediatism and lack of philosophical groundedness, and its lack of preparatory practices. (Note: Criticism of neo-advaita: * Marek 2008, p. 10, note 6: "Wobei der Begriff Neo-Advaita darauf hinweist, dass sich die traditionelle Advaita von dieser Strömung zunehmend distanziert, da sie die Bedeutung der übenden Vorbereitung nach wie vor als unumgänglich ansieht. (The term Neo-Advaita indicating that the traditional Advaita increasingly distances itself from this movement, as they regard preparational practicing still as inevitable) * Jacobs 2004, p. 82: "Many firm devotees of Sri Ramana Maharshi now rightly term this western phenomenon as 'Neo-Advaita'. The term is carefully selected because 'neo' means 'a new or revived form'. And this new form is not the Classical Advaita which we understand to have been taught by both of the Great Self Realised Sages, Adi Shankara and Ramana Maharshi. It can even be termed 'pseudo' because, by presenting the teaching in a highly attenuated form, it might be described as purporting to be Advaita, but not in effect actually being so, in the fullest sense of the word. In this watering down of the essential truths in a palatable style made acceptable and attractive to the contemporary western mind, their teaching is misleading.") Notable neo-advaita teachers are H. W. L. Poonja and his students Gangaji, Andrew Cohen, (Note: Presently Cohen has distanced himself from Poonja, and calls his teachings "Evolutionary Enlightenment".) and Eckhart Tolle.

== Buddhism ==
"All Buddhist paths, whether presented as Hīnayāna or Mahāyāna, are in truth skillful means leading to the one Buddha-vehicle, the single path culminating in perfect enlightenment."

— Lotus Sutra

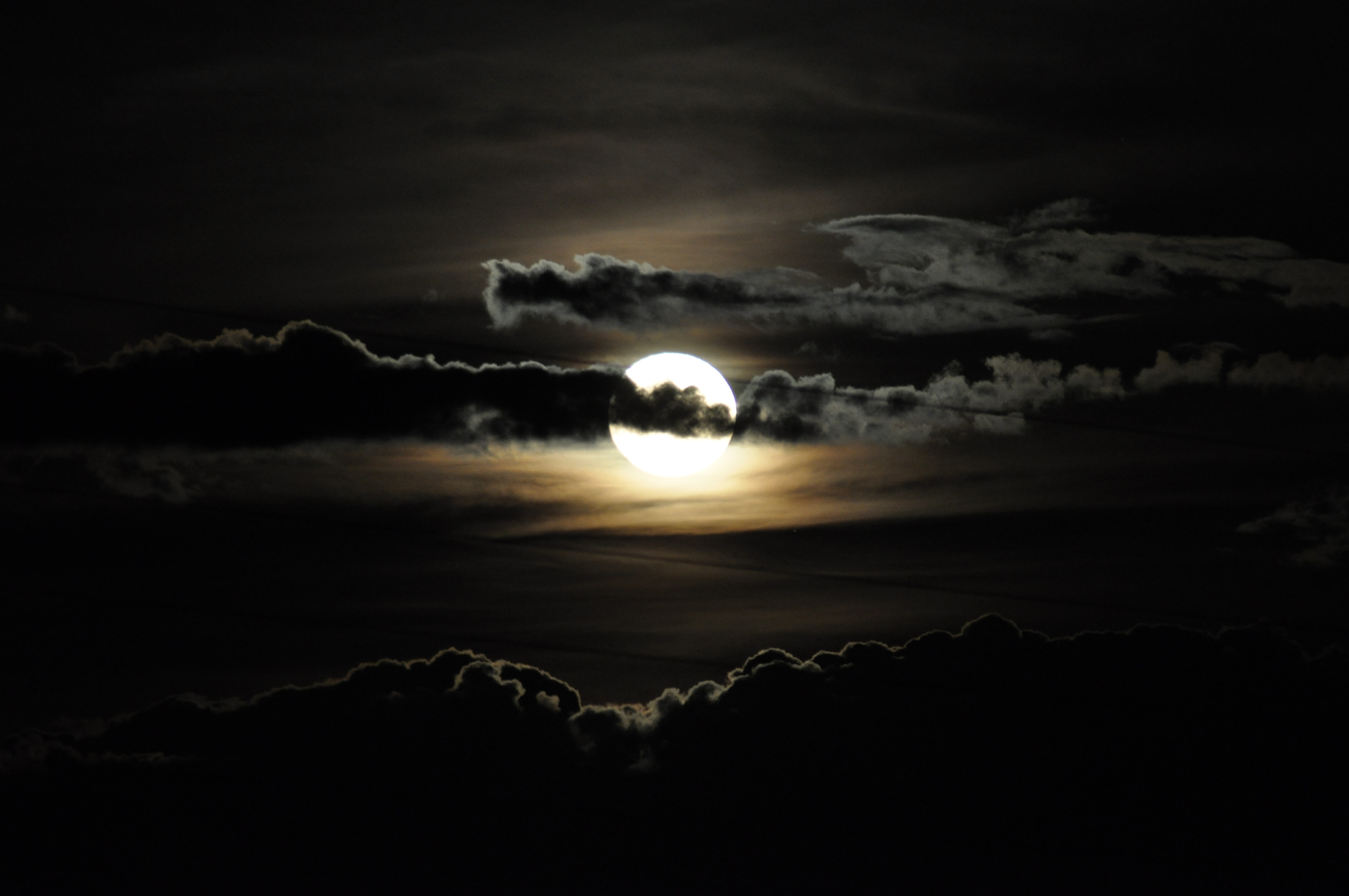
The moon and its light hidden by the clouds is a metaphor for the luminous mind of Buddha-nature, which is always shining but can be hidden or covered over by the afflictions. (Note: The image of the moon as the Buddha-nature can be seen in the Platform Sutra. Dogen treats this metaphor in Shobogenzo 43, Tsuki ("On the Moon as One's Excellent Nature"). Compare also: A Zen master, Ryokan, lived a life of simplicity in his hut near the mountains. When he was away one night, a thief broke in only to find nothing worth stealing. Just then, Ryokan returned. "You have travelled far to visit me," he told the burglar. "I cannot let you return empty handed. Here are my clothes, please accept them as my gift." The baffled thief took the clothes and vanished. Naked now, the master gazed at the moon. "Poor man," he sighed, "How I wish I could give him this glorious moon." (Zen Story: Steal the Moon); "Clear mind is like the full moon in the sky. Sometimes clouds come and cover it, but the moon is always behind them. Clouds go away, then the moon shines brightly. So don't worry about clear mind: it is always there. When thinking comes, behind it is clear mind. When thinking goes, there is only clear mind. Thinking comes and goes, comes and goes. You must not be attached to the coming or the going." (Seung Sahn, Clear Mind Is Like The Full Moon); According to McRae (2003, pp. 61–65), in the famous story of the verse-contest in the Platform Sutra, the two verses are actually complementary: The body is the bodhi tree. The mind is like a bright mirror's stand. At all times we must strive to polish it and must not let dust collect. Bodhi originally has no tree. The mirror has no stand. The Buddha-nature is always clear and pure. Where is there room for dust? According to McRae, "T]he verse attributed to Shenxiu [does refer] to a constant practice of cleaning the mirror [...] Huineng's verse(s) apply the rhetoric of emptiness to undercut the substantiality of the terms of that formulation. However, the basic meaning of the first proposition still remains." See also Joko Beck, Everyday Zen (2008), p.19-20 and p.63 on the mirror verses: Now while the verse of the Sixth Patriarch is the true understanding, the paradox for us is that we have to practice with the verse that was not accepted: we do have to polish the mirror; we do have to be aware of our thoughts and actions; we do have to be aware of our false reactions to life.")

There are different Buddhist views which resonate with the concepts and experiences of primordial awareness and non-duality or "not two" (advaya). The Buddha does not use the term advaya in the earliest Buddhist texts, but it does appear in some of the Mahayana sutras, such as the Vimalakīrti. The Buddha taught meditative inquiry (dhyana) and nondiscursive attention (samadhi).

=== Indian Buddhism ===
==== Nirvana ====
In archaic Buddhism, Nirvana may have been a kind of transformed and transcendent consciousness or discernment (viññana) that has "stopped" (nirodhena). According to Harvey this nirvanic consciousness is said to be "objectless", "infinite" (anantam), "unsupported" (appatiṭṭhita) and "non-manifestive" (anidassana) as well as "beyond time and spatial location".

Stanislaw Schayer, a Polish scholar, argued in the 1930s that the Nikayas preserve elements of an archaic form of Buddhism which is close to Brahmanical beliefs, and survived in the Mahayana tradition. Schayer's view, possibly referring to texts where "'consciousness' (vinnana) seems to be the ultimate reality or substratum" as well as to luminous mind, saw nirvana as an immortal, deathless sphere, a transmundane reality or state. (Note: According to Alexander Wynne, Schayer "referred to passages in which "consciousness" (vinnana) seems to be the ultimate reality or substratum (e.g. A I.10) 14 as well as the Saddhatu Sutra, which is not found in any canonical source but is cited in other Buddhist texts — it states that the personality (pudgala) consists of the six elements (dhatu) of earth, water, fire, wind, space and consciousness; Schayer noted that it related to other ancient Indian ideas. Keith's argument is also based on the Saddhatu Sutra as well as "passages where we have explanations of Nirvana which echo the ideas of the Upanishads regarding the ultimate reality". He also refers to the doctrine of "a consciousness, originally pure, defiled by adventitious impurities".) A similar view is also defended by C. Lindtner, who argues that in precanonical Buddhism nirvana is an actual existent. (Note: Lindtner: "... a place one can actually go to. It is called nirvanadhatu, has no border-signs (animitta), is localized somewhere beyond the other six dhatus (beginning with earth and ending with vijñana) but is closest to akasa and vijñana. One cannot visualize it, it is anidarsana, but it provides one with firm ground under one's feet, it is dhruva; once there one will not slip back, it is acyutapada. As opposed to this world, it is a pleasant place to be in, it is sukha, things work well. Cited in Wynne (2007, p. 99).) The original and early Buddhist concepts of nirvana may have been similar to those found in competing Śramaṇa (strivers/ascetics) traditions such as Jainism and Upanishadic Vedism. Similar ideas were proposed by Edward Conze and M. Falk, citing sources which speak of an eternal and "invisible infinite consciousness, which shines everywhere" as point to the view that nirvana is a kind of Absolute, and arguing that the nirvanic element, as an "essence" or pure consciousness, is immanent within samsara, an "abode" or "place" of prajña, which is gained by the enlightened. (Note: See Digha Nikaya 15, Mahanidana Sutta, which describes a nine-fold chain of causation. Mind-and-body (nama-rupa) and consciousness (vijnana) do condition here each other (verse 2 & 3). In verse 21 and 22, it is stated that consciousness comes into the mother's womb, and finds a resting place in mind-and-body.)

In the Theravada tradition, nibbāna is regarded as an uncompounded or unconditioned (asankhata) dhamma (phenomenon, event) which is "transmundane", (Note: According to Peter Harvey, the Theravada-tradition tends to minimize mystical tendencies, but there is also a tendency to stress the complete otherness of nirvana from samsara. The Pāli Canon provides good grounds for this minimalistic approach, bit it also contains material suggestive of a Vijnavada-type interpretation of nirvāṇa, namely as a radical transformation of consciousness.) and which is beyond our normal dualistic conceptions. (Note: Rahula 2007, Kindle Locations 1105–1113: "Nirvāṇa is beyond all terms of duality and relativity. It is therefore beyond our conceptions of good and evil, right and wrong, existence and non-existence. Even the word 'happiness' (sukha) which is used to describe Nirvāṇa has an entirely different sense here. Sāriputta once said: 'O friend, Nirvāṇa is happiness! Nirvāṇa is happiness!' Then Udāyi asked: 'But, friend Sāriputta, what happiness can it be if there is no sensation?' Sāriputta's reply was highly philosophical and beyond ordinary comprehension: "That there is no sensation itself is happiness'.")

==== Luminous mind ====
Another influential concept in Indian Buddhism is the idea of luminous mind which became associated with Buddha-nature. In the Early Buddhist Texts there are various mentions of luminosity or radiance which refer to the development of the mind in meditation. In the Saṅgīti-sutta for example, it relates to the attainment of samadhi, where the perception of light (āloka sañña) leads to a mind endowed with luminescence (sappabhāsa). According to Analayo, the Upakkilesa-sutta and its parallels mention that the presence of defilements "results in a loss of whatever inner light or luminescence (obhāsa) had been experienced during meditation". The Pali Dhātuvibhaṅga-sutta uses the metaphor of refining gold to describe equanimity reached through meditation, which is said to be "pure, bright, soft, workable, and luminous". The Pali Anguttara Nikaya (A.I.8–10) states:

Luminous, monks, is the mind. And it is freed from incoming defilements. The well-instructed disciple of the noble ones discerns that as it actually is present, which is why I tell you that — for the well-instructed disciple of the noble ones — there is development of the mind.

The term is given no direct doctrinal explanation in the Pali discourses, but later Buddhist schools explained it using various concepts developed by them. The Theravada school identifies the "luminous mind" with the bhavanga, a concept first proposed in the Theravāda Abhidhamma. The later schools of the Mahayana identify it with both the Mahayana concepts of bodhicitta and tathagatagarbha. The notion is of central importance in the philosophy and practice of Dzogchen.

==== Buddha-nature ====
Buddha nature or tathagata-garbha (literally "Buddha womb") is that which allows sentient beings to become Buddhas. Various Mahayana texts such as the Tathāgatagarbha sūtras focus on this idea and over time it became a very influential doctrine in Indian Buddhism, as well in East Asian and Tibetan Buddhism. The Buddha nature teachings may be regarded as a form of nondualism. According to Sally B King, all beings are said to be or possess tathagata-garbha, which is nondual Thusness or Dharmakaya. This reality, states King, transcends the "duality of self and not-self", the "duality of form and emptiness" and the "two poles of being and non being".

There various interpretations and views on Buddha-nature and the concept became very influential in India, China and Tibet, where it also became a source of much debate. In later Indian Yogācāra, a new sub-school developed which adopted the doctrine of tathagata-garbha into the Yogācāra system. The influence of this hybrid school can be seen in texts like the Lankavatara Sutra and the Ratnagotravibhaga. This synthesis of Yogācāra tathagata-garbha became very influential in later Buddhist traditions, such as Indian Vajrayana, Chinese Buddhism and Tibetan Buddhism.

==== Advaya ====
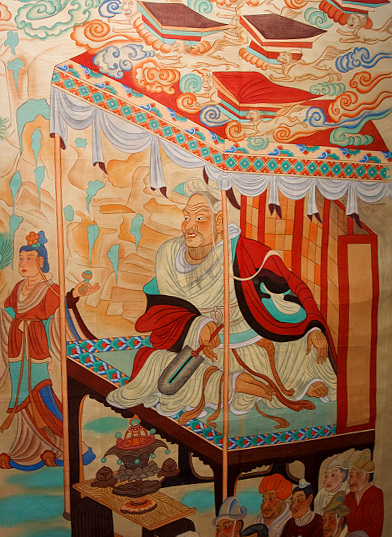
The layman Vimalakīrti debates Manjusri, Dunhuang Mogao Caves

According to Kameshwar Nath Mishra, one connotation of advaya in Sanskrit Buddhist literature is that it refers to the middle way between two opposite extremes (such as eternalism and annihilationism), and thus it is "not two".

One of the Sanskrit Mahayana sutras, the Vimalakirti Sutra contains a chapter on the "Dharma gate of non-duality" (advaya dharma dvara pravesa) which is said to be entered once a person understands how numerous pairs of opposite extremes are to be rejected as forms of grasping. These extremes which must be avoided in order to understand ultimate reality are described by various characters in the text, and include: birth and extinction, 'I' and 'mine', perception and non-perception, defilement and purity, good and not-good, created and uncreated, worldly and unworldly, samsara and nirvana, enlightenment and ignorance, form and emptiness and so on. The final character to attempt to describe ultimate reality is the bodhisattva Manjushri, who states:

It is in all beings wordless, speechless, shows no signs, is not possible of cognizance, and is above all questioning and answering.

Vimalakīrti responds to this statement by maintaining completely silent, therefore expressing that the nature of ultimate reality is ineffable (anabhilāpyatva) and inconceivable (acintyatā), beyond verbal designation (prapañca) or thought constructs (vikalpa). The Laṅkāvatāra Sūtra, a text associated with Yogācāra Buddhism, also uses the term "advaya" extensively.

In the Mahayana Buddhist philosophy of Madhyamaka, the two truths or ways of understanding reality, are said to be advaya (not two). As explained by the Indian philosopher Nagarjuna, there is a non-dual relationship, that is, there is no absolute separation, between conventional and ultimate truth, as well as between samsara and nirvana.

The concept of nonduality is also important in the other major Indian Mahayana tradition, the Yogacara school, where it is seen as the absence of duality between the perceiving subject (or "grasper") and the object (or "grasped"). It is also seen as an explanation of emptiness and as an explanation of the content of the awakened mind which sees through the illusion of subject-object duality. However, in this conception of non-dualism, there are still a multiplicity of individual mind streams (citta santana) and thus Yogacara does not teach an idealistic monism.

These basic ideas have continued to influence Mahayana Buddhist doctrinal interpretations of Buddhist traditions such as Dzogchen, Mahamudra, Zen, Huayan and Tiantai as well as concepts such as Buddha-nature, luminous mind, Indra's net, rigpa and shentong.

==== Madhyamaka ====
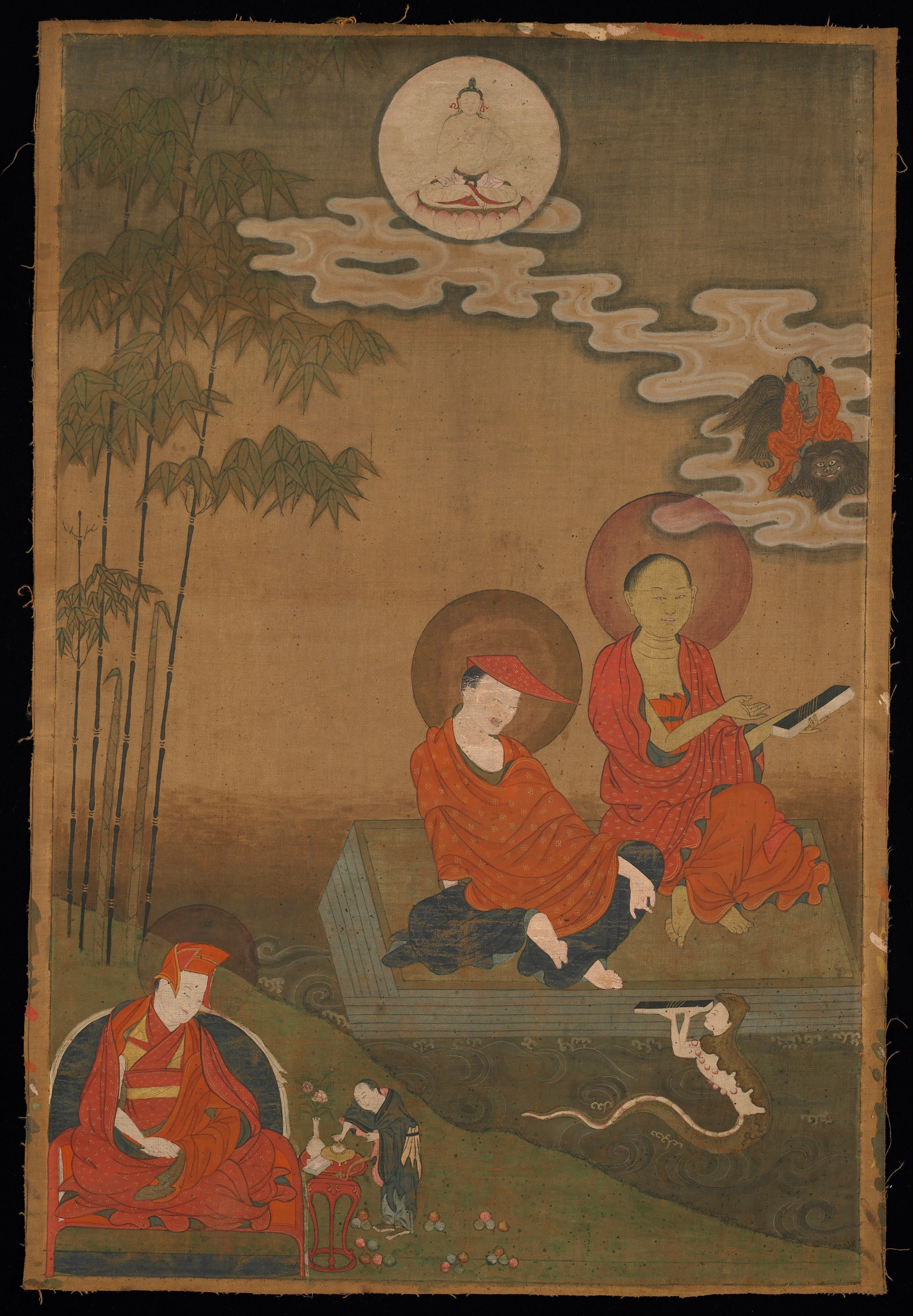
Nagarjuna (right), Aryadeva (middle) and the Tenth Karmapa (left)

Madhyamaka, also known as Śūnyavāda (the emptiness teaching), refers primarily to a Mahāyāna Buddhist school of philosophy founded by Nāgārjuna. In Madhyamaka, Advaya refers to the fact that the two truths are not separate or different., as well as the non-dual relationship of saṃsāra (the round of rebirth and suffering) and nirvāṇa (cessation of suffering, liberation). According to Murti, in Madhyamaka, Advaya is an epistemological theory, unlike the metaphysical view of Hindu Advaita. Madhyamaka advaya is closely related to the classical Buddhist understanding that all things are impermanent (anicca) and devoid of self (anatta) or essenceless (niḥsvabhāva), and that this emptiness does not constitute an absolute reality in itself. (Note: See also essence and function and Absolute-relative on Chinese Chán)

In Madhyamaka, the two truths doctrine refer to conventional (saṃvṛti) and ultimate (paramārtha) truth. The ultimate truth is emptiness, or non-existence of inherently existing things, and the "emptiness of emptiness": emptiness does not in itself constitute an absolute reality. Conventionally, things exist, but ultimately, they are empty of any existence on their own, as described in Nagarjuna's magnum opus, the Mūlamadhyamakakārikā (MMK).

As Jay Garfield notes, for Nagarjuna, to understand the two truths as totally different from each other is to reify and confuse the purpose of this doctrine, since it would either destroy conventional realities such as the Buddha's teachings and the empirical reality of the world (making Madhyamaka a form of nihilism) or deny the dependent origination of phenomena (by positing eternal essences). Thus the non-dual doctrine of the middle way lies beyond these two extremes.

Emptiness is a consequence of pratītyasamutpāda (dependent arising), the teaching that no dharma ("thing", "phenomena") has an existence of its own, but always comes into existence in dependence on other dharmas. According to Madhyamaka all dharma phenomena are empty of substance or essence (Sanskrit: svabhāva) because they are dependently co-arisen. Likewise it is because they are dependently co-arisen that they have no intrinsic, independent reality of their own. Madhyamaka also rejects the existence of absolute realities or beings such as Brahman or Self. In the highest sense, "ultimate reality" is not an ontological Absolute reality that lies beneath an unreal world, nor is it the non-duality of a personal self (atman) and an absolute Self (cf. Purusha). Instead, it is the knowledge which is based on a deconstruction of such reifications and Conceptual proliferations. It also means that there is no "transcendental ground", and that "ultimate reality" has no existence of its own, but is the negation of such a transcendental reality, and the impossibility of any statement on such an ultimately existing transcendental reality: it is no more than a fabrication of the mind. (Note: See, for an influential example, Tsongkhapa, who states that "things" do exist conventionally, but ultimately everything is dependently arisen, and therefore void of inherent existence.) However, according to Nagarjuna, even the very schema of ultimate and conventional, samsara and nirvana, is not a final reality, and he thus famously deconstructs even these teachings as being empty and not different from each other in the MMK where he writes:

The limit (koti) of nirvāṇa is that of saṃsāra
The subtlest difference is not found between the two.

According to Nancy McCagney, what this refers to is that the two truths depend on each other; without emptiness, conventional reality cannot work, and vice versa. It does not mean that samsara and nirvana are the same, or that they are one single thing, as in Advaita Vedanta, but rather that they are both empty, open, without limits, and merely exist for the conventional purpose of teaching the Buddha Dharma.

Yuichi Kajiyama states that the later Madhyamikas developed the Advaya definition as a means to Nirvikalpa-Samadhi by suggesting that "things arise neither from their own selves nor from other things, and that when subject and object are unreal, the mind, being not different, cannot be true either; thereby one must abandon attachment to cognition of nonduality as well, and understand the lack of intrinsic nature of everything". Thus, the Buddhist nondualism or Advaya concept became a means to realizing absolute emptiness.

==== Yogācāra tradition ====
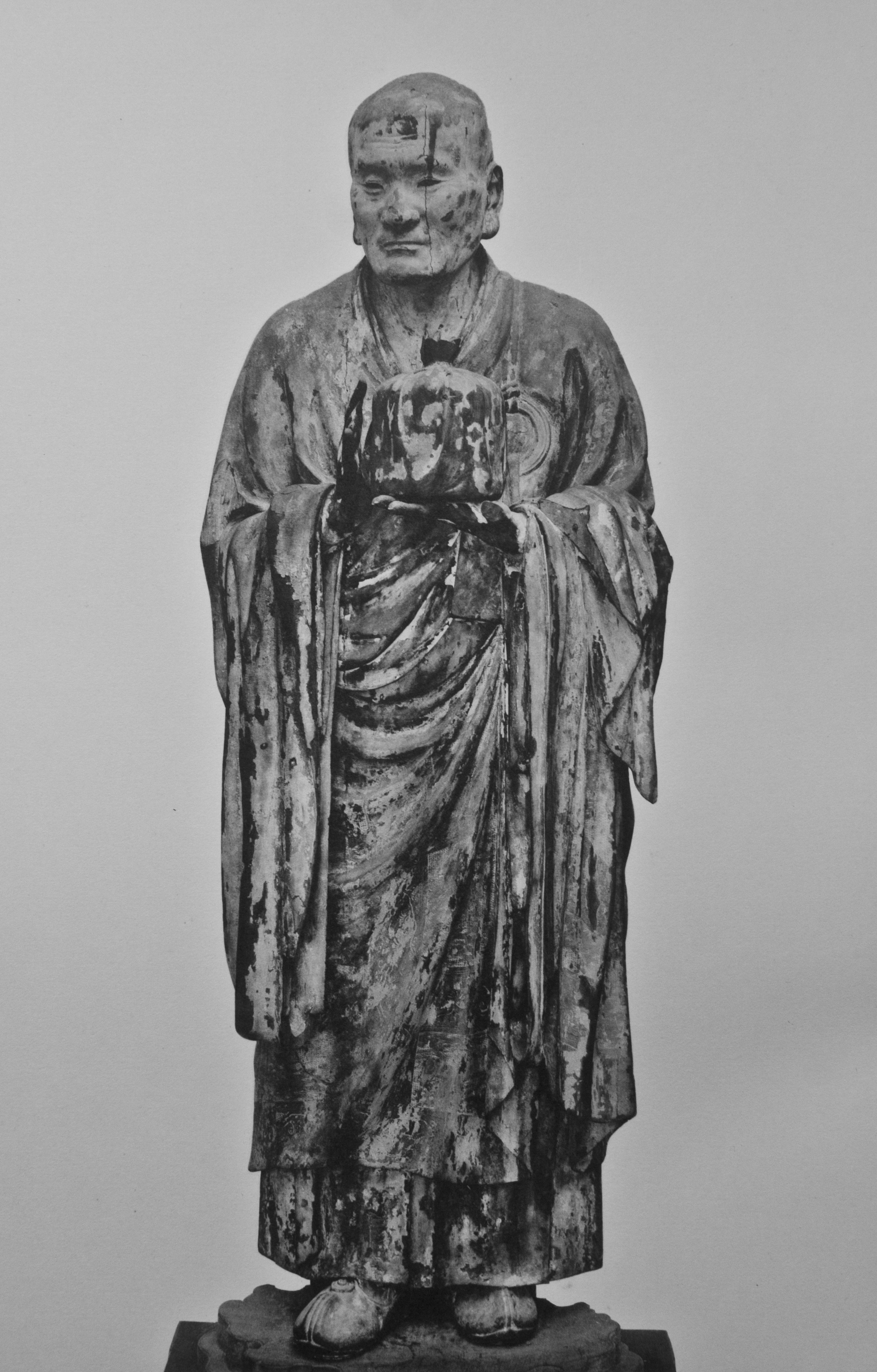
Asaṅga (fl. 4th century C.E.), a Mahayana scholar who wrote numerous works which discuss the Yogacara view and practice

In the Mahayana tradition of Yogācāra (Skt; "yoga practice"), adyava (Tibetan: gnyis med) refers to overcoming the conceptual and perceptual dichotomies of cognizer and cognized, or subject and object. The concept of adyava in Yogācāra is an epistemological stance on the nature of experience and knowledge, as well as a phenomenological exposition of yogic cognitive transformation. Early Buddhism schools such as Sarvastivada and Sautrāntika, that thrived through the early centuries of the common era, postulated a dualism (dvaya) between the mental activity of grasping (grāhaka, "cognition", "subjectivity") and that which is grasped (grāhya, "cognitum", intentional object). Yogacara postulates that this dualistic relationship is a false illusion or superimposition (samaropa).

Yogācāra also taught the doctrine which held that only mental cognitions really exist (vijñapti-mātra), (Note: "Representation-only" or "mere representation". Oxford reference: "Some later forms of Yogācāra lend themselves to an idealistic interpretation of this theory but such a view is absent from the works of the early Yogācārins such as Asaṇga and Vasubandhu.") instead of the mind-body dualism of other Indian Buddhist schools. This is another sense in which reality can be said to be non-dual, because it is "consciousness-only". There are several interpretations of this main theory, which has been widely translated as representation-only, ideation-only, impressions-only and perception-only. Some scholars see it as a kind of subjective or epistemic Idealism (similar to Kant's theory) while others argue that it is closer to a kind of phenomenology or representationalism. According to Mark Siderits the main idea of this doctrine is that we are only ever aware of mental images or impressions which manifest themselves as external objects, but "there is actually no such thing outside the mind." For Alex Wayman, this doctrine means that "the mind has only a report or representation of what the sense organ had sensed." Jay Garfield and Paul Williams both see the doctrine as a kind of Idealism in which only mentality exists.

However, even the idealistic interpretation of Yogācāra is not an absolute monistic idealism like Advaita Vedanta or Hegelianism, since in Yogācāra, even consciousness "enjoys no transcendent status" and is just a conventional reality. Indeed, according to Jonathan Gold, for Yogācāra, the ultimate truth is not consciousness, but an ineffable and inconceivable "thusness" or "thatness" (tathatā). Also, Yogācāra affirms the existence of individual mindstreams, and thus Kochumuttom also calls it a realistic pluralism.

The Yogācārins defined three basic modes by which we perceive our world. These are referred to in Yogācāra as the three natures (trisvabhāva) of experience. They are:

1. Parikalpita (literally, "fully conceptualized"): "imaginary nature", wherein things are incorrectly comprehended based on conceptual and linguistic construction, attachment and the subject object duality. It is thus equivalent to samsara.
2. Paratantra (literally, "other dependent"): "dependent nature", by which the dependently originated nature of things, their causal relatedness or flow of conditionality. It is the basis which gets erroneously conceptualized,
3. Pariniṣpanna (literally, "fully accomplished"): "absolute nature", through which one comprehends things as they are in themselves, that is, empty of subject-object and thus is a type of non-dual cognition. This experience of "thatness" (tathatā) is uninfluenced by any conceptualization at all.

To move from the duality of the Parikalpita to the non-dual consciousness of the Pariniṣpanna, Yogācāra teaches that there must be a transformation of consciousness, which is called the "revolution of the basis" (parāvṛtty-āśraya). According to Dan Lusthaus, this transformation which characterizes awakening is a "radical psycho-cognitive change" and a removal of false "interpretive projections" on reality (such as ideas of a self, external objects, etc.).

The Mahāyānasūtrālamkāra, a Yogācāra text, also associates this transformation with the concept of non-abiding nirvana and the non-duality of samsara and nirvana. Regarding this state of Buddhahood, it states:

Its operation is nondual (advaya vrtti) because of its abiding neither in samsara nor in nirvana (samsaranirvana-apratisthitatvat), through its being both conditioned and unconditioned (samskrta-asamskrtatvena).

This refers to the Yogācāra teaching that even though a Buddha has entered nirvana, they do not “abide" in some quiescent state separate from the world but continue to give rise to extensive activity on behalf of others. This is also called the non-duality between the compounded (samskrta, referring to samsaric existence) and the uncompounded (asamskrta, referring to nirvana). It is also described as a "not turning back" from both samsara and nirvana.

For the later thinker Dignaga, non-dual knowledge or advayajñāna is also a synonym for prajñaparamita (transcendent wisdom) which liberates one from samsara.

==== Tantric Buddhism ====
Buddhist Tantra, also known as Vajrayana, Mantrayana or Esoteric Buddhism, drew upon all these previous Indian Buddhist ideas and nondual philosophies to develop innovative new traditions of Buddhist practice and new religious texts called the Buddhist tantras (from the 6th century onwards). Tantric Buddhism was influential in China and is the main form of Buddhism in the Himalayan regions, especially Tibetan Buddhism.

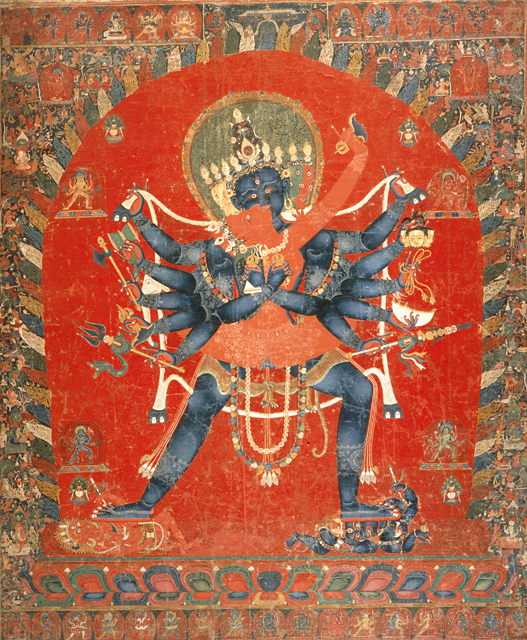
Saṃvara with Vajravārāhī in Yab-Yum. These tantric Buddhist depictions of sexual union symbolize the non-dual union of compassion and emptiness.

The concept of advaya has various meanings in Buddhist Tantra. According to Tantric commentator Lilavajra, Buddhist Tantra's "utmost secret and aim" is Buddha nature. This is seen as a "non-dual, self-originated Wisdom (jnana), an effortless fount of good qualities". In Buddhist Tantra, there is no strict separation between the sacred (nirvana) and the profane (samsara), and all beings are seen as containing an immanent seed of awakening or Buddhahood. The Buddhist Tantras also teach that there is a non-dual relationship between emptiness and compassion (karuna), this unity is called bodhicitta. They also teach a "nondual pristine wisdom of bliss and emptiness". Advaya is also said to be the co-existence of Prajña (wisdom) and Upaya (skill in means). These nondualities are also related to the idea of yuganaddha, or "union" in the Tantras. This is said to be the "indivisible merging of innate great bliss (the means) and clear light (emptiness)" as well as the merging of relative and ultimate truths and the knower and the known, during Tantric practice.

Buddhist Tantras also promote certain practices which are antinomian, such as sexual rites or the consumption of disgusting or repulsive substances (the "five ambrosias", feces, urine, blood, semen, and marrow.). These are said to allow one to cultivate nondual perception of the pure and impure (and similar conceptual dualities) and thus it allows one to prove one's attainment of nondual gnosis (advaya jñana).

Indian Buddhist Tantra also views humans as a microcosmos which mirrors the macrocosmos. Its aim is to gain access to the awakened energy or consciousness of Buddhahood, which is nondual, through various practices.

=== East-Asian Buddhism ===
==== Chinese ====
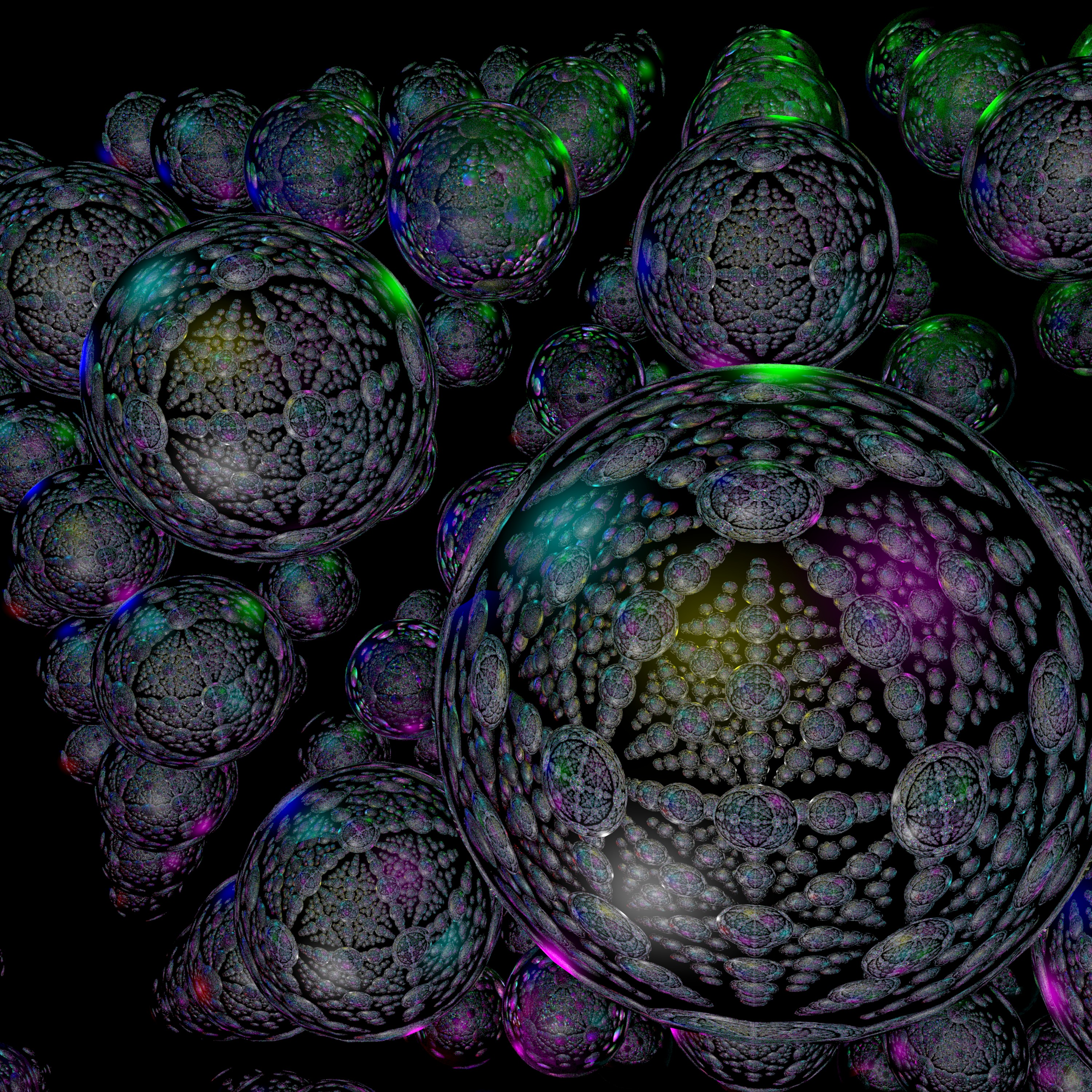
A 3D rendering of Indra's net, an illustration of the Huayan concept of interpenetration

Chinese Buddhism was influenced by the philosophical strains of Indian Buddhist nondualism such as the Madhymaka doctrines of emptiness and the two truths as well as Yogacara and tathagata-garbha. For example, Chinese Madhyamaka philosophers like Jizang, discussed the nonduality of the two truths. Chinese Yogacara also upheld the Indian Yogacara views on nondualism. One influential text in Chinese Buddhism which synthesizes Tathagata-garbha and Yogacara views is the Awakening of Faith in the Mahayana, which may be a Chinese composition.

In Chinese Buddhism, the polarity of absolute and relative realities is also expressed as "essence-function". This was a result of an ontological interpretation of the two truths as well as influences from native Taoist and Confucian metaphysics. In this theory, the absolute is essence, the relative is function. They can't be seen as separate realities, but interpenetrate each other. This interpretation of the two truths as two ontological realities would go on to influence later forms of East Asian metaphysics.

As Chinese Buddhism continued to develop in new innovative directions, it gave rise to new traditions like Tiantai and Chan (Zen), which also upheld their own unique teachings on non-duality.

The Tiantai school for example, taught a threefold truth, instead of the classic "two truths" of Indian Madhyamaka. Its "third truth" was seen as the nondual union of the two truths which transcends both. Tiantai metaphysics is an immanent holism, which sees every phenomenon, moment or event as conditioned and manifested by the whole of reality. Every instant of experience is a reflection of every other, and hence, suffering and nirvana, good and bad, Buddhahood and evildoing, are all "inherently entailed" within each other. Each moment of consciousness is simply the Absolute itself, infinitely immanent and self reflecting.

Two doctrines of the Huayan school (Flower Garland), which flourished in China during the Tang period, are considered nondual by some scholars. King writes that the Fourfold Dharmadhatu and the doctrine of the mutual containment and interpenetration of all phenomena (dharmas) or "perfect interfusion" (yuanrong, 圓融) are classic nondual doctrines. This can be described as the idea that all phenomena "are representations of the wisdom of Buddha without exception" and that "they exist in a state of mutual dependence, interfusion and balance without any contradiction or conflict." According to this theory, any phenomenon exists only as part of the total nexus of reality, its existence depends on the total network of all other things, which are all equally connected to each other and contained in each other. Another Huayan metaphor used to express this view, called Indra's net, is also considered nondual by some.

==== Zen ====
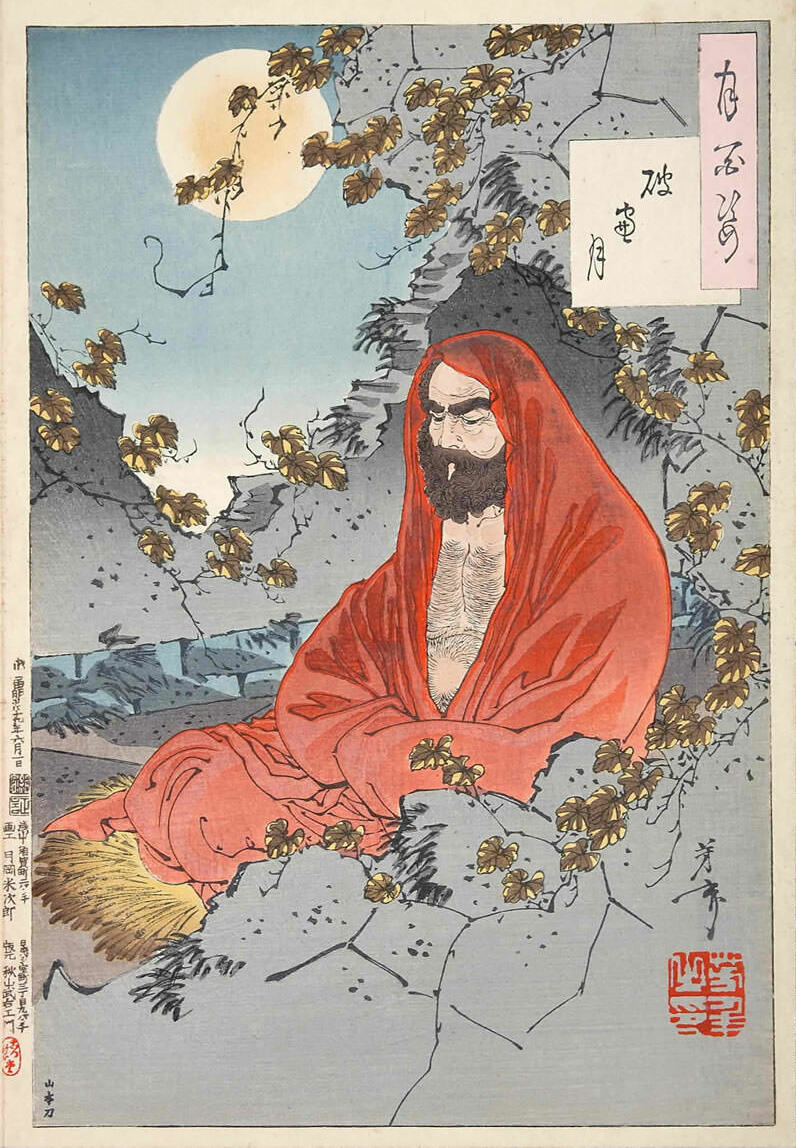
Bodhidharma directly pointing to one's mind: "A special transmission outside the scriptures Not founded upon words and letters; By pointing directly to [one's] mind It lets one see into [one's own true] nature and [thus] attain Buddhahood."

The Buddha-nature and Yogacara philosophies have had a strong influence on Chán and Zen. The teachings of Zen are expressed by a set of polarities: Buddha-nature – sunyata; absolute-relative; sudden and gradual enlightenment.

The Lankavatara-sutra, a popular sutra in Zen, endorses the Buddha-nature and emphasizes purity of mind, which can be attained in gradations. The Diamond-sutra, another popular sutra, emphasizes sunyata, which "must be realized totally or not at all". The Prajnaparamita Sutras emphasize the non-duality of form and emptiness: form is emptiness, emptiness is form, as the Heart Sutra says. According to Chinul, Zen points not to mere emptiness, but to suchness or the dharmadhatu.

The idea that the ultimate reality is present in the daily world of relative reality fitted into the Chinese culture which emphasized the mundane world and society. But this does not explain how the absolute is present in the relative world. This question is answered in such schemata as the Five Ranks of Tozan and the Oxherding Pictures.

The continuous pondering of the break-through kōan (shokan) or Hua Tou, "word head", leads to kensho, an initial insight into "seeing the (Buddha-)nature". According to Victor Sogen Hori, a central theme of many koans is the "identity of opposites", and point to the original nonduality. Hori describes kensho, when attained through koan-study, as the absence of subject–object duality. The aim of the so-called break-through koan is to see the "nonduality of subject and object", in which "subject and object are no longer separate and distinct".

Zen Buddhist training does not end with kenshō. Practice is to be continued to deepen the insight and to express it in daily life, to fully manifest the nonduality of absolute and relative. To deepen the initial insight of kensho, shikantaza and kōan-study are necessary. This trajectory of initial insight followed by a gradual deepening and ripening is expressed by Linji Yixuan in his Three Mysterious Gates, the Four Ways of Knowing of Hakuin, the Five Ranks, and the Ten Ox-Herding Pictures which detail the steps on the Path.

==== Korean ====
The polarity of absolute and relative is also expressed as "essence-function". The absolute is essence; the relative is function. They can't be seen as separate realities, but interpenetrate each other. The distinction does not "exclude any other frameworks such as neng-so or 'subject-object' constructions", though the two "are completely different from each other in terms of their way of thinking". In Korean Buddhism, essence-function is also expressed as "body" and "the body's functions". A metaphor for essence-function is "a lamp and its light", a phrase from the Platform Sutra, where Essence is lamp and Function is light.

==== Pure Land ====
Japanese Pure Land Buddhism holds that enlightenment and earthly life are ultimately nondual; that is, there is no separation between the two. For example, in Jōdo Shinshū, a Japanese branch of Pure Land Buddhism, the writings of the branch's founder, Shinran, hold that ultimate and conventional reality exist together. Nonduality "points beyond all conceptual categories," but the ultimate does not manifest through the disappearance of conventional reality, but by experiencing conventional reality in a different way.

=== Tibetan Buddhism ===
==== Prasangika Madhyamaka ====
The Gelugpa school, following Tsongkhapa, adheres to the adyava Prasaṅgika Mādhyamaka view, which states that all phenomena are sunyata, empty of self-nature, and that this "emptiness" is itself only a qualification, not a concretely existing "absolute" reality.

==== Shentong ====
In Tibetan Buddhism, the essentialist position is represented by shentong, while the nominalist, or non-essentialist position, is represented by rangtong.

Shentong is a philosophical sub-school found in Tibetan Buddhism. Its adherents generally hold that the nature of mind (svasaṃvedana), the substratum of the mindstream, is "empty" (Wylie: stong) of "other" (Wylie: gzhan), i.e., empty of all qualities other than an inherently existing, ineffable nature. Shentong has often been incorrectly associated with the Cittamātra (Yogacara) position, but is in fact also Madhyamaka, and is present primarily as the main philosophical theory of the Jonang school, although it is also taught by the Sakya and Kagyu schools. According to Shentongpa (proponents of shentong), the emptiness of ultimate reality should not be characterized in the same way as the emptiness of apparent phenomena because it is prabhāśvara-saṃtāna, or "luminous mindstream" endowed with limitless Buddha qualities. It is empty of all that is false, not empty of the limitless Buddha qualities that are its innate nature.

The contrasting Prasaṅgika view that all phenomena are sunyata, empty of self-nature, and that this "emptiness" is not a concretely existing "absolute" reality, is labeled rangtong, "empty of self-nature".

The shentong-view is related to the Ratnagotravibhāga sutra and the Yogacara-Madhyamaka synthesis of Śāntarakṣita. The truth of sunyata is acknowledged, but not considered to be the highest truth, which is the empty nature of mind. Insight into sunyata is preparatory for the recognition of the nature of mind.

==== Dzogchen ====
Dzogchen is concerned with the "natural state" and emphasizes direct experience. The state of nondual awareness is called rigpa. This primordial nature is clear light, unproduced and unchanging, free from all defilements. Through meditation, the Dzogchen practitioner experiences that thoughts have no substance. Mental phenomena arise and fall in the mind, but fundamentally they are empty. The practitioner then considers where the mind itself resides. Through careful examination one realizes that the mind is emptiness.

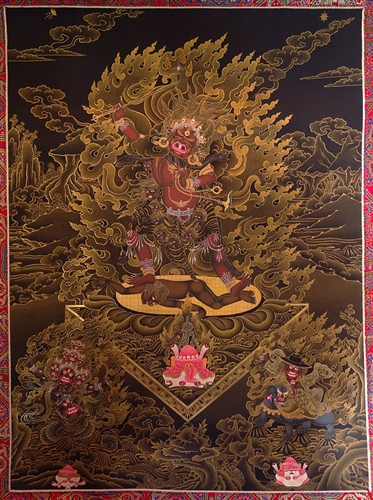
Ekajati is one of the main protectors of the Dzogchen teachings.

Karma Lingpa (1326–1386) revealed "Self-Liberation through seeing with naked awareness" (rigpa ngo-sprod, (Note: Full: rigpa ngo-sprod gcer-mthong rang-grol)) which is attributed to Padmasambhava. (Note: This text is part of a collection of teachings entitled "Profound Dharma of Self-Liberation through the Intention of the Peaceful and Wrathful Ones" (zab-chos zhi khro dgongs pa rang grol, also known as kar-gling zhi-khro), which includes the two texts of bar-do thos-grol, the so-called "Tibetan Book of the Dead". The bar-do thos-grol was translated by Kazi Dawa Samdup (1868–1922), and edited and published by W.Y. Evans-Wenz. This translation became widely known and popular as "the Tibetan Book of the Dead", but contains many mistakes in translation and interpretation.) The text gives an introduction, or pointing-out instruction (ngo-spro), into rigpa, the state of presence and awareness. In this text, Karma Lingpa writes the following regarding the unity of various terms for nonduality:

With respect to its having a name, the various names that are applied to it are inconceivable (in their numbers).
Some call it "the nature of the mind" or "mind itself".
Some Tirthikas call it by the name Atman or "the Self".
The Sravakas call it the doctrine of Anatman or "the absence of a self".
The Chittamatrins call it by the name Chitta or "the Mind".
Some call it the Prajnaparamita or "the Perfection of Wisdom".
Some call it the name Tathagata-garbha or "the embryo of Buddhahood".
Some call it by the name Mahamudra or "the Great Symbol".
Some call it by the name "the Unique Sphere".
Some call it by the name Dharmadhatu or "the dimension of Reality".
Some call it by the name Alaya or "the basis of everything".
And some simply call it by the name "ordinary awareness".

===== Garab Dorje's three statements =====
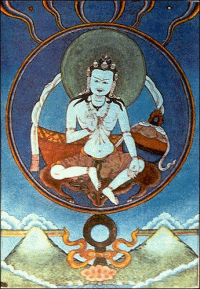
Garab Dorje or Prehebajra, a Dzogchen master

Garab Dorje (c. 665) epitomized the Dzogchen teaching in three principles, known as "Striking the Vital Point in Three Statements" (Tsik Sum Né Dek), said to be his last words. These three statements are believed to convey the heart of his teachings and serve as a concise and profound encapsulation of Dzogchen's view, its practice of contemplation, and the role of conduct. They give in short the development a student has to undergo:

Garab Dorje's three statements were integrated into the Nyingthig traditions, the most popular of which in the Longchen Nyingthig by Jigme Lingpa (1730–1798). The statements are:

1. Introducing directly the face of rigpa itself (ngo rang tok tu tré). Dudjom Rinpoche states this refers to: "Introducing directly the face of the naked mind as the rigpa itself, the innate primordial wisdom."
2. Deciding upon one thing and one thing only (tak chik tok tu ché). Dudjom states: "Because all phenomena, whatever manifests, whether saṃsāra or nirvāṇa, are none other than the rigpa's own play, there is complete and direct decision that there is nothing other than the abiding of the continual flow of rigpa."
3. Confidence directly in the liberation of rising thoughts (deng drol tok tu cha). Dudjom comments: "In the recognition of namtok [arising thoughts], whatever arises, whether gross or subtle, there is direct confidence in the simultaneity of the arising and dissolution in the expanse of dharmakāya, which is the unity of rigpa and śūnyatā."

== Other eastern religions ==
=== Sikhism ===
Many newer, contemporary Sikhs have suggested that human souls and the monotheistic God are two different realities (dualism), distinguishing it from the monistic and various shades of nondualistic philosophies of other Indian religions. However, some Sikh scholars have attempted to explore nondualism exegesis of Sikh scriptures, such as during the neocolonial reformist movement by Bhai Vir Singh. According to Mandair, Singh interprets the Sikh scriptures as teaching nonduality. Sikh scholar Bhai Mani Singh is quoted as saying that Sikhism has all the essence of Vedanta philosophy. Historically, the Sikh symbol of Ik Oankaar has had a monistic meaning, and has been reduced to simply meaning, "There is but One God", which is incorrect. Older exegesis of Sikh scripture, such as the Faridkot Teeka, has always described Sikh metaphysics as a non-dual, panentheistic universe.

=== Taoism ===
Taijitu

According to Paul A. Erickson, the concept of yin and yang, often mistakenly conceived of as a symbol of dualism, is actually meant to convey the notion that all apparent opposites are complementary parts of a non-dual whole.

Taoism's wu wei (Chinese wu, not; wei, doing) is a term with various translations (Note: Inaction, non-action, nothing doing, without ado) and interpretations designed to distinguish it from passivity. Commonly understood as "effortless action", wu wei encourages individuals to flow with the natural rhythms of existence, moving beyond dualistic perspectives and embracing a harmonious unity with the universe. This holistic approach to life, characterized by spontaneous and unforced action, emphasizes interconnectedness and oneness, and integrates effortless action in both physical deeds and mental states.

=== Neo-Confucianism ===
Neo-Confucianism is primarily a social and ethical philosophy that uses metaphysical ideas, some borrowed from Taoism, as its framework. Concepts like li (principle) and qi (energy) reflect certain monistic tendencies. However, unlike the dominant Buddhists of their time, the Neo-Confucians believed that reality existed and could be understood by humankind.

== Western traditions ==
A modern strand of thought sees "nondual consciousness" as a universal psychological state, which is a common stratum and of the same essence in different spiritual traditions. It is derived from Neo-Vedanta and neo-Advaita, but has historical roots in neo-Platonism, Western esotericism, and Perennialism. The idea of nondual consciousness as "the central essence" is a universalistic and perennialist idea, which is part of a modern mutual exchange and synthesis of ideas between western spiritual and esoteric traditions and Asian religious revival and reform movements. (Note: See McMahan, "The making of Buddhist modernity" and Richard E. King, "Orientalism and Religion" for descriptions of this mutual exchange.)

Central elements in the western traditions are Neo-Platonism, which had a strong influence on Christian contemplation or mysticism, and its accompanying apophatic theology.

=== Western philosophy ===
==== Greek philosophy ====
Parmenides of Elea was a pre-Socratic Greek philosopher of the 5th century BCE. He presented two views of reality. The first, the way of Aletheia (truth), describes how all reality is one: change is impossible, and existence is timeless and uniform. The second, the way of Doxa (opinion), refers to the world of appearances, where sensory perception leads to false and deceptive conceptions. Parmenides depicted his philosophy as a divine truth and rejected the evidence of the senses, believing that truth could only be attained through reason. However, he still considered both divine and mortal understandings worth learning, as mortal insights can carry meaning. His concept of eternal Being was one without reference to time; since change cannot occur within Being, there are no intervals by which time can be measured.

A number of similarities have been noted between the Pyrrhonist works of Sextus Empiricius and that of Nagarjuna, the Madhyamaka Buddhist philosopher from the 2nd or 3rd century CE. Diogenes Laërtius' biography of Pyrrho reports that Pyrrho traveled with Alexander the Great's army to India and incorporated what he learned from the Gymnosophists and the Magi that he met in his travels into his philosophical system. Pyrrho would have spent about 18 months in Taxila as part of Alexander the Great's court during Alexander's conquest of the east. Christopher I. Beckwith draws comparisons between the Buddhist three marks of existence and the concepts outlined in the "Aristocles Passage". Ajñana, which upheld radical skepticism, may have been a more powerful influence on Pyrrho than Buddhism. The Buddhists referred to Ajñana's adherents as Amarāvikkhepikas or "eel-wrigglers", due to their refusal to commit to a single doctrine. Scholars including Barua, Jayatilleke, and Flintoff, contend that Pyrrho was influenced by, or at the very least agreed with, Indian skepticism rather than Buddhism or Jainism, based on the fact that he valued ataraxia, which can be translated as "freedom from worry".

The Stoics provided a unified account of the world, constructed from ideals of logic, monistic physics, and naturalistic ethics. These three ideals constitute virtue, which is necessary for 'living a well-reasoned life', seeing as they are all parts of a logos, or philosophical discourse, which includes the mind's rational dialogue with itself.

Neopythagoreanism was an attempt to re-introduce a mystical religious element into Hellenistic philosophy in place of what had come to be regarded as an arid formalism. The founders of the school sought to invest their doctrines with the halo of tradition by ascribing them to Pythagoras and Plato. They went back to the later period of Plato's thought, the period when Plato endeavoured to combine his theory of forms with Pythagorean number theory, and identified the good with the monad (which would give rise to the Neoplatonic concept of "the One"), the source of the duality of the infinite and the measured with the resultant scale of realities from the one down to the objects of the material world.

Neoplatonism also contains nondual elements. Plotinus taught that there is a supreme, totally transcendent "One", containing no division, multiplicity, nor distinction; likewise, it is beyond all categories of being and non-being. The concept of "being" is derived by us from the objects of human experience and is an attribute of such objects, but the infinite, transcendent One is beyond all such objects and, therefore, is beyond the concepts which we can derive from them. The One "cannot be any existing thing" and cannot be merely the sum of all such things (compare the Stoic doctrine of disbelief in non-material existence) but "is prior to all existents".

==== Modern philosophy ====
Western philosophers like Hegel, Spinoza and Schopenhauer defended different forms of philosophical monism or Idealism.

Baruch Spinoza's formulation of pantheism in the 17th century constitutes a seminal European manifestation of nondualism. His philosophical work, especially expounded in Ethics posits a radical idea that fuses divinity with the material world, suggesting that God and the universe are not separate entities but different facets of a single underlying substance. In his worldview, the finite and the infinite are harmoniously interwoven, challenging René Descartes' dualistic perspective.

One of Friedrich Nietzsche's philosophical insights also resonates with nondualism. Nietzsche wrote that "We cease to think when we refuse to do so under the constraint of language." (Note: "Wir hören auf zu denken wenn wir es nicht in dem sprachichen Zwange thun wollen, wir langen gerade noch bei dem Zweifel an, hier eine Granze als Grenze zu sehn." quoted in Liberman (2017).) This idea is explored in his book On Truth and Lies in a Nonmoral Sense. His scrutiny of conventional thought and language urges a departure from linguistic boundaries. This perspective aligns with the nondual notion of transcending dualistic concepts and engaging with reality in a more immediate, intuitive manner.

=== Western esotericism ===
Theosophy is a religious movement founded by Helena Blavatsky, which holds a monist position that there exists a single divine Absolute and articulates an emanationist cosmology in which the universe is perceived as outward reflections from this Absolute. The purpose of human life is spiritual emancipation and the human soul undergoes reincarnation upon bodily death according to a process of karma. Drawing primarily from Advaita Vedanta, some strands of Mahayana Buddhism, and Neoplatonism, Theosophy identifies India as the center of a universal ancient wisdom-religion. Some of its concepts were later distorted and racialized in the development of Ariosophy, a nationalist esoteric ideology, which misappropriated Theosophical ideas and contributed to the ideological background of Nazism.

Ariosophy has been described as gnostic, pantheist, and deist, but at its core is the mystical union of God, man, and nature. It teaches that God dwells within the individual human spirit as an inner source of magical power, but is also immanent within nature through the primal laws that govern the cycles of growth, decay, and renewal. It explicitly rejects a Mind-body dualism of spirit versus matter, or of God over or against nature. Humanity is therefore one with the universe, which entails an obligation to live in accordance with nature.

Other modern theories with non-dual elements include Quantum mysticism, which links spirituality to quantum mechanics and posits that consciousness causes collapse, and Integral theory by Ken Wilber, a metatheory unifying Western models and Eastern meditative traditions.

=== Hermeticism ===
In Hermetic view, God is both the all (Greek: to pan) and the creator of the all: all created things pre-exist in God and God is the nature of the cosmos (being both the substance from which it proceeds and the governing principle which orders it), yet the things themselves and the cosmos were all created by God. Thus, God ('the All') creates itself, and is both transcendent (as the creator of the cosmos) and immanent (as the created cosmos). These ideas are also closely related to the cosmo-theological views of the Stoics.

=== Medieval Abrahamic religions ===
==== Christian contemplation and mysticism ====
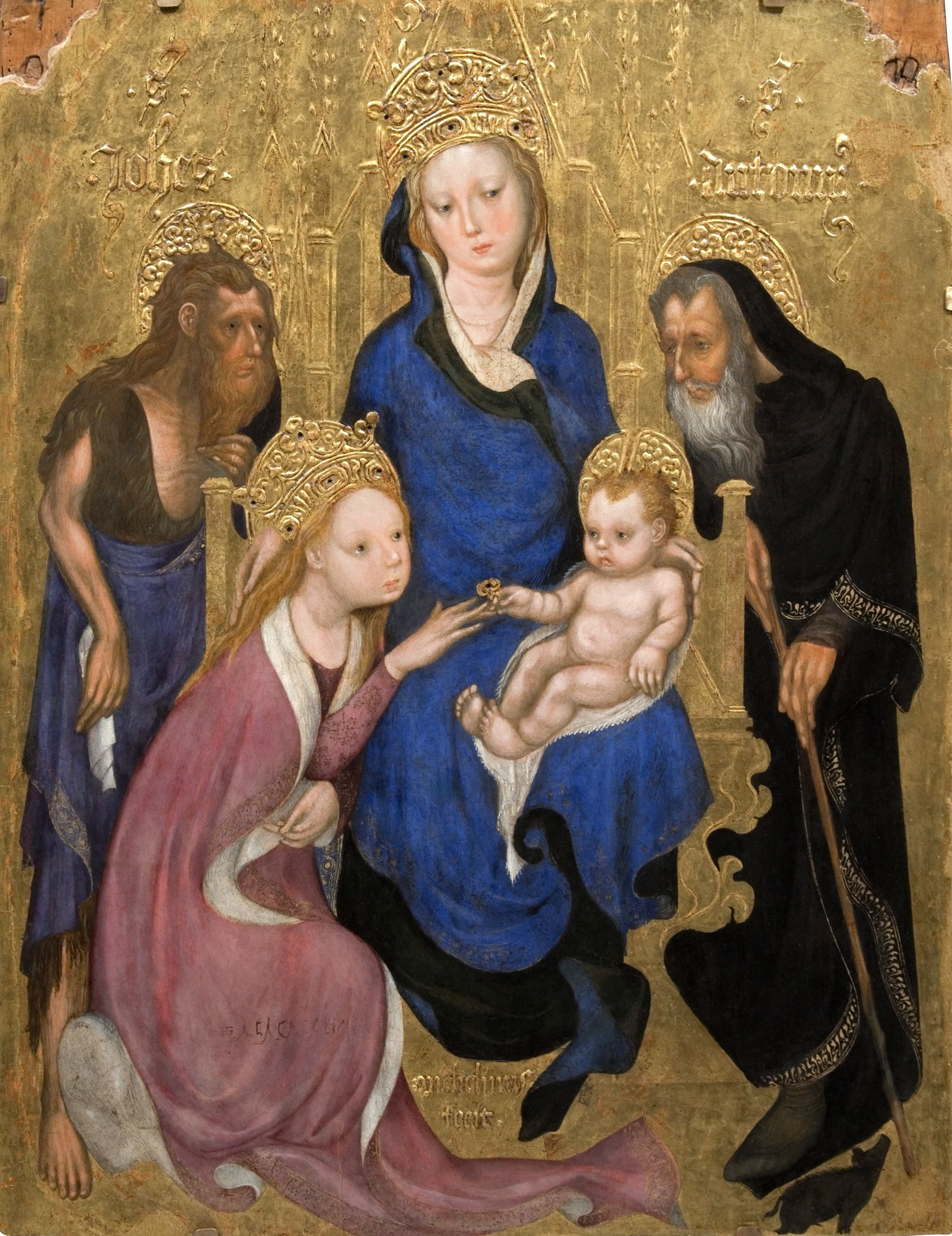
The Mystic Marriage of St Catherine, St John the Baptist, St Antony Abbot

In Christian mysticism, contemplative prayer and apophatic theology are central elements. In contemplative prayer, the mind is focused by constant repetition a phrase or word. Saint John Cassian recommended use of the phrase "O God, make speed to save me: O Lord, make haste to help me". Another formula for repetition is the name of Jesus or the Jesus Prayer, which has been called "the mantra of the Orthodox Church", although the term "Jesus Prayer" is not found in the Fathers of the Church. The author of The Cloud of Unknowing recommended use of a monosyllabic word, such as "God" or "Love".

Apophatic theology is derived from Neo-Platonism via Pseudo-Dionysius the Areopagite. In this approach, the notion of God is stripped from all positive qualifications, leaving a "darkness" or "unground", it had a strong influence on western mysticism. A notable example is Meister Eckhart, who also attracted attention from Zen-Buddhists like D.T. Suzuki in modern times, due to the similarities between Buddhist thought and Neo-Platonism.

The Cloud of Unknowing – an anonymous work of Christian mysticism written in Middle English in the latter half of the 14th century – advocates a mystic relationship with God. The text describes a spiritual union with God through the heart. The author of the text advocates centering prayer, a form of inner silence. According to the text, God can not be known through knowledge or from intellection. It is only by emptying the mind of all created images and thoughts that we can arrive to experience God. Continuing on this line of thought, God is completely unknowable by the mind. God is not known through the intellect but through intense contemplation, motivated by love, and stripped of all thought.

Thomism, though not non-dual in the ordinary sense, considers the unity of God so absolute that even the duality of subject and predicate, to describe him, can be true only by analogy. In Thomist thought, even the Tetragrammaton is only an approximate name, since "I am" involves a predicate whose own essence is its subject.

The former nun and contemplative Bernadette Roberts is considered a nondualist by Jerry Katz.

==== Jewish Hasidism and Kabbalism ====
According to Jay Michaelson, nonduality begins to appear in the medieval Jewish textual tradition which peaked in Hasidism:

Judaism has within it a strong and very ancient mystical tradition that is deeply nondualistic. "Ein Sof" or infinite nothingness is considered the ground face of all that is. God is considered beyond all proposition or preconception. The physical world is seen as emanating from the nothingness as the many faces "partzufim" of god that are all a part of the sacred nothingness.

One of the most striking contributions of the Kabbalah, which became a central idea in Chasidic thought, was a highly innovative reading of the monotheistic idea. The belief in one God is no longer perceived as the mere rejection of other deities or intermediaries, but a denial of any existence outside of God. (Note: As Rabbi Moshe Cordovero explains: "Before anything was emanated, there was only the Infinite One (Ein Sof), which was all that existed. And even after He brought into being everything which exists, there is nothing but Him, and you cannot find anything that existed apart from Him, G-d forbid. For nothing existed devoid of G-d's power, for if there were, He would be limited and subject to duality, G-d forbid. Rather, G-d is everything that exists, but everything that exists is not G-d... Nothing is devoid of His G-dliness: everything is within it... There is nothing but it" (Rabbi Moshe Cordovero, Elimah Rabasi, p. 24d-25a; for sources in early Chasidism see: Rabbi Ya'akov Yosef of Polonne, Ben Poras Yosef (Piotrków 1884), pp. 140, 168; Keser Shem Tov (Brooklyn: Kehos 2004) pp. 237–8; Rabbi Menachem Mendel of Vitebsk, Pri Ha-Aretz, (Kopust 1884), p. 21.). See The Practical Tanya, Part One, The Book for Inbetweeners, Schneur Zalman of Liadi, adapted by Chaim Miller, Gutnick Library of Jewish Classics, p. 232-233)

== Academic views ==
=== Orientalism ===
The western world has been exposed to Indian religions since the late 18th century. The first western translation of a Sanskrit text was made in 1785. It marked a growing interest in Indian culture and languages. The first translation of the dualism and nondualism discussing Upanishads appeared in two parts in 1801 and 1802 and influenced Arthur Schopenhauer, who called them "the consolation of my life". Early translations also appeared in other European languages.

=== Common-core thesis ===
==== Perennialism ====
The common-core thesis suggests that different mystical traditions may describe similar, if not identical, experiences, despite using different conceptual frameworks and terminologies. Proponents of Perennialism, such as Aldous Huxley, argue that a universal mystical core underlies all religious traditions. Huxley, influenced by Vivekananda's Neo-Vedanta and Universalism, promoted this idea in his book The Perennial Philosophy. However, scholarly critiques of this thesis argue that religious experiences are often culturally and doctrinally mediated, rather than pointing to a single, universal experience.

Elias Amidon describes this common essence as an "indescribable but definitely recognizable reality" that serves as the ground of all being. He suggests that various spiritual traditions refer to this reality by different names, including:

[N]ondual awareness, pure awareness, open awareness, presence-awareness, unconditioned mind, rigpa, primordial experience, This, the basic state, the sublime, buddhanature, original nature, spontaneous presence, the oneness of being, the ground of being, the Real, clarity, God-consciousness, divine light, the clear light, illumination, realization and enlightenment.

==== Critiques of the common-core thesis ====
Critics of the common-core thesis, often referred to as diversity theorists, argue that mystical experiences are not universal but instead culturally and doctrinally shaped. Scholars such as S. T. Katz and Wayne Proudfoot assert that all religious experiences are mediated by language, tradition, and conceptual frameworks rather than reflecting an unconditioned, universal mystical reality. Katz, in particular, writes that "[N]o unmediated experience is possible, and that in the extreme, language is not simply used to interpret experience but in fact constitutes experience." This position challenges the idea that nondual awareness is a common mystical essence, arguing instead that what one experiences in religious practice is shaped by their specific cultural and doctrinal background.

Philosopher Keith Yandell further critiques the common-core thesis by distinguishing five distinct categories of religious experiences, each tied to a specific doctrinal framework:

- Numinous experiences – Found in monotheistic traditions such as Judaism, Christianity, and Vedantic Hinduism.
- Nirvanic experiences – Found in Buddhism, where one perceives the self as a bundle of fleeting states rather than a fixed entity.
- Kevala experiences – Found in Jainism, where the self is understood as an indestructible subject of experience.
- Moksha experiences – Found in Hinduism, with Brahman conceptualized either as a cosmic person or as an impersonal, qualityless absolute.
- Nature mystical experiences – Found in traditions emphasizing union with nature rather than a transcendental or metaphysical realization.

This classification suggests that religious experiences vary significantly across traditions, contradicting the claim that all mystical experiences point to the same nondual essence.

Further criticism comes from Richard King and Robert Sharf, who argue that what one experiences in meditation or mystical practice is largely shaped by pre-existing doctrinal expectations. In this view, mystical experiences are not independent proofs of a given tradition's truth but are instead a result of the teachings and practices within that tradition.

For example, Bronkhorst traces the historical development of "liberating insight" in Buddhism, demonstrating that the concept evolved significantly over time. Early Buddhist texts did not provide a clear definition of what constituted enlightenment. Later, the Four Noble Truths became the dominant framework for understanding liberation. Over time, this emphasis shifted again; in some Hinayana schools, liberation was increasingly understood through the doctrine of no-self (anatta) as a fundamental realization. Schmithausen further observes that Buddhist scriptures contain multiple interpretations of enlightenment, suggesting that even within a single tradition, the nature of ultimate realization was not fixed but subject to doctrinal development and reinterpretation.

These variations challenge the idea that nondual awareness is a universal and timeless mystical experience, instead suggesting that different traditions construct different understandings of what constitutes ultimate reality.

=== Phenomenology ===
Nondual awareness, also called pure consciousness or awareness, contentless consciousness, consciousness-as-such, and Minimal Phenomenal Experience, is a topic of phenomenological research. As described in Samkhya-Yoga and other systems of meditation, and referred to as, for example, Turya and Atman, pure awareness manifests in advanced states of meditation. Pure consciousness is distinguished from the workings of the mind, and "consists in nothing but the being seen of what is seen". Gamma & Metzinger (2021) present twelve factors in their phenomenological analysis of pure awareness experienced by meditators, including luminosity; emptiness and non-egoic self-awareness; and witness-consciousness.

== See also ==
- One taste
- The Void

== Sources ==
- Akizuki, Ryōmin (1990), New Mahāyāna: Buddhism for a Post-modern World, Asian Humanities Press, ISBN 978-0-89581-900-0
- Amidon, Elias (2012), The Open Path: Recognizing Nondual Awareness, Sentient Publications, ISBN 978-1-59181-255-5
- Bělohlávek, Radim; Klir, George J., eds. (2011). Concepts and fuzzy logic. Cambridge, Mass.: MIT Press.
- Bielefeldt, Carl (2015), "A Discussion of Seated Zen", in Lopez, Jr., Donald S. (ed.), Buddhism in Practice: Abridged Edition, Princeton University Press
- Braue, Donald A. (1984), Māyā in Radhakrishnanʾs Thought: Six Meanings Other Than Illusion, Motilall Banarsidass, ISBN 978-0-8364-1129-4
- Bronkhorst, Johannes (1993), The Two Traditions of Meditation in Ancient India, Motilal Banarsidass, ISBN 978-81-208-1114-0
- Burley, Mikel (2006), Classical Samkhya And Yoga: The Metaphysics Of Experience, Taylor & Francis, ISBN 978-0-415-39448-2G
- Buswell, Robert E. (1991), "The 'Short-cut' Approach of K'an-hua Meditation: The Evolution of a Practical Subitism in Chinese Ch'an Buddhism", in Gregory, Peter N. (ed.), Sudden and Gradual: Approaches to Enlightenment in Chinese Thought, Delhi: Motilal Banarsidass, ISBN 978-81-208-0819-5
- Buswell, Robert; Lopez, Donald S. Jr., eds. (2014), The Princeton Dictionary of Buddhism, Princeton University Press, ISBN 978-1-4008-4805-8
- Cabezón, José Ignacio (2005), "Tsong Kha Pa", in Jones, Lindsay (ed.), Encyclopedia of Religion (2nd ed.), Macmillan Reference USA, ISBN 978-0-02-865733-2
- Caplan, Mariana (2009), Eyes Wide Open: Cultivating Discernment on the Spiritual Path, Sounds True, ISBN 978-1-59179-732-6
- Cheng, Hsueh-Li (1981), "The Roots of Zen Buddhism", Journal of Chinese Philosophy, 8 (4): 451–478, doi:10.1111/j.1540-6253.1981.tb00267.x
- Choong, Mun-Keat (1999), The Notion of Emptiness in Early Buddhism, Motilal Banarsidass, ISBN 978-81-208-1649-7
- Comans, Michael (2000), The Method of Early Advaita Vedānta: A Study of Gauḍapāda, Śaṅkara, Sureśvara, and Padmapāda, Delhi: Motilal Banarsidass, ISBN 978-81-208-1722-7
- Conze, Edward (2000) [1968], Thirty Years of Buddhist Studies: Selected Essays, Munshiram Manoharial, ISBN 978-81-215-0960-2
- Dasgupta, Sanghamitra; Mohanta, Dilip Kumar (1998), "Some Reflections on the Relation Between Sankara and Buddhism" (PDF), Indian Philosophical Quarterly, 25 (3): 349–366
- Davis, Leesa S. (2010), Advaita Vedānta and Zen Buddhism: Deconstructive Modes of Spiritual Inquiry, Continuum, ISBN 978-1-4411-4919-0
- Dudjom Rinpoche, Kyabje (2009). "Summary of Striking the Vital Point in Three Statements". Lotsawa House.
- Dumoulin, Heinrich; Heisig, James; Knitter, Paul F. (2005). Zen Buddhism: India and China. World Wisdom, Inc. ISBN 978-0-941532-89-1.
- Espín, Orlando O.; Nickoloff, James B. (2007), An Introductory Dictionary of Theology and Religious Studies, Liturgical Press, ISBN 978-0-8146-5856-7
- Fasching, Wolfgang (2008), "Consciousness, self-consciousness, and meditation", Phenomenology and the Cognitive Sciences, 7 (4): 463–483, doi:10.1007/s11097-008-9090-6, S2CID 144587254
- Flood, Gavin (2005), The Tantric Body: The Secret Tradition of Hindu Religion, I. B. Tauris, ISBN 978-0-85771-730-6
- Ford, James Ishmael (2006). Zen Master Who?: A Guide to the People And Stories of Zen. Wisdom Publications. ISBN 978-0-86171-509-1.
- Fremantle, Francesca (2001). Luminous Emptiness: Understanding the Tibetan Book of the Dead. Boston, MA: Shambhala Publications. ISBN 1-57062-450-X.
- Gamma, Alex; Metzinger, Thomas (14 July 2021), "The Minimal Phenomenal Experience questionnaire (MPE-92M): Towards a phenomenological profile of "pure awareness" experiences in meditators", PLOS ONE, 16 (7) e0253694, Bibcode:2021PLoSO..1653694G, doi:10.1371/journal.pone.0253694, PMC 8279394, PMID 34260614
- Gibbons, Tom (2019). "Oneness in Everyday Life: Nonduality, Wholeness and Human Life After Awakening". Consciousness: Ideas and Research for the Twenty-First Century. California Institute for Integral Studies.
- Gier, Nicholas F. (2013), "Overreaching to be different: A critique of Rajiv Malhotra's Being Different", International Journal of Hindu Studies, 16 (3), Springer Netherlands: 259–285, doi:10.1007/s11407-012-9127-x, ISSN 1022-4556, S2CID 144711827
- Gleig, Ann; Williamson, Lola, eds. (2013), Homegrown Gurus: From Hinduism in America to American Hinduism, SUNY Press, ISBN 978-1-4384-4793-3
- Gleig, Ann (2018). "Embodying Nonduality: Depth Psychology in American Mysticism". In Cattoi, Thomas; Odorisio, David M. (eds.). Depth Psychology and Mysticism. Springer.
- Gombrich, R. F. (1990), "Recovering the Buddha's Message" (PDF), in Skorupski, Tadeusz (ed.), The Buddhist Forum, vol. 1, School of Oriental and African Studies (University of London), ISBN 0-7286-0162-1
- Grimes, John A. (1996). A Concise Dictionary of Indian Philosophy: Sanskrit Terms Defined in English. State University of New York Press. ISBN 978-0-7914-3067-5.
- Grosso, Chriss (2018). Dead Set on Living: Making the Difficult but Beautiful Journey from F#*king Up to Waking Up. Simon and Schuster.
- Haack, Susan (1996). Deviant logic, fuzzy logic: beyond the formalism. Chicago: University of Chicago Press.
- Hanegraaff, Wouter J. (1997), New Age Religion and Western Culture: Esotericism in the Mirror of Secular Thought, State University of New York Press, ISBN 978-1-4384-0565-0
- Hanley, Adam W.; Nakamura, Yoshio; Garland, Eric L. (2018), "The Nondual Awareness Dimensional Assessment (NADA): New Tools to Assess Nondual Traits and States of Consciousness Occurring Within and Beyond the Context of Meditation", Psychological Assessment, 30 (12): 1625–1639, doi:10.1037/pas0000615, PMC 6265073, PMID 30058824
- Hartelius, Glenn (2015). "Non-Duality: Not One, Not Two, but Many (Editor's Introduction)". International Journal of Transpersonal Studies. 34 (1–2). doi:10.24972/ijts.2015.34.1-2.iii.
- Harvey, Peter (1989), "Consciousness Mysticism in the Discourses of the Buddha", in Werner, Karel (ed.), The Yogi and the Mystic: Studies in Indian and Comparative Mysticism, Curzon Press, ISBN 978-0-7007-0272-5
- Harvey, Peter (1990), An introduction to Buddhism. Teachings, history and practices, Cambridge University Press, ISBN 978-0-521-31333-9
- Henning, Hans; Henning, Max (2022). "Origins of Dualism and Nondualism in the History of Religion and Spiritual Practice". Religions. 13 (10): 1004. doi:10.3390/rel13101004.
- Hookham, S.K. (1991). The Buddha Within: Tathagatagarbha Doctrine According to the Shentong Interpretation of the Ratnagotravibhaga. SUNY Press.
- Hori, Victor Sogen (1994), "Teaching and Learning in the Zen Rinzai Monastery", Journal of Japanese Studies, 20 (1): 5–35, doi:10.2307/132782, JSTOR 132782
- Hori, Victor Sogen (2000), "Koan and Kensho in the Rinzai Zen Curriculum", in Heine, Steven; Wright, Dale S. (eds.), The Koan: Texts and Contexts in Zen Buddhism, Oxford: Oxford University Press, ISBN 978-0-19-511749-3
- Hori, Victor Sogen (2005). "The Steps of Koan Practice". In Loori, John Daido (ed.). Sitting With Koans: Essential Writings on Zen Koan Introspection. Wisdom Publications. ISBN 978-0-86171-764-4.
- Isaeva, N. V. (1992), Shankara and Indian Philosophy, SUNY Press
- Jacobs, Alan (2004), Advaita and Western Neo-Advaita. In: The Mountain Path Journal, autumn 2004, pages 81–88, Ramanasramam, archived from the original on 18 May 2015
- Jiyu-Kennett, Houn (2000), MacPhillamy, Daizui (ed.), Roar of the Tigress (PDF), vol. I. An Introduction to Zen: Religious Practice for Everyday Life, Mount Shasta, California: Shasta Abbey Press, ISBN 0-930066-21-9
- Josipovic, Zoran (2019), "Chapter 12 – Nondual awareness: Consciousness-as-such as non-representational reflexivity", Meditation, Progress in Brain Research, vol. 244, Elsevier, pp. 273–298, doi:10.1016/bs.pbr.2018.10.021, ISBN 978-0-444-64227-1, PMID 30732841, S2CID 73418398
- Kalupahana, David J. (1994), A History of Buddhist philosophy, Delhi: Motilal Banarsidass Publishers Private Limited
- Kalupahana, David (2006), Mulamadhyamakakarika of Nagarjuna, Motilal Banarsidass
- Kapleau, Philip (1989), The three pillars of Zen
- Karma Lingpa (1989), Self-Liberation through seeing with naked awareness, Station Hill Press
- Kasulis, Thomas P. (2003), Ch'an Spirituality. In: Buddhist Spirituality. Later China, Korea, Japan and the Modern World; edited by Takeuchi Yoshinori, Delhi: Motilal Banarsidass
- Katz, Jerry (2007), One: Essential Writings on Nonduality, Sentient Publications, archived from the original on 29 November 2021
- King, Richard (1995), Early Advaita Vedānta and Buddhism: The Mahāyāna Context of the Gauḍapādīya-kārikā, SUNY Press
- King, Richard (2002), Orientalism and Religion: Post-Colonial Theory, India and "The Mystic East", Routledge
- King, Sally (1991), Buddha Nature, SUNY Press
- Kipf, David (1979), The Brahmo Samaj and the shaping of the modern Indian mind, Atlantic Publishers & Distri
- Kochumuttom, Thomas A. (1999), A buddhist Doctrine of Experience. A New Translation and Interpretation of the Works of Vasubandhu the Yogacarin, Delhi: Motilal Banarsidass
- Koller, John M. (2006), "Foreword", A thousand teachings: the Upadeśasāhasrī of Śaṅkara, Motilall Banarsidass
- Koller, John M. (2013), "Shankara", in Meister, Chad; Copan, Paul (eds.), Routledge Companion to Philosophy of Religion, Routledge
- Kraft, Kenneth (1997), Eloquent Zen: Daitō and Early Japanese Zen, University of Hawaii Press
- Lai, Whalen (2003), Buddhism in China: A Historical Survey. In Antonio S. Cua (ed.): Encyclopedia of Chinese Philosophy (PDF), New York: Routledge, ISBN 978-1-135-36748-0, archived from the original (PDF) on 12 November 2014
- Larson, Gerald James (1998), Classical Sāṃkhya: An Interpretation of Its History and Meaning, London: Motilal Banarasidass, ISBN 81-208-0503-8
- Larson, G.J. (2014), "Introduction to the Philosophy of Samkhya", in Larson, G.J.; Bhattacharya, R.S. (eds.), The Encyclopedia of Indian Philosophies, Volume 4, Princeton University Press, ISBN 978-0-691-60441-1
- Liang-Chieh (1986), The Record of Tung-shan, William F. Powell (translator), Kuroda Institute
- Lindtner, Christian (1997), "The Problem of Precanonical Buddhism", Buddhist Studies Review, 14 (2): 2, doi:10.1558/bsrv.v14i2.14851, S2CID 247883744
- Lindtner, Christian (1999), "From Brahmanism to Buddhism", Asian Philosophy, 9 (1): 5–37, doi:10.1080/09552369908575487
- Lipner, Julius (2000), "The Self of Being and the Being of Self: Samkara on "That You Are" (Tat Tvam Asi)", in Malkovsky, Bradley J. (ed.), New Perspectives on Advaita Vedānta, BRILL
- Low, Albert (2006), Hakuin on Kensho. The Four Ways of Knowing, Boston & London: Shambhala
- Loy, David (1982), "Enlightenment in Buddhism and Advaita Vedanta: Are Nirvana and Moksha the Same?", International Philosophical Quarterly, 22 (1), doi:10.5840/ipq19822217
- Loy, David (1983). "How Many Nondualities Are There?". Journal of Indian Philosophy. 11 (4): 413–426. doi:10.1007/BF00194265. JSTOR 23444214.
- Loy, David (1988), Nonduality: A Study in Comparative Philosophy, New Haven, Conn: Yale University Press, ISBN 1-57392-359-1
- Loy, David (1997), Nonduality: A Study in Comparative Philosophy, Humanity Books Books, ISBN 1-57392-359-1
- Loy, David (2012), Nonduality: A Study in Comparative Philosophy, Prometheus Books, ISBN 978-1-61614-057-1
- Lucas, Phillip Charles (2011), "When a Movement Is Not a Movement. Ramana Maharshi and Neo-Advaita in North America", Nova Religio: The Journal of Alternative and Emergent Religions, 15 (2): 93–114, doi:10.1525/nr.2011.15.2.93, JSTOR 10.1525/nr.2011.15.2.93
- Maezumi, Hakuyu Taizan; Glassman, Bernie (2007), The Hazy Moon of Enlightenment: Part of the On Zen Practice Series, Wisdom Publications
- Mayeda, Sengaku (2006), "An Introduction to the Life and Thought of Sankara", in Mayeda, Sengaku (ed.), A Thousand Teachings: The Upadeśasāhasrī of Śaṅkara, Motilal Banarsidass, ISBN 978-8120827714
- McCagney, Nancy (1997), Nāgārjuna and the Philosophy of Openness, Rowman & Littlefield
- Mandair, Arvind (September 2006), "The Politics of Nonduality: Reassessing the Work of Transcendence in Modern Sikh Theology", Journal of the American Academy of Religion, 74 (3): 646–673, doi:10.1093/jaarel/lfj002, S2CID 154558545
- Marek, David (2008), Dualität - Nondualität. Konzeptuelles und nichtkonzeptuelles Erkennen in Psychologie und buddhistischer Praxis (PDF)
- McGinn, Bernard (2006), The Essential Writings of Christian Mysticism, New York: Modern Library
- McMahan, David L. (2008), The Making of Buddhist Modernism, Oxford University Press, ISBN 978-0-19-518327-6
- McRae, John (2003), Seeing Through Zen, The University Press Group Ltd, ISBN 978-0-520-23798-8
- Michaelson, Jay (2009), Everything Is God: The Radical Path of Nondual Judaism, Shambhala
- Michelis, Elizabeth De (8 December 2005), A History of Modern Yoga: Patanjali and Western Esotericism, Continuum, ISBN 978-0-8264-8772-8
- Miller, Timothy (1995), America's Alternative Religions, SUNY
- Muller-Ortega, Paul E. (2010), Triadic Heart of Siva: Kaula Tantricism of Abhinavagupta in the Non-Dual Shaivism of Kashmir, Suny press
- Mumon, Yamada (2004), Lectures On The Ten Oxherding Pictures, University of Hawaii Press
- Murti, T.R.V. (2008), The Central Philosophy of Buddhism: A Study of the Madhyamika System, Taylor & Francis Group
- Nagarjuna (1995), The Fundamental Wisdom of the Middle Way: Nagarjuna's Mulamadhyamakakarika, translated by Garfield, Jay L., Oxford University Press, ISBN 978-0-19-997859-5
- Nicholson, Hugh (2011). Comparative Theology and the Problem of Religious Rivalry. Oxford University Press. ISBN 978-0-19-977286-5. Archived from the original on 16 January 2024.
- Norbu, Namkhai (1989), "Foreword", in Reynolds, John Myrdin (ed.), Self-liberation through seeing with naked awareness, Station Hill Press, Inc.
- Paszkiewicz, Joshua R. (2024). Indian Spirituality: An Exploration of Hindu, Jain, Buddhist, and Sikh Traditions. Wellfleet Press.
- Patrul Rinpoche (2008). "The Special Teaching of the Wise and Glorious King". Lotsawa House.
- Potter, Karl (2008), Encyclopedia of Indian Philosophies: Advaita Vedānta, vol. 3, Motilal Banarsidass, ISBN 978-81-208-0310-7
- Rahula, Walpola (2007), What the Buddha Taught (Kindle ed.), Grove Press
- Raju, P.T. (1992), The Philosophical Traditions of India, Delhi: Motilal Banarsidass Publishers Private Limited
- Ray, Reginald (1999), Buddhist Saints in India: A Study in Buddhist Values and Orientations, Oxford University Press
- Reat, N. Ross (1998), The Salistamba Sutra, Motilal Banarsidass
- Reddy Juturi, Ravi Kumar (2021), "Gaudapadacharya "asparsa yoga" for attaining "no mind": A historical method of advaita vedanta for teaching "human liberation" in a profound way", International Journal of Yoga: Philosophy, Psychology and Parapsychology, 9 (2): 67–72, doi:10.4103/2347-5633.329692, S2CID 240322563
- Reynolds, John Myrdin (1989), "Appendix I: The views on Dzogchen of W.Y. Evans-Wentz and C.G. Jung", in Reynolds, John Myrdin (ed.), Self-liberation through seeing with naked awareness, Station Hill Press, Inc.
- Renard, Philip (2010), Non-Dualisme. De directe bevrijdingsweg, Cothen: Uitgeverij Juwelenschip
- Roy, Sumita (2003), Aldous Huxley And Indian Thought, Sterling Publishers Pvt. Ltd
- Samuel, Geoffrey (2008), The Origins of Yoga and Tantra. Indic Religions to the Thirteenth Century, Cambridge University Press
- Samy, AMA (1998), Waarom kwam Bodhidharma naar het Westen? De ontmoeting van Zen met het Westen, Asoka: Asoka
- Sarma, Chandradhar (1996), The Advaita Tradition in Indian Philosophy, Delhi: Motilal Banarsidass
- Sekida, Katsuki (1996), Two Zen Classics. Mumonkan, The Gateless Gate. Hekiganroku, The Blue Cliff Records. Translated with commentaries by Katsuki Sekida, New York / Tokyo: Weatherhill
- Shankarananda Swami (2011), Consciousness Is Everything, Palmer Higgs Pty Ltd
- Sharf, Robert H. (1995), "Buddhist Modernism and the Rhetoric of Meditative Experience" (PDF), NUMEN, 42 (3): 228–283, doi:10.1163/1568527952598549, hdl:2027.42/43810, archived from the original (PDF) on 12 April 2019
- Sharma, B. N. Krishnamurti (2000), History of the Dvaita School of Vedānta and Its Literature: From the Earliest Beginnings to Our Own Times, Motilal Banarsidass Publishers, ISBN 978-81-208-1575-9
- Sooklal, Anil (1993), "The Neo-Vedanta Philosophy of Swami Vivekananda", Nidan, 5
- Spilka, Bernard; Hood, Ralph W. Jr.; Hunsberger, Bruce; Gorsuch, Richard (2003), The Psychology of Religion: An Empirical Approach (3rd ed.), New York: The Guilford Press, ISBN 978-1-57230-901-2
- Srinivasan, Narayan (August 2020), "Consciousness Without Content: A Look at Evidence and Pospects", Frontiers in Psychology, 11 1992, doi:10.3389/fpsyg.2020.01992, PMC 7426455, PMID 32849160
- Stearns, Cyrus (2010), The Buddha from Dölpo: A Study of the Life and Thought of the Tibetan Master Dölpopa Sherab Gyaltsen (Rev. and enl. ed.), Ithaca, NY: Snow Lion Publications, ISBN 978-1-55939-343-0
- Stone, Jacqueline I. (2003). Original Enlightenment and the Transformation of Medieval Japanese Buddhism. University of Hawaii Press.
- Swartz, James, How to Attain Enlightenment: The Vision of Non-Duality, Sentient+ORM
- Sydnor, Jon Paul (2023). "Introduction". In Sydnor, Jon Paul; Watson, Anthony J. (eds.). Nondualism: An Interreligious Exploration. Bloomsbury Publishing.
- Taft, Michael (2014), Nondualism: A Brief History of a Timeless Concept, Cephalopod Rex
- Tanahashi, Kazuaki (2018). Painting Peace: Art in a Time of Global Crisis. Shambhala Publications.
- Taves, Ann (2016), Revelatory Events: Three Case Studies of the Emergence of New Spiritual Paths, Princeton University Press
- Versluis, Arthur (1993), American Transcendentalism and Asian Religions, Oxford University Press
- Versluis, Arthur (2014), American Gurus: From American Transcendentalism to New Age Religion, Oxford University Press
- Volker, Fabian (2021). "Nondualism". In Goetz, Stewart; Taliafero, Charles (eds.). The Encyclopedia of the Philosophy of Religion. John Wiley & Sons.
- Volker, Fabian (2023). "The Plurality of Nonduality: Toward a Tripartite Typology". In Sydnor, Jon Paul; Watson, Anthony J. (eds.). Nondualism: An Interreligious Exploration. Bloomsbury Publishing.
- Walshe, Maurice (1995), The Long Discourses of the Buddha. A Translation of the Digha Nikaya, Wisdom Publications
- White, David Gordon (2000), Yoga in practice, Princeton University Press
- Williams, Paul (2000), Buddhist Thought, Routledge
- Williams, Paul (2008), Mahayana Buddhism: The Doctrinal Foundations, Routledge, ISBN 978-1-134-25057-8
- Wolfe, Robert (2009), Living Nonduality: Enlightenment Teachings of Self-Realization, Karina Library Press
- Wynne, Alexander (2007), The Origin of Buddhist Meditation (PDF), Routledge
- Zimmer, Heinrich (1989) [1951], Philosophies of India, Princeton University Press
- Yandell, Keith E. (1994), The Epistemology of Religious Experience, Cambridge University Press
- Yelle, Robert A. (2012), "Comparative Religion as Cultural Combat: Occidentalism and Relativism in Rajiv Malhotra's Being Different", International Journal of Hindu Studies, 16 (3): 335–348, doi:10.1007/s11407-012-9133-z, S2CID 144950049
- Yen, Chan Master Sheng (1996), Dharma Drum: The Life and Heart of Ch'an Practice, Boston & London: Shambhala
- Young, Mry Angelon (2015). On the Road to Enlightened Duality: Reflections on Impermanence, Beauty, and the Path of Transformation. SCB Distributors.
