= Vimarśa =

Philosophical concept in Shaivism

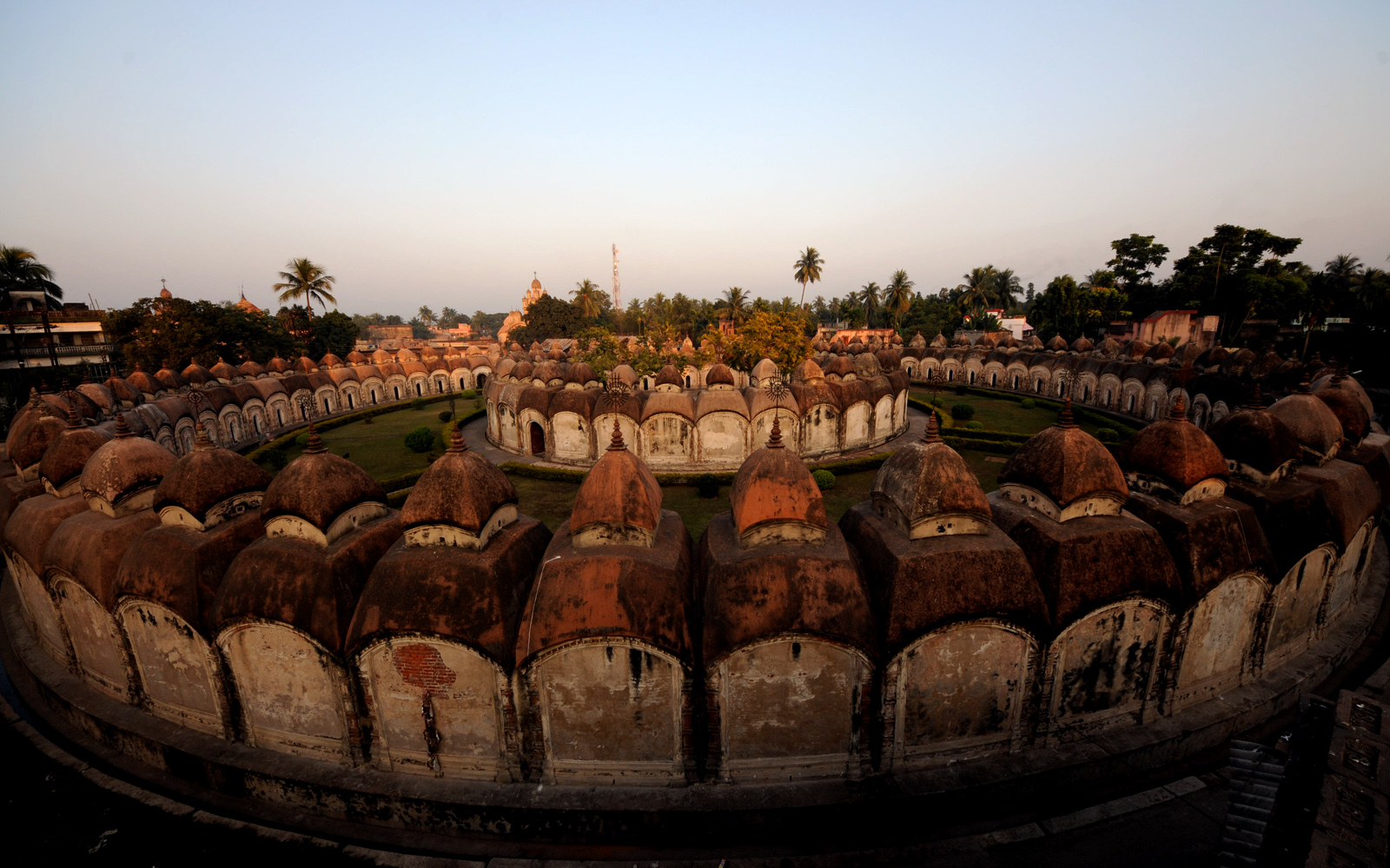
Shiva temples in Kalna

Vimarśa is a philosophical concept in Shaivism that comes from the "Recognition" (Pratyabhijñā) philosophy, introduced by Utpaladeva and Abhinavagupta, two eminent masters in Kashmir Śaivism from around the 9th and 10th centuries.

As per the Pratyabhijñā philosophy, Vimarśa and Prakāśa are seen as two aspects of consciousness. Dr. Sthaneshwar Timalsina, founder of the Vimarsha Foundation , in his paper describes Prakāśa as a light that helps us see things within and around us, while Vimarśa makes us aware of our seeing. These elements are closely linked and depend on each other.

In contrast to the passive nature of consciousness in Advaita Vedanta, Abhinavagupta characterizes consciousness in Pratyabhijñā as active and free (svātantrya), able to take many forms. Indeed, In Kashmir Śaivism, the Sanskrit term "Caitanyam" refers to more than just consciousness. It signifies an awareness of a conscious reality, known as "cetana," characterized by complete freedom in knowledge and action. Caitanyam is considered the fundamental nature of reality, encompassing consciousness (cit) and bliss (ananda). It manifests through will (iccha), knowledge (jnana), and activity (kriya). Vimarśa isn't just about noticing things; it's about the desire to show itself in different ways (icchā-śakti).

== Introduction ==
In his book, Mark S. G. Dyczkowski discusses how consciousness is metaphorically perceived as an ocean, with its expressions as waves. These waves come from and go back to the ocean, showing they're all part of the same thing. Every wave, like every moment of consciousness, is unique but made of the same substance as the ocean, which illustrates the dynamic nature of being consciously involved in life. As stated by Abhinavagupta, in his commentary on Īśvarapratyabhijñā, Vimarśa lets us decide and act on our own.

Moreover, Utpaladeva says that Vimarśa assists individuals in perceiving each emotion or experience, such as joy or pain, as an integral part of oneself. It highlights the interconnectedness of all experiences, aiding in the recognition of life as a cohesive whole, where everything is a reflection of oneself. He also notes that Vimarśa is at work when we recognize cause and effect, such as knowing there's a fire because we smell smoke.

Speech, another aspect of consciousness, lets us turn what we see and feel into words, whether we speak them out loud or think them. Abhinavagupta claims that when we stop trying to label everything or claim it as ours, our speech matches up with Vimarśa. This suggests we all have the ability to see that the reality we discuss is just a small part of our vast consciousness.

== Importance of vimarśa and prakāśa on the cosmogeny of Pratyabhijñā ==
The cosmogeny of Trika utilizes the notion of vimarśa along with the closely following notion of prakāśa. While prakāśa refers to fundamental subjective awareness which forms the fundamental nature of all objects of cognition, vimarśa refers to the act of judgement that leads to the recognition of all objects. Prakāśa is understood to be of the nature of illumination and vimarśa that of reflexivity, and these two held to form the most essential nature of consciousness in Pratyabhijñā thought. These two ideas also engender the metaphysical idea that the Self-Experience of Lord Siva is the primary metaphysical basis of all human experiences, especially those that explain the "ontological categories such as causality, time and action". This leads to the idea that ultimately all phenomena have being generated by recognition.

This relation between awareness and recognition leads to position of Pratyabhijñā thinkers that the recognition of all objective phenomena is not other that the subjective awareness of the experiencer, i.e. an act of self-recognition. This in turn leads to the Pratyabhijñā thinkers' cosmogenic position of Śiva's emanation through Śakti.

The Supreme Lord, who has the nature of awareness (prakāśa), makes His own Self into an object of cognition, even though it is not an object of cognition, because the cognizer is unitary. This is supposed by means of a firm inference making the supposition, which has shown the impossibility of another cause [that is the impossibility of external objects as the causes of the diverse things we experience-which was demonstrated in the prakāśa arguments]. Therefore ... by reason of [His] agency, having the character of Sakti which is recognitive judgment (vimarśa) -as He recognitively apprehends (parāmṛśati) His Self, so, because everything is contained within Him, He appears as blue, and so forth

== Vimarśa as basis for veridical knowledge ==
Vimarśa, more than simply being a descriptor of cognitive phenomena, is taken to be an enabler of veridical cognition. As such, vimarśa is necessary for an individual's ability to process the various impulses, whether subjective or from the environment, into consciousness. Timalsina states:

Vimarśa, therefore is more than reflexivity of consciousness in confirming its own mode, as it is a crucial factor of enabling perception and inference and it also gives rise to veridical knowledge. The operation that makes an instance of knowledge veridical, in Abhinavagupta's thesis, results in reflexivity. It is due to this reflexivity that an instance of consciousness becomes a veridical means of knowledge

== Vimarśa as basis for bliss ==
Vimarśan allows cognition in a person to effect both self-awareness and also the perception of an external reality, thus leading to perception of the multiplicity of reality. The reflexivity of vimarśa forms a fundamental quality of consciousness that allows the rise of bliss in the perception of materiality, leading to "a fulfilment of consciousness expressing itself in myriad forms and actualizing all those forms within its immanence".

== Applications of vimarśa in Kaula and yoginī practices ==
Kerry M. Skora considers the Pratyabhijñā thinkers Abhinavagupta to hold vimarśa to be an act of recognition that is not separated from a persons body, so that vimarśa leads to the "gathering together the parts of one's self that have been dispersed out into the world of objectivity and that have caused one to forget the self's connection to Śiva-Bhairava". This in turn relates to the utility of bodily bliss in kaula and yoginī practices. Abhinavagupta states these practices to lead to an expansion of consciousness caused by enjoyment, and this is itself an act of reflexive awareness or vimarśa that have both the outward flow of consciousness and the inward flow of energy occurring simultaneously. Abhinavagupta states:

At the time of the intense reflexive awareness of one's own-form, [which is] an opening [of consciousness] towards each of one's own various enjoyments, one after the other the goddesses of the secondary wheels reach the center wheel of consciousness

Abhinavagupta thus holds worship to include sensual acts capable of awakening one's consciousness through bliss.

== Related readings ==
In exploring Kashmir Shaivism and related philosophical debates, several scholarly works offer in-depth insights :

- R.C. Dwivedi's 1992 article "BHARTṚHARI AND KASHMIR ŚAIVISM," published in the Annals of the Bhandarkar Oriental Research Institute, examines the intersections between Bhartṛhari's philosophy and Kashmir Shaivism, highlighting the mutual influences between these thought streams (vol. 72/73, pp. 95–107, JSTOR 41694884),
- Alex Watson, in "Further Thoughts on Rāmakaṇṭha's Relationship to Earlier Positions in the Buddhist-Brāhmaṇical Ātman Debate" (Brill, 2020), analyzes the complex relationships between Rāmakaṇṭha's positions and earlier debates on the ātman, shedding light on the interreligious dialogues of the time (pp. 87–105, ISBN 978-90-04-43266-6, JSTOR 10.1163/j.ctv2gjwvrz.12)
- Gerald James Larson's 1976 article "The Aesthetic (Rasāsvadā) and the Religious (Brahmāsvāda) in Abhinavagupta's Kashmir Śaivism," published in Philosophy East and West, discusses the aesthetic and religious dimensions in Abhinavagupta's work, offering a detailed analysis of how these aspects are manifested in Kashmir Shaivism (vol. 26, no. 4, pp. 371–387, doi:10.2307/1398282, JSTOR 1398282).
