= Vikramashila =

Site of a medieval university in India

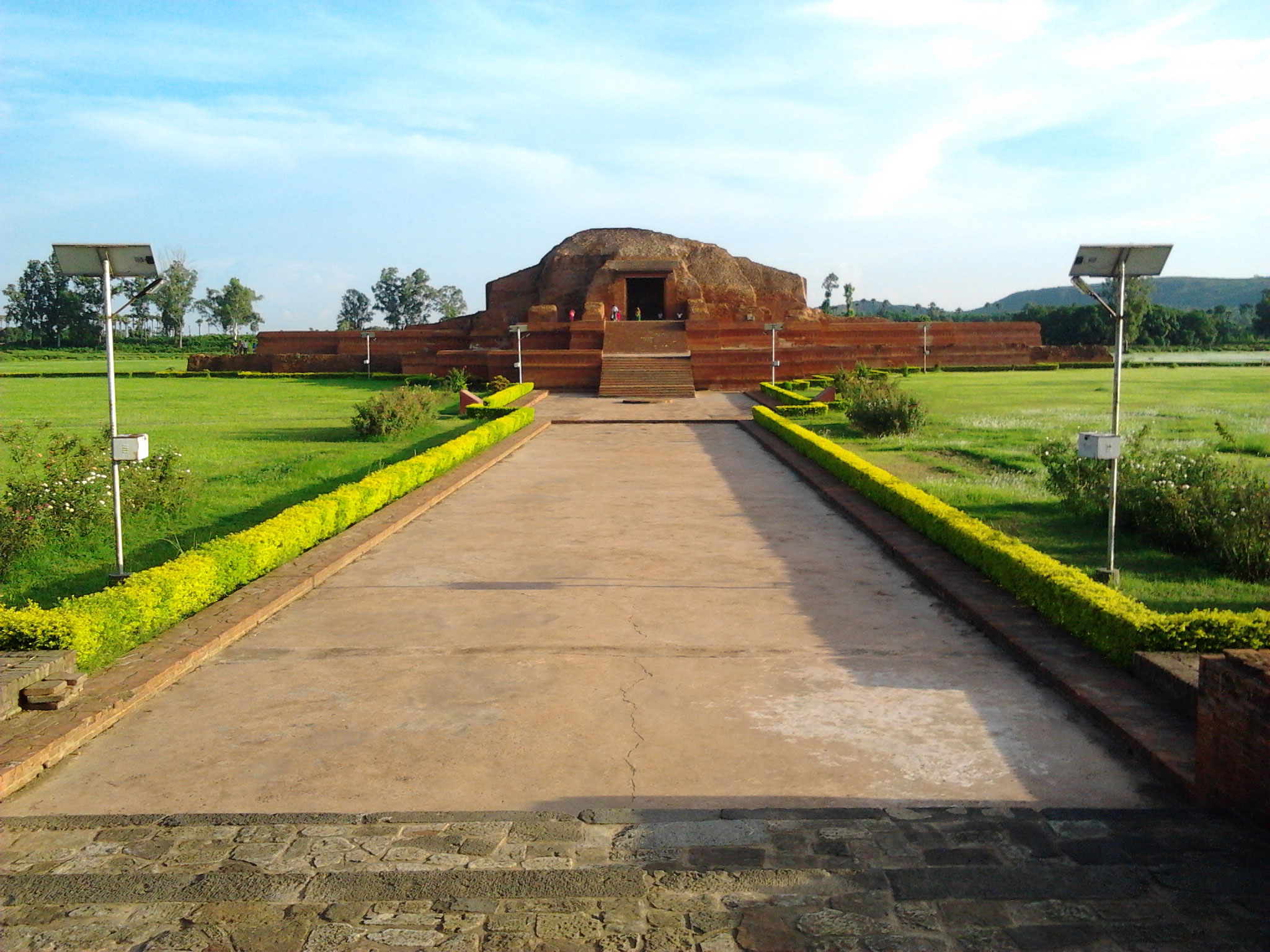
- The ruins of Vikramashila Buddhist Mahavihara
- Interactive map of Vikramashila
- Type: Centre of learning
- Location: Kahalgaon, Bhagalpur, Bihar, India

History
- Built: 8th–9th century CE
- Abandoned: 13th century CE
- Event: Destroyed by Muhammad bin Bakhtiyar Khalji around 1193

Vikramashila (IAST: Vikramaśīla) was a Buddhist monastic university situated in what is now modern-day Bihar in India. It was founded by King Dharmapala between the late eighth and early ninth centuries.

It was one of the three most important Buddhist Mahaviharas of its time in India, along with Nalanda and Odantapuri. Its location is now the site of Antichak village near Kahalgaon, Bhagalpur district in Bihar. It was one of the largest Buddhist mahaviharas, with more than one hundred teachers and about one thousand students. It produced eminent scholars who were often invited by foreign countries to spread Buddhist learning, culture and religion including Atiśa and Ratnākaraśānti.

Vikramashila was established by the Pala emperor Dharmapala (783–820 CE) in response to a supposed decline in the quality of scholarship at Nalanda. It was destroyed by the forces of Muhammad bin Bakhtiyar Khalji around 1193.

== History ==
A number of monasteries grew up during the Pāla period in medieval Bengal and Magadha. According to Tibetan sources, five great Mahaviharas stood out: Vikramashila, the premier university of the era; Nalanda, past its prime but still illustrious, Somapura, Odantapura, and Jagaddala. The five monasteries formed a network; "all of them were under state supervision" and there existed "a system of co-ordination among them. It seems from the evidence that the different seats of Buddhist learning that functioned in eastern India under the Pāla were regarded together as forming a network, an interlinked group of institutions," and it was common for great scholars to move easily from position to position among them.

Vikramashila was founded by Pāla king Dharmapala in the late 8th or early 9th century. It prospered for about four centuries before it was destroyed by Bakhtiyar Khilji along with the other major centres of Buddhism in Eastern India around 1193.

Vikramashila is known to us mainly through Tibetan sources, especially the writings of Tāranātha, the Tibetan monk historian of the 16th–17th centuries.

Vikramashila was one of the largest Buddhist universities, with more than one hundred teachers and about one thousand students. It produced eminent scholars who were often invited by foreign countries to spread Buddhist learning, culture and religion.

One such scholar was Atisha Dipankara, a founder of the Sarma traditions of Tibetan Buddhism. Subjects like philosophy, grammar, metaphysics, Indian logic etc. were taught here, but the most important branch of learning was Buddhist tantra.

== Organisation ==
According to scholar Sukumar Dutt, Vikramashila appears to have had a more clearly delineated hierarchy than other mahaviharas, as follows:

- Abbot (Adhyakṣa)
- Six gate protectors or gate scholars (Dvārapāla or Dvārapaṇḍita), one each for the Eastern, Western, First Central, Second Central, Northern, and Southern Gates.
- Great Scholars (Mahapaṇḍita)
- Scholars (Paṇḍita), roughly 108 in number
- Professors or Teachers (Upādhyāya or Āchārya), roughly 160 in number including paṇḍits
- Resident monks (bhikṣu), roughly 1,000 in number

According to Tāranātha, at Vikramashila's peak during the reign of King Chanaka (955–83), the dvārapāla were as follows: Ratnākaraśānti (Eastern Gate), Vāgīsvarakīrti (Western Gate), Ratnavajra (First Central Gate), Jñanasrimitra (Second Central Gate), Naropa (Northern Gate), and Prajñākaramati (Southern Gate).

== Notable scholars ==
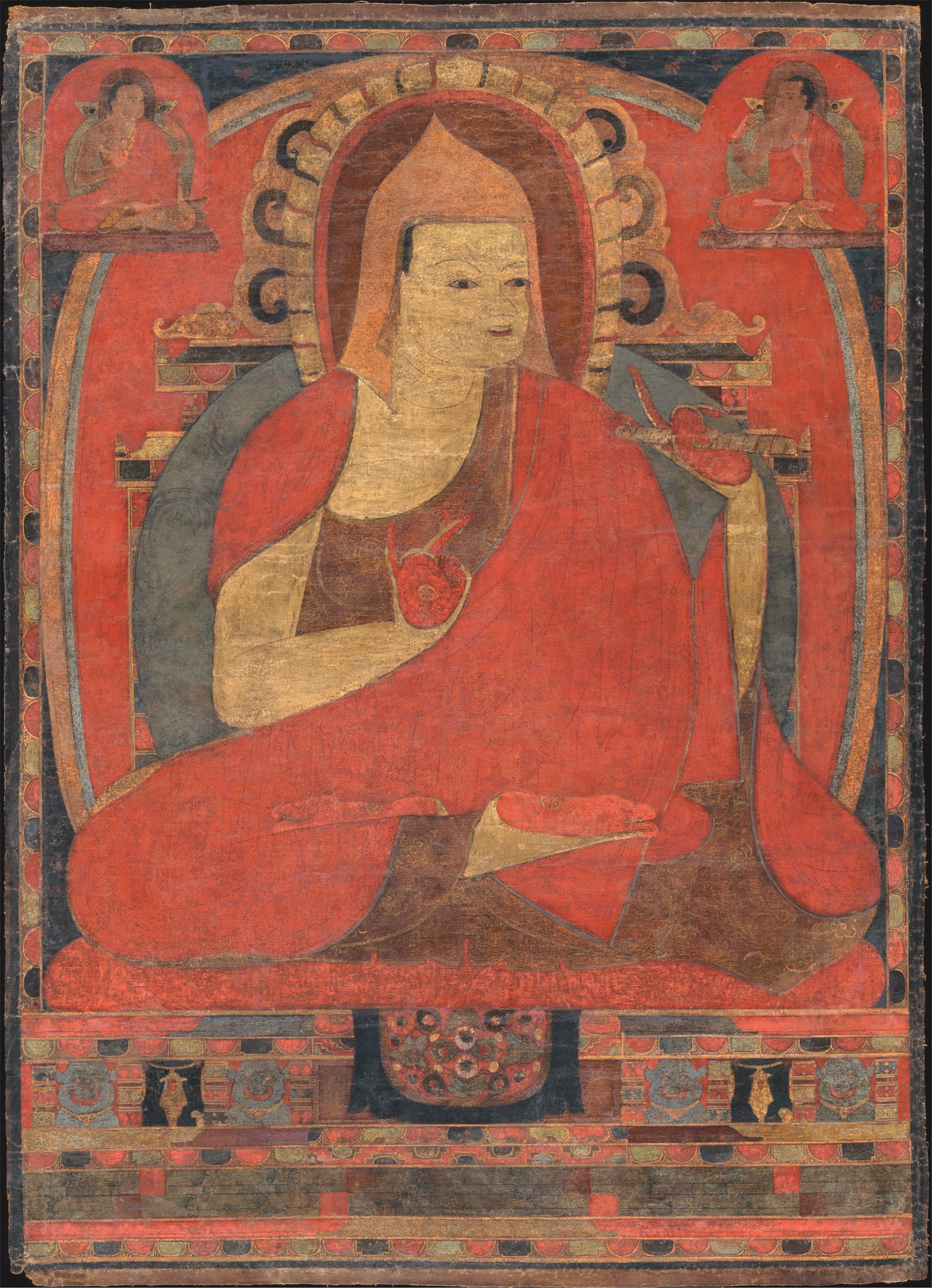
Atisa, one of the abbots of Vikramashila

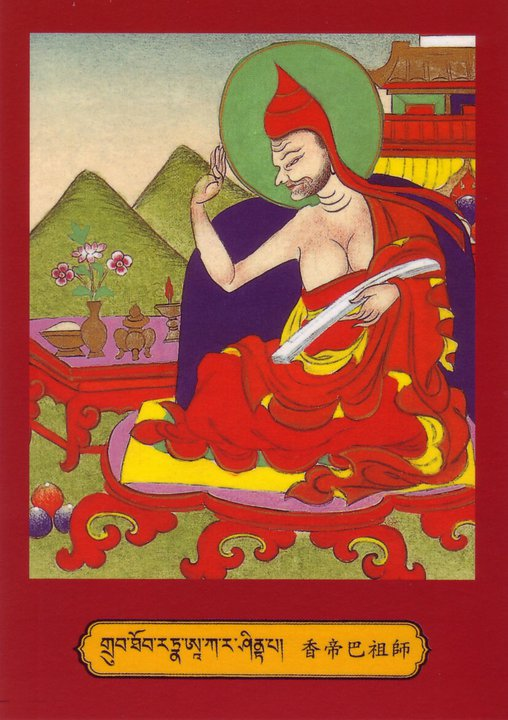
11th-century Vajrayana Buddhist philosopher, Ratnākaraśānti

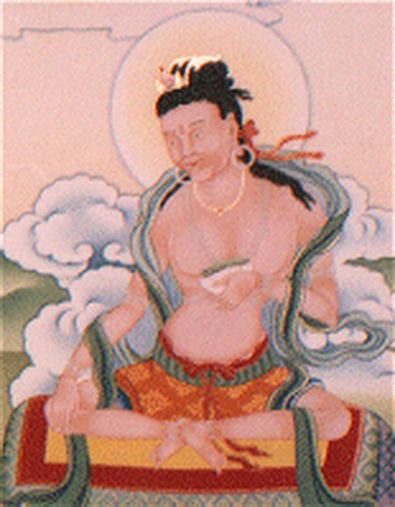
11th-century Buddhist scholar who spent time at Vikramashila, Maitripada

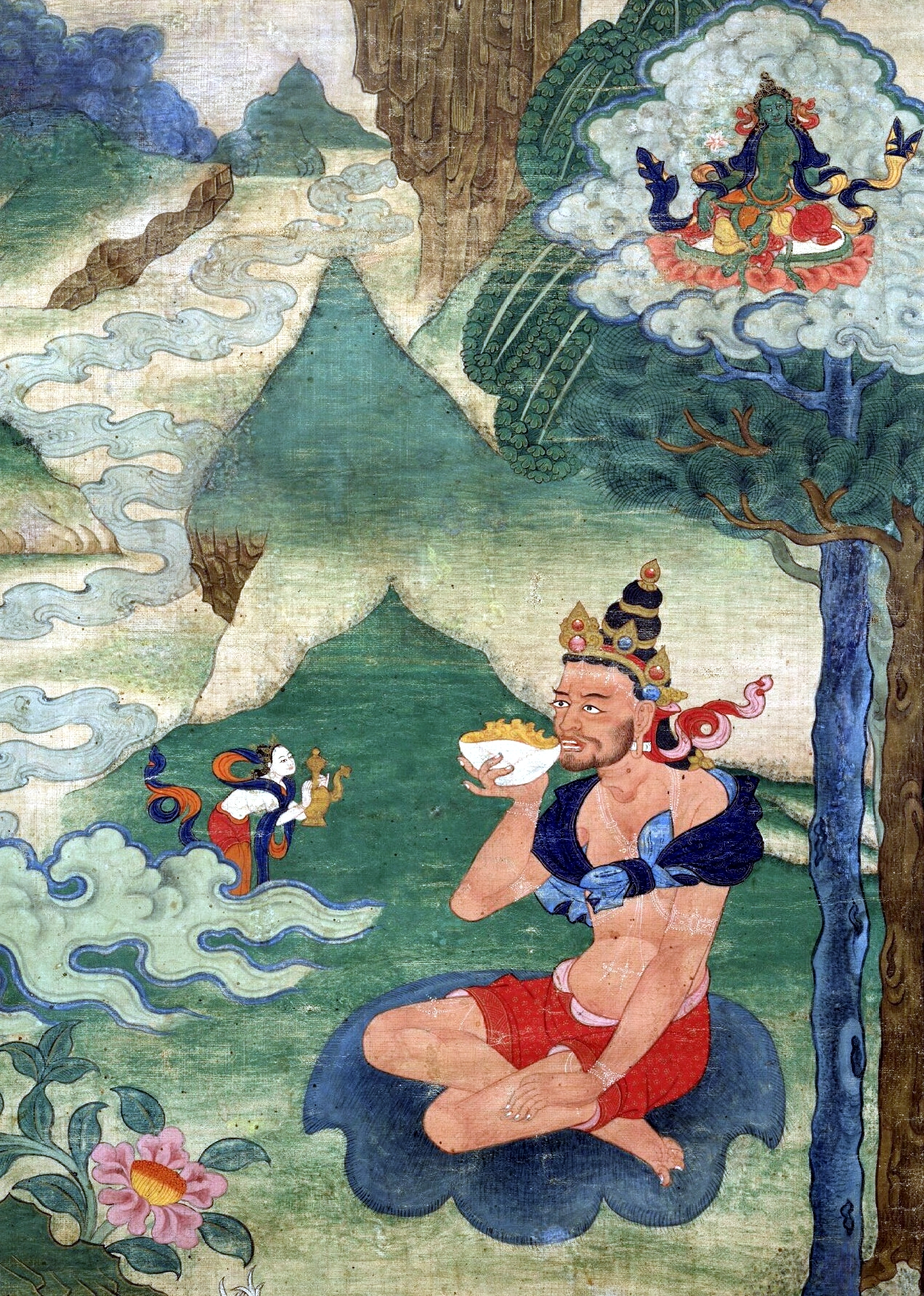
Painting of Naropa, "northern gatekeeper" of Vikramashila,

Some of the figures who either studied or taught at Vikramashila include:

- Abhayakaragupta
- Ānandagarbha
- Atiśa
- Buddhajñānapāda
- Dampa Sangye, 11th century Buddhist teacher active in Tibet
- Drogmi
- Jitāri
- Jñanasrimitra
- Haribhadra
- Maitripada
- Naropa
- Ratnākaraśānti
- Ratnakīrti
- Śākyaśribhadra, last abbot of Vikramashila during the late 12th and early 13th century
- Subhūticandra, Indian Buddhist scholar active in the 11th and 12th century
- Vāgīśvarakīrti, 11th-century Indian Buddhist scholar and one of the gatekeepers at Vikramashila

=== Tantric preceptors ===
Vikramaśīla was a centre for Vajrayana and employed Tantric preceptors. The first was Buddhajñānapāda, followed by Dīpaṁkarabhadra and Jayabhadra. The first two were active during Dharmapāla's reign, the third in the early to mid portion of the 9th century. Jayabhadra, a monk from Sri Lanka, was the first prominent commentator on the Cakrasamvara tantra. Śrīdhara was the next preceptor, followed by Bhavabhaṭṭa. The latter, also a prominent commentator on Cakrasamvara, may have been the mahāsiddha Bhadrapāda. He in turn was succeeded by three more prominent Cakrasamvara commentators, Bhavyakīrti, Durjayachandra, and Tathāgatarakṣita. Durjayachandra collaborated with the renowned Tibetan translator Rinchen Zangpo and his commentary became particularly important for the Sakya school, and Tathāgatarakṣita collaborated with Rin-chen grags.

In chronological order:

1. Buddhajñānapāda
2. Dīpaṁkarabhadra
3. Jayabhadra
4. Śrīdhara
5. Bhavabhaṭṭa
6. Bhavyakīrti
7. Līlavājra
8. Durjaychandra
9. Samayavajra
10. Tathāgatarakṣita
11. Bodhibhadra
12. Kamalarakṣita

== Archeological site ==
=== Layout and excavation ===
The remains of the monastery have been partially excavated in Kahalgaon, Bhagalpur district, Bihar state, India, and the process is still underway. Meticulous excavation at the site was conducted initially by B. P. Sinha of Patna University (1960–69) and subsequently by Archaeological Survey of India (1972–82). It has revealed a huge square monastery with a cruciform stupa in its centre, a library building and cluster of votive stupas.

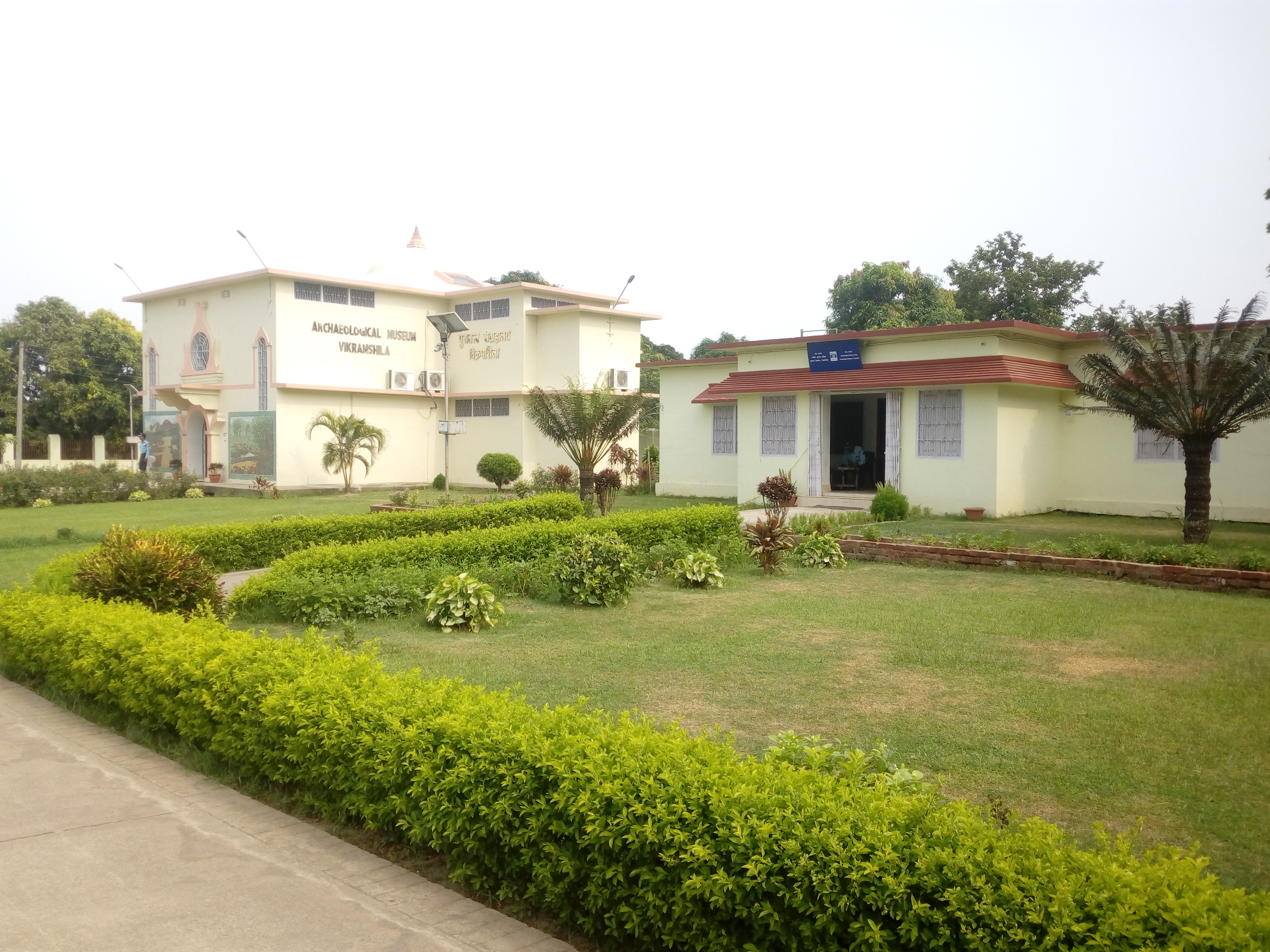
Vikramshila Museum, Kahalgaon

The monastery, or residence for the Buddhist monks, is a huge square structure, each side measuring 330 metres having a series of 208 cells, 52 on each of the four sides opening into a common verandah. A few brick arched underground chambers beneath some of the cells have also been noticed which were probably meant for confined meditation by the monks.

The main stupa built for the purpose of worship is a brick structure laid in mud mortar which stands in the centre of the square monastery. This two-terraced stupa is cruciform on plan and about 15 metres high from the ground level accessible through a flight of steps on the north side. On each of the four cardinal directions there is a protruding chamber with a pillared antechamber and a separate pillared mandapa in front. In the four chambers of the stupa were placed colossal stucco images of seated Buddha of which three were found in situ but the remaining one on north side was possibly replaced by a stone image after the clay image was somehow damaged.

About 32 metres south of the monastery on its south west corner and attached with the main monastery through a narrow corridor is a rectangular structure identified as a library building. It was air-conditioned by cooled water of the adjoining reservoir through a range of vents in the back wall. The system was perhaps meant for preserving delicate manuscripts.

A large number of antiquities of different materials, unearthed from this place in the course of excavation, are displayed in the site museum maintained by the Archaeological Survey of India.

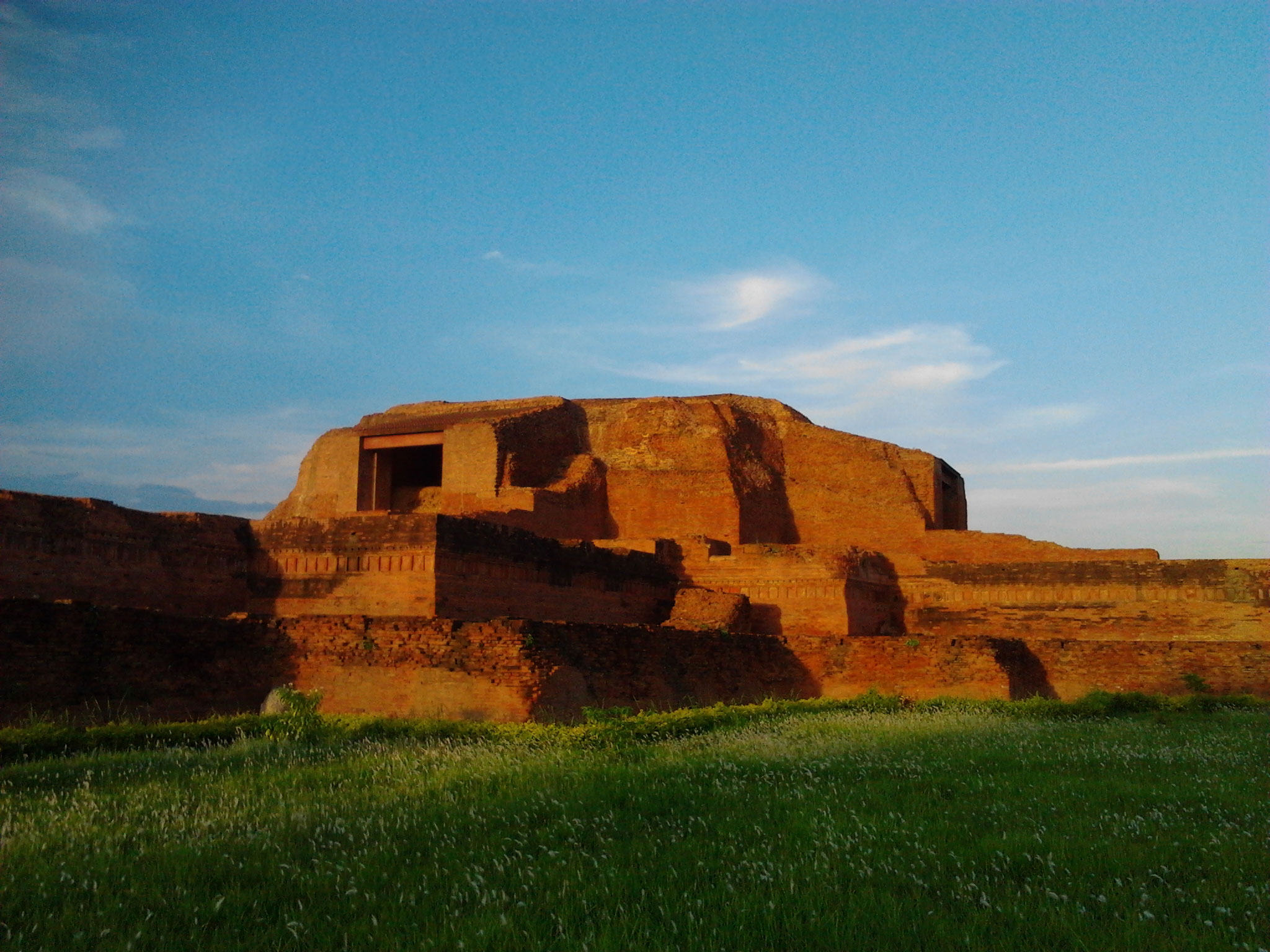
Main stupa at the centre

=== The Stupa ===
The Stupa is a sacred solid structure raised over the body remains or belongings of Buddha or a distinguished monk; or to commemorate any event associated with them. But some stupas are merely symbolic made for worship by the monks. A votive stupa is a miniature stupa erected by a devotee in gratitude of fulfilment of his desire.

The Vikramashila stupa built for the purpose of worship is a brick structure laid in mud mortar and stands in the centre of the square monastery. This two terraced stupa is cruciform on plan and about 15 metres high from the ground level. The lower terrace is about 2.25 metres high from the ground level and the upper terrace is at a similar height from the lower side. At both terraces there is a circumambulatory path, the lower about 4.5 metres wide and the upper about 3 metres wide.

The main stupa placed over the upper terrace is accessible through a flight of steps on the north side on each of the four cardinal directions. There is a protruding chamber with a pillared antechamber and a separate pillared mandapa in front, placed beyond the circumambulatory passage. In the four chambers of stupa were placed colossal stucco images of seated Buddha of which three were found in situ, but the remaining of the north side was possibly replaced by a stone image after the clay image was somehow damaged. All the stucco images are unfortunately broken above the waist. The images are placed over a brick pedestal having traces of painting in red and black pigments. The walls and floors of the chamber and antechamber were plastered with lime.

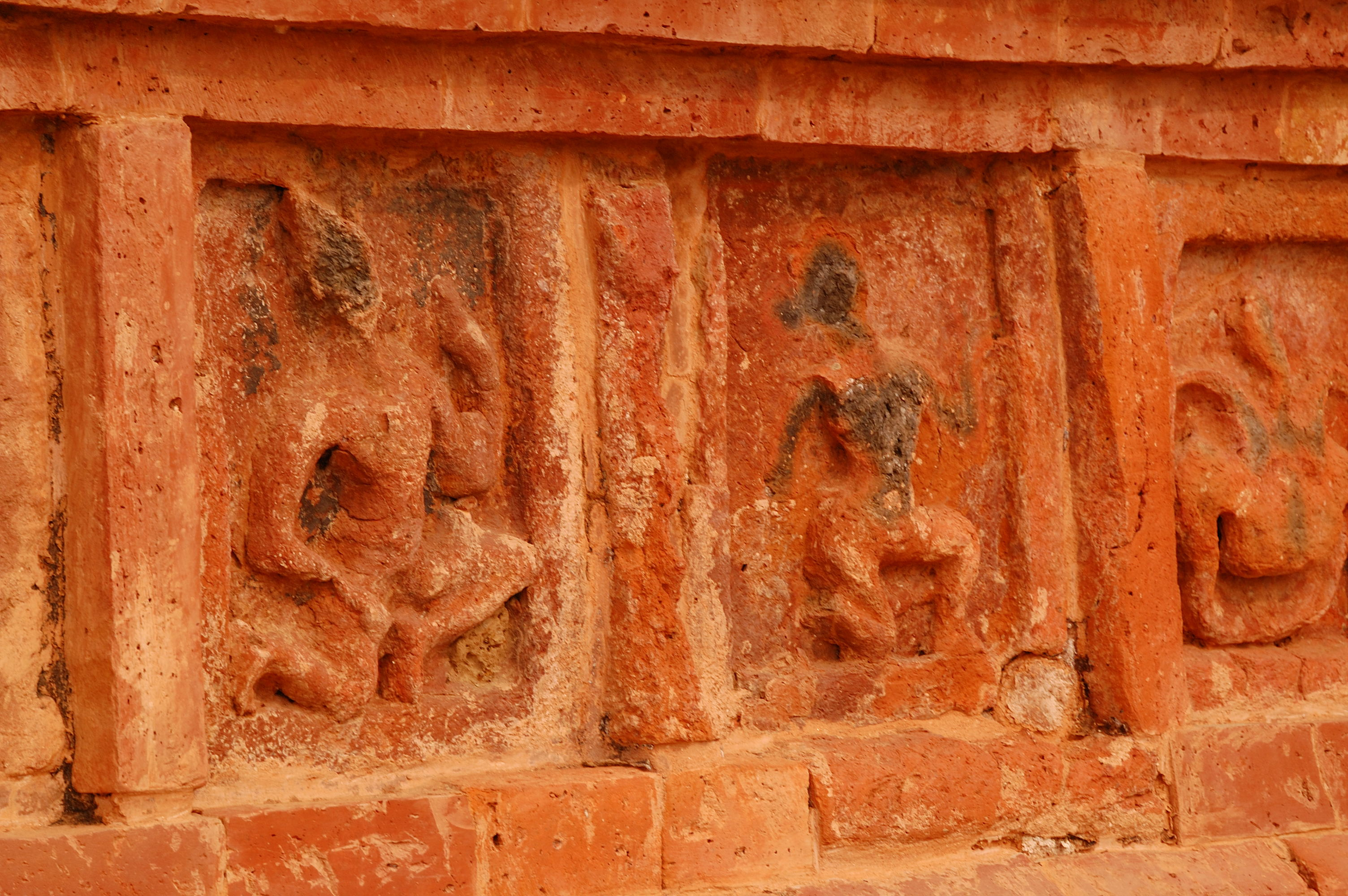
The wall carvings of various deities

The walls of both the terraces are decorated with mouldings and terracotta plaques which testify the high excellence of terracotta art flourishing in the region during Pal period (8th to 12th centuries). The plaques depict many Buddhist deities like Buddha, Avalokiteshvara, Manjusri, Maitreya, Jambala, Marichi, and Tara, scenes related to Buddhism, some social and hunting scenes, and a few other Indian deities like Vishnu, Parvati, Ardhanarisvara and Hanuman. Many human figures, like those of ascetics, yogis, preachers, drummers, warriors, archers, snake charmers, etc., and animal figures like monkeys, elephants, horses, deer, boar, panthers, lions, wolves, and birds, are also depicted.

The architecture of the stupa and the terracotta plaques bear great resemblance to the Somapura Mahavihara, Paharpur (Bangladesh) which, too, was founded by the same king Dharmapala. In plan both are very much alike with the significant difference that Somapura is centred on a central temple rather than a stupa. Vikramashila monastery is also larger and has fort-like projections on its outer wall.

=== Library ===
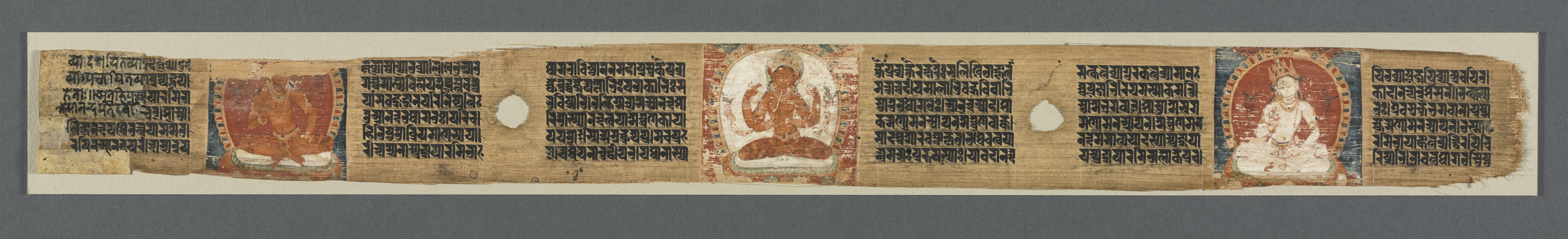
Painted manuscript of the Prajnaparamita from Vikramashila dated to the late 12th century CE

The vast majority of the manuscripts contained within Vikramashila’s library have been lost following multiple historical upheavals including the Muslim raids of East India led by Bakhtiyar Khalji. Many of manuscripts fell prey to natural decay as the climate of the Indo-Gangetic plains is not favourable to the preservation of palm-leaf manuscripts. However, some of the manuscripts of Vikramashila’s library, have been discovered in Nepal and Tibet as many of the Buddhist monks fled to these regions following the collapse of the monastery. So far, five manuscripts have been identified that contain references to Vikramashila. One of these manuscripts is currently held at the British Library references the ‘Glorious Great Monastery of the King Vikramaśīla’ (śrīmadvikramaśīladevamahāvihāra) as the place of production and contains the text of the Aṣṭasāhasrikā Prajñāpāramitā.

=== Restoration work ===
Vikramashila was neglected for years which contributed to the extensive damage to the monument. The Archeological Survey of India is now planning to develop the excavated site of Vikramashila.

Since 2009, there has been considerable work in maintaining and beautifying the place to attract tourism. There has been inflow of western tourists as well, during their river cruises on the Ganga River.

It has been a long-time demand of local people for revival of this university like Nalanda university. In 2015, prime minister Narendra Modi announced a Rs 500 crore package for it, while state Government had to provide around 500 acres land which was yet to be done. President Pranab Mukherjee visited the excavated ruins of Vikramshila university in 2017. He addressed a public gathering at the university, saying that he would talk to the Prime minister for its revival.

== How to reach there ==
The nearest big town is Kahalgaon about 13 km, It is approachable through 11 km long motorable road diverting from NH-80 at Anadipur, about 2 km from Kahalgaon. Bikramshila railway station and Kahalgaon railway station are situated on the Sahibganj Loop line near the area.

Lately river cruises from Kolkata to Varanasi have started, which also stop by the Vikramashila ruins.

== Popular culture ==
An Indian Railways train recognises this place by running a Train No. 12367/12368 Vikramshila Express that runs from Anand Vihar, Delhi to Bhagalpur, Bihar.

The Vikramashila site is the place for Vikramashila Mahotsav, which is held annually during the month of February.

== Gallery ==
Ruins of Vikramashila

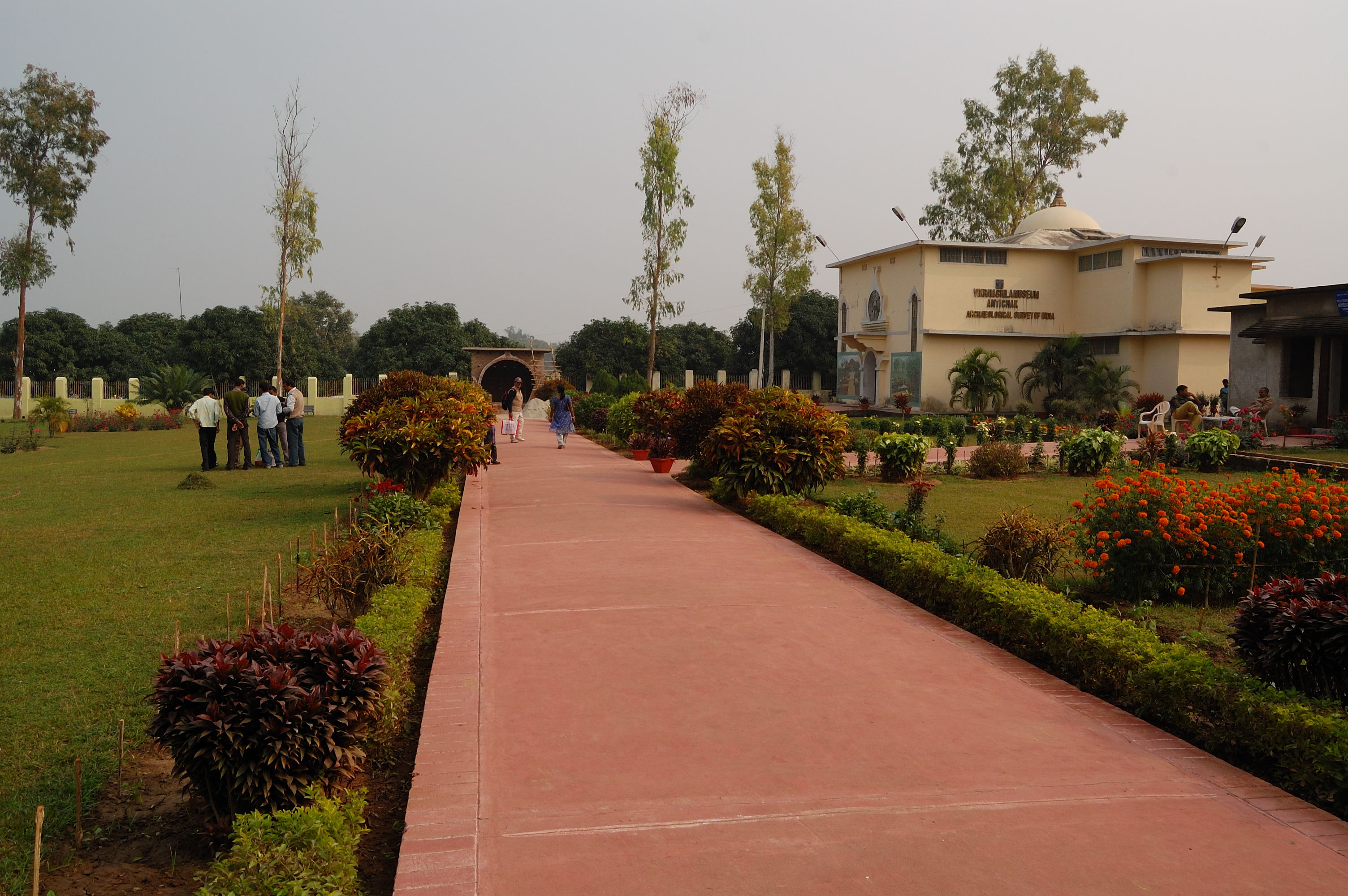
The Vikramashila Museum at the entrance of the Excavation site. It holds many exhibits which have been excavated from the ruins, these include monuments, art figures, utensils, coins, weapons and jewellery.

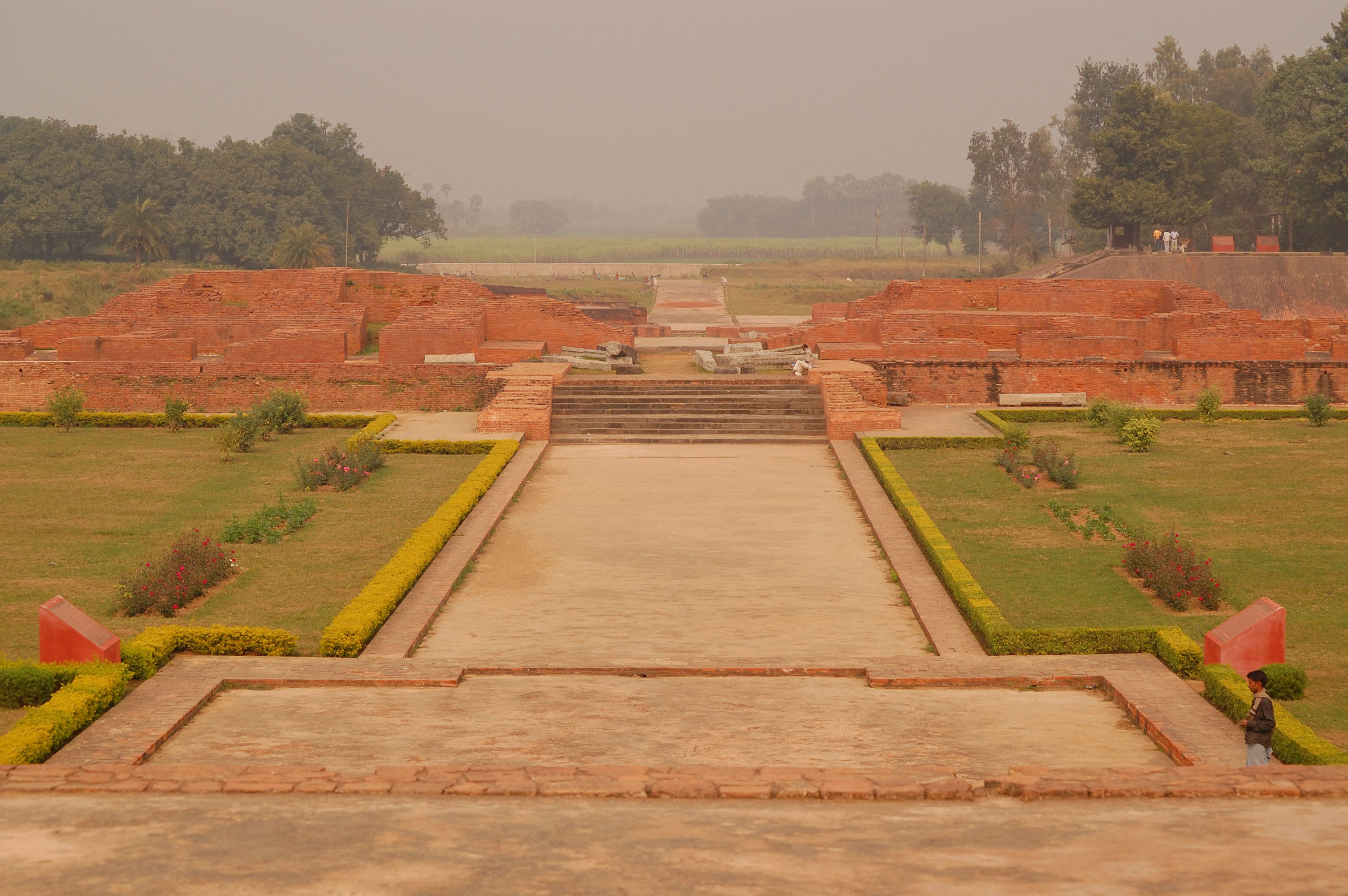
The view of the entrance from the Stupa.

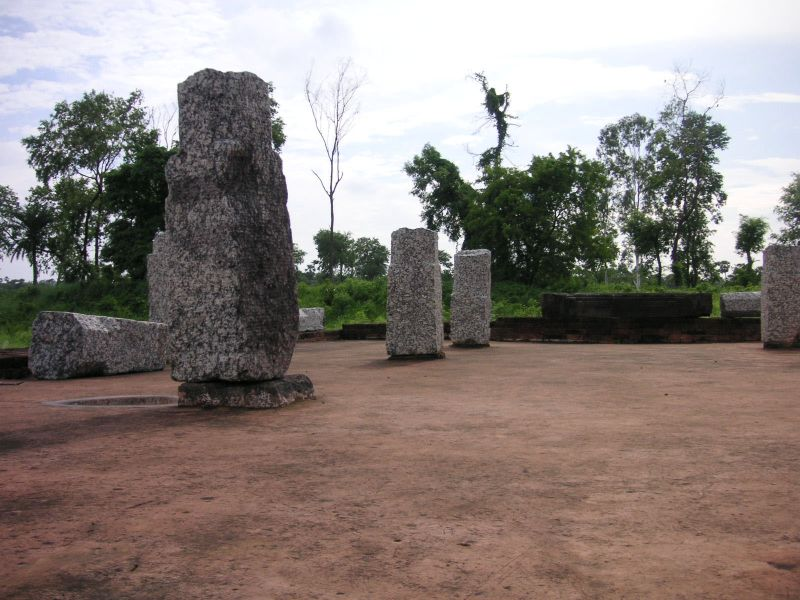
Pillars at Vikramashila University

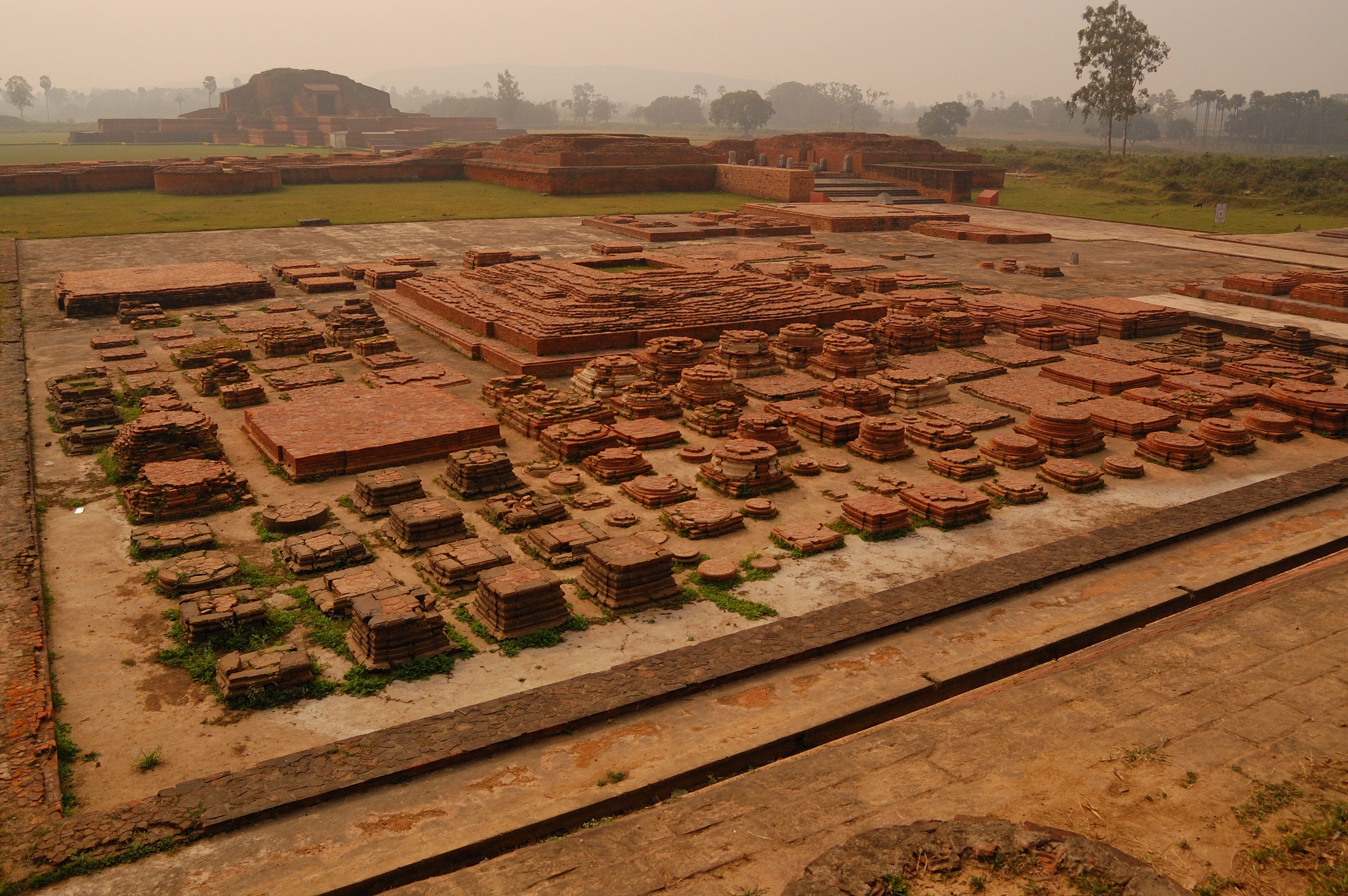
Landscape of Vikramashila Ruins, the seating and meditation area

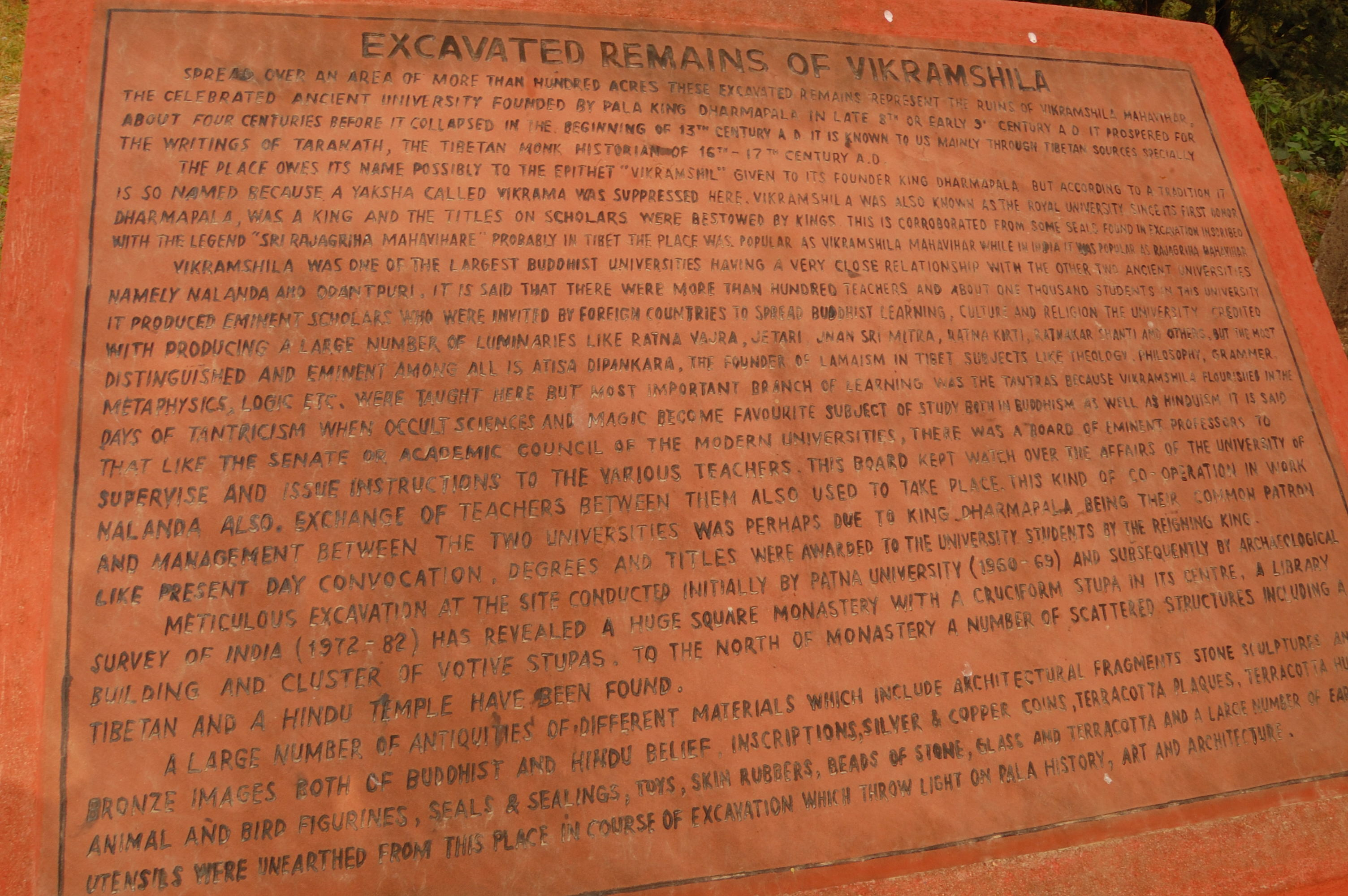
Vikramashila History on excavation location

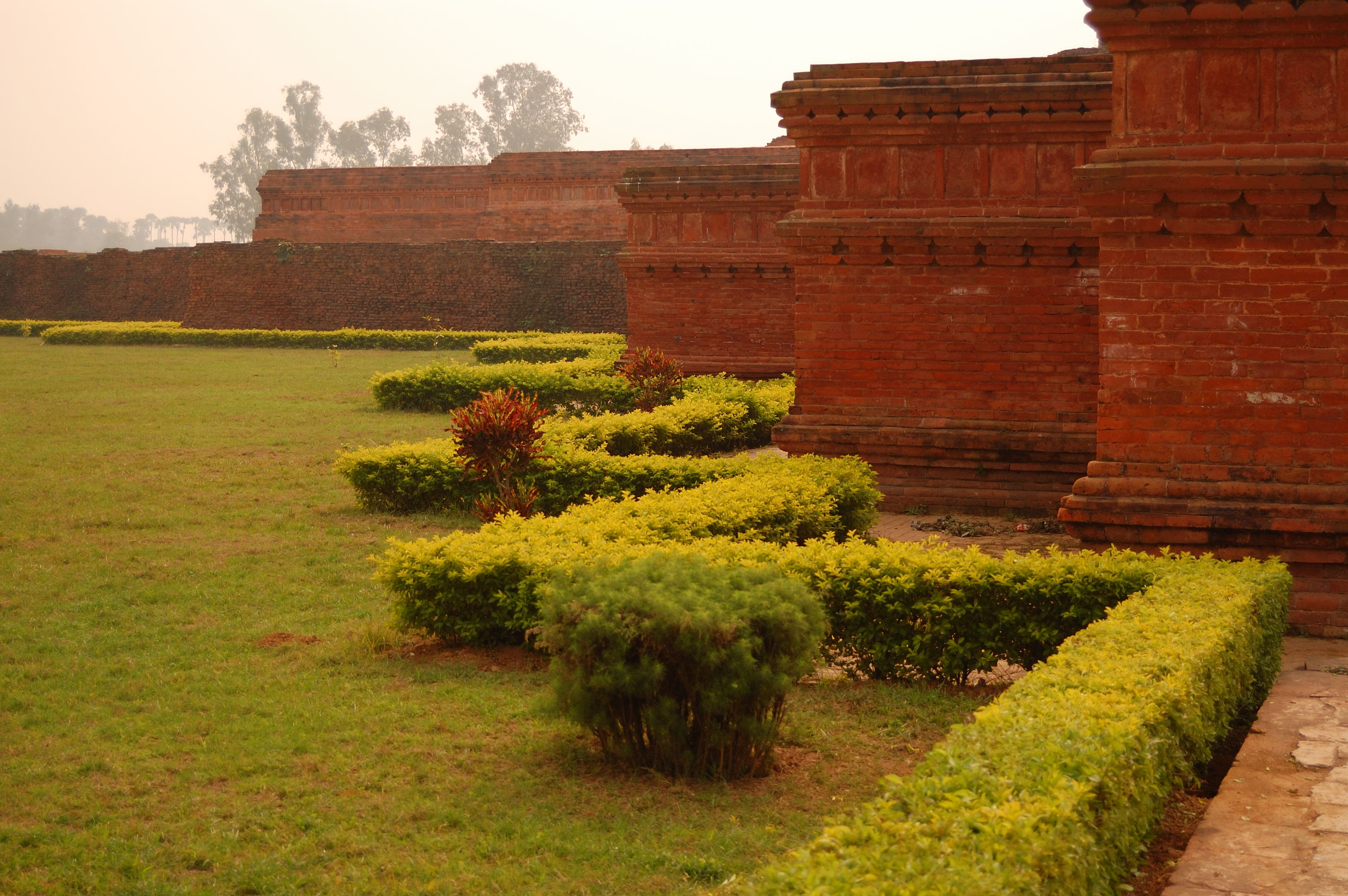
Maintenance work going on to beautify the place

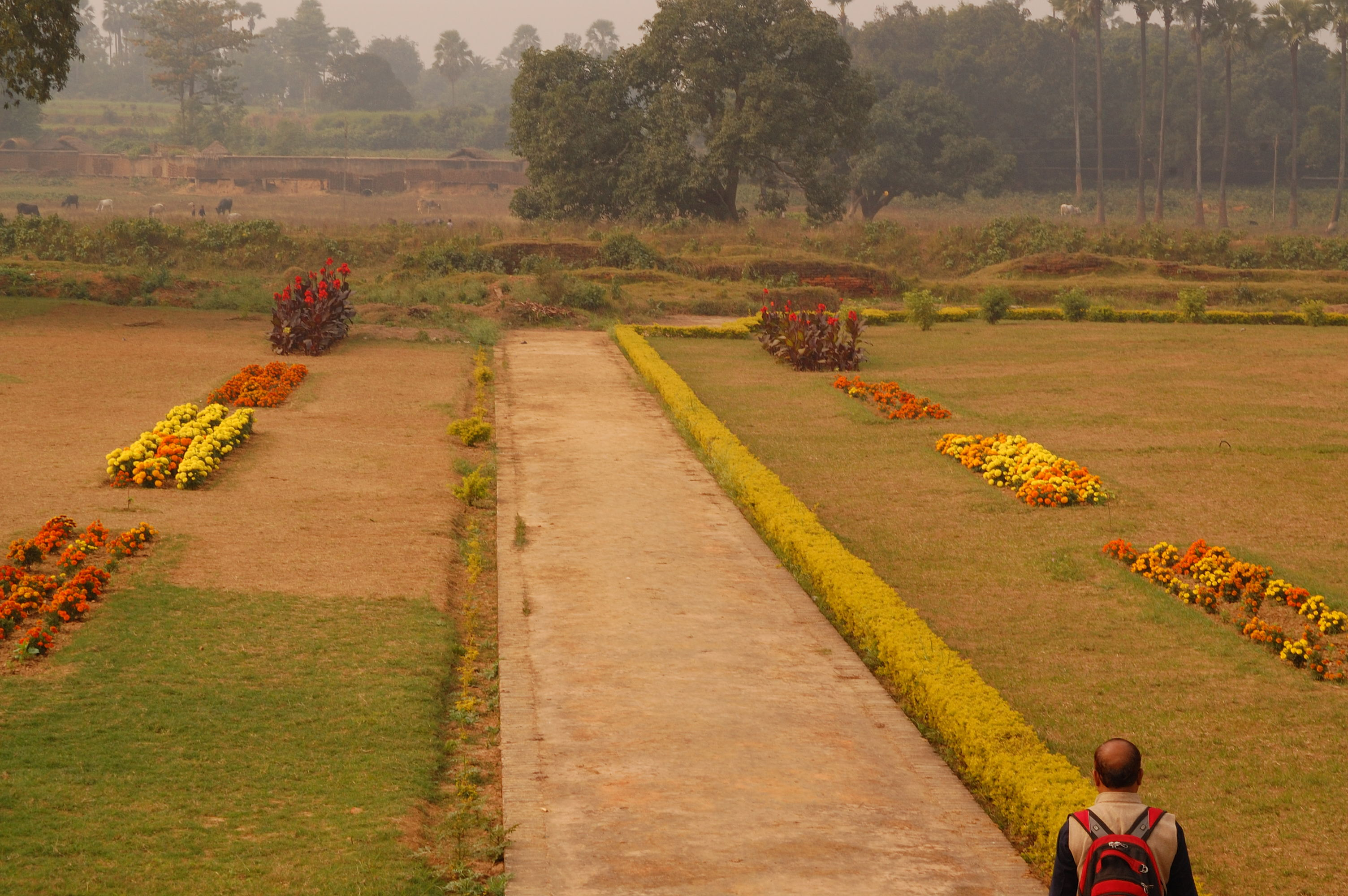
Gardens around the main stupa

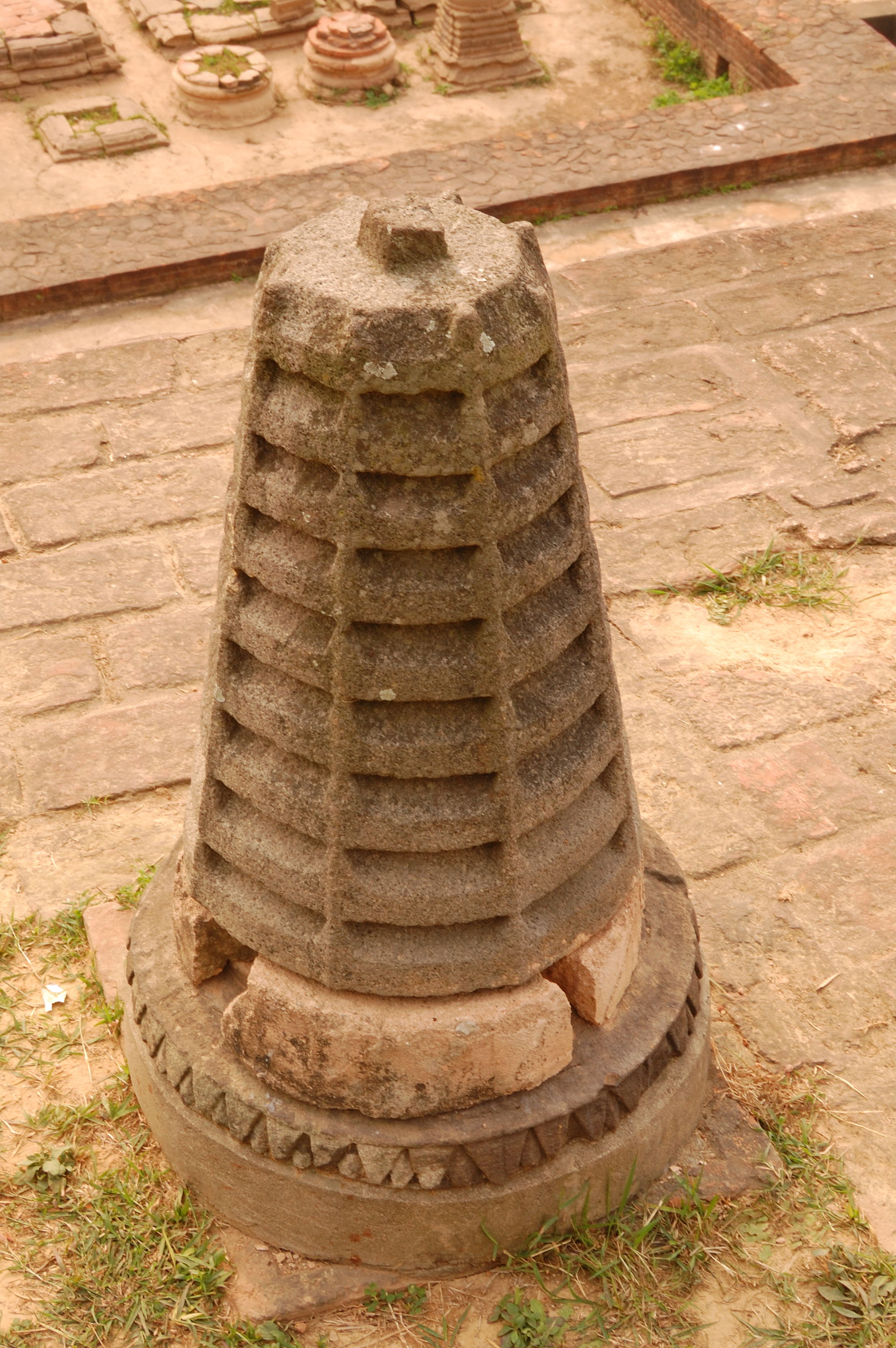
A stone structure at the ruins

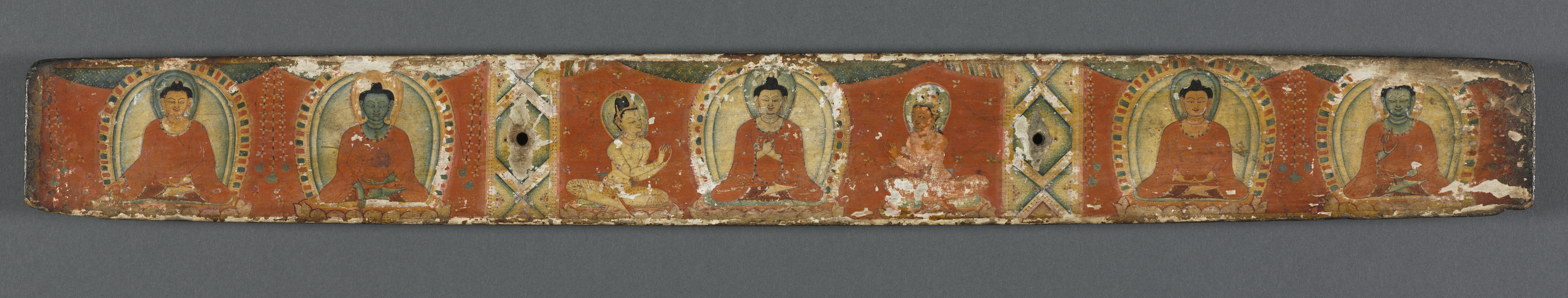
Painted manuscript of the Aṣṭasāhasrikā Prajñāpāramitā Sūtra dated to c. 1119 from Vikramashila

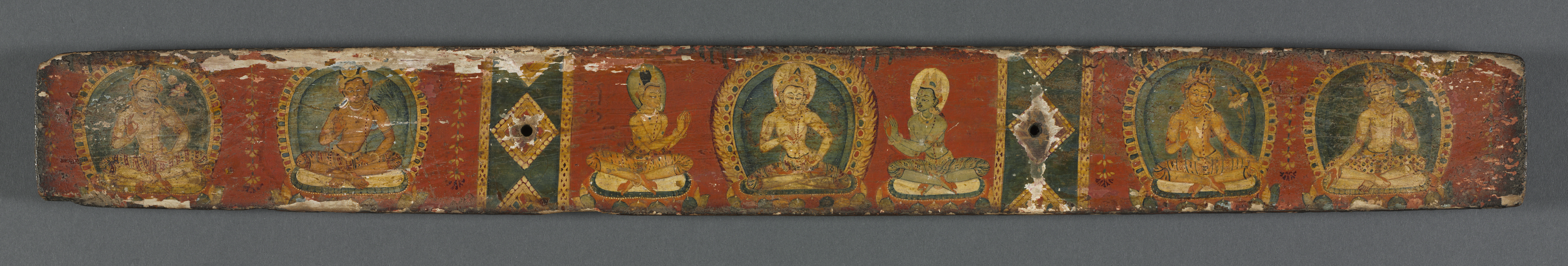
Painted manuscript of the Aṣṭasāhasrikā Prajñāpāramitā Sūtra dated to c. 1119 from Vikramashila

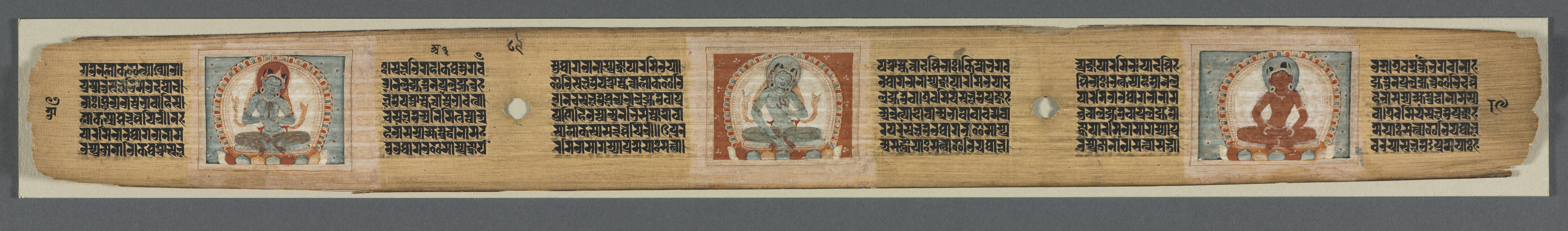
Painted manuscript of the Aṣṭasāhasrikā Prajñāpāramitā Sūtra dated to c. 1119 from Vikramashila

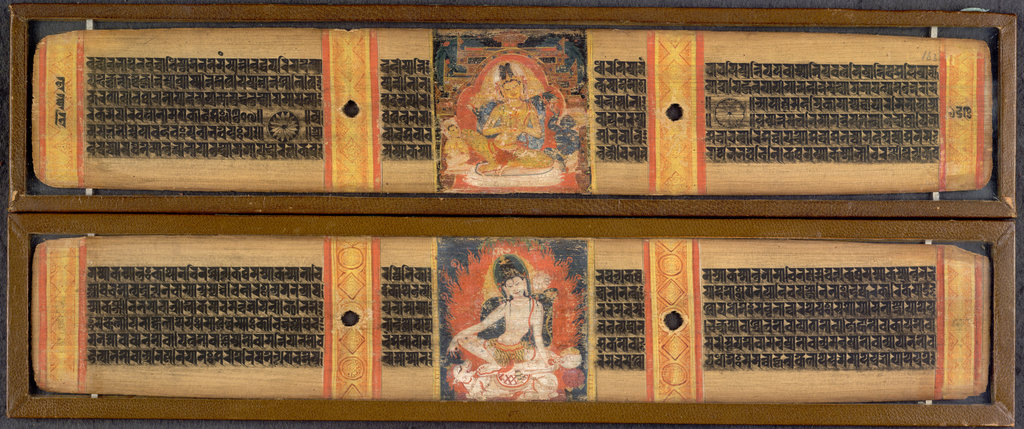
Painted manuscript depiction of Maitreya and Avalokitesvara from Vikramashila c. mid 12th century

== See also ==
- Vikramashila Central University
- Nalanda
- Odantapuri
- Pala Empire
