= Haribhadra (Buddhist philosopher) =

8th-century Indian Buddhist philosopher

Haribhadra, also known as Shizi Xian (simplified Chinese: 狮子贤; traditional Chinese: 獅子賢; pinyin: Shīzixián) or Sengge Zangpo (Tibetan: སེང་གེ་བཟང་པོ་, Wylie: seng-ge bzang-po; both names mean "righteous lion") was an 8th-century CE Buddhist philosopher and commentator. He was one of the founding monks of the Vikramashila monastery in modern-day Bihar, India and he was also the preceptor of the Pala Emperor, Dharmapala.

A notable student of his was the monk Buddhajñānapāda who also played a role in founding Vikramashila.

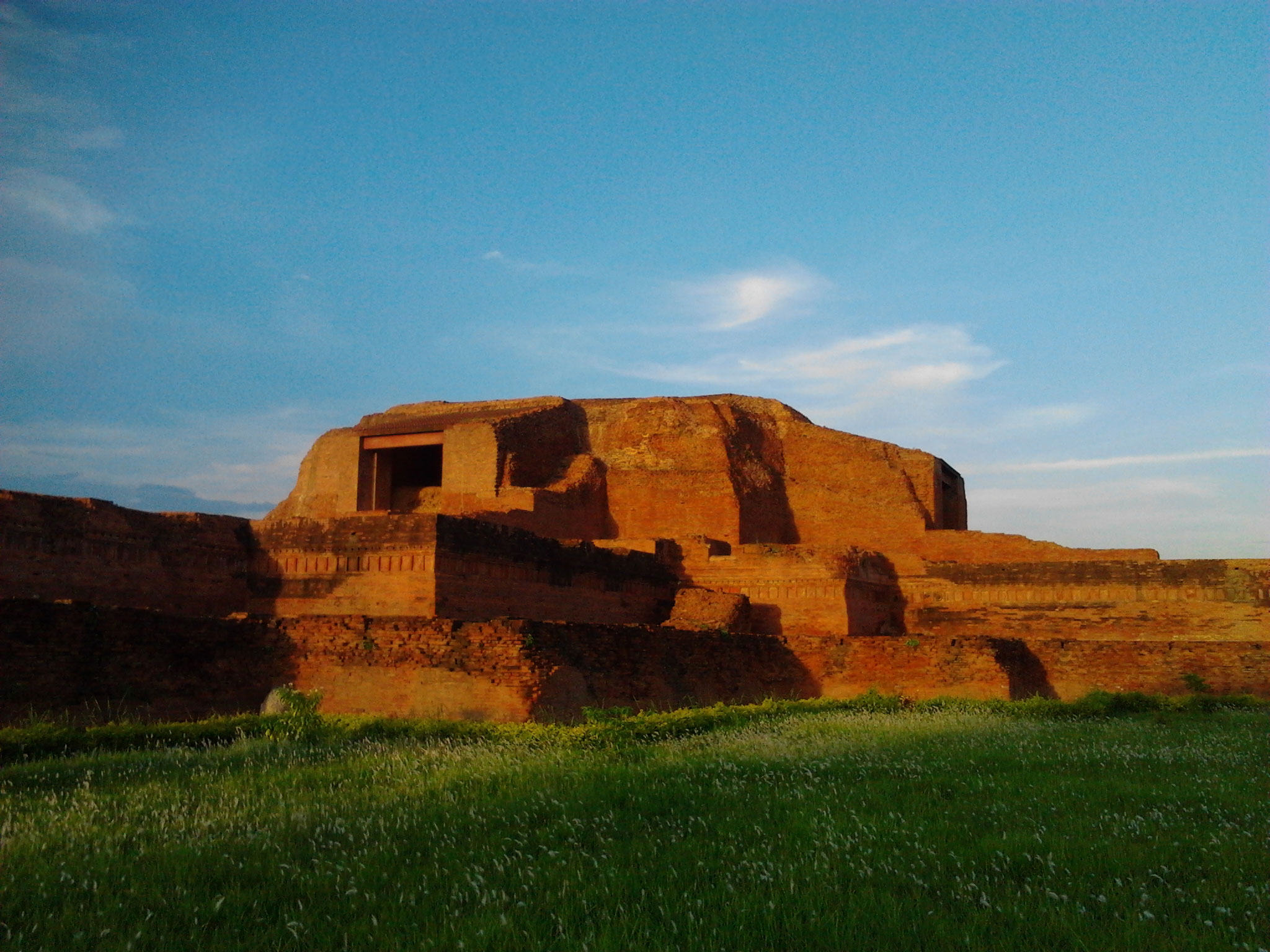
The monastery of Vikramashila of which Haribhadra was one of the founding monks

== Life ==
Details of Haribhadra's life are known both through his writings and through the writings of later Tibetan writers including Taranatha and Buton Rinchen Drub. Most scholars place Haribhadra in the second half of the 8th century and the beginning of the 9th century but Mano Laohavanich places him around 735–795 CE. What is known for certain is that he was active during the reign of Emperor Dharmapala as Taranatha noted that he died 20 years after the ascension of Dharmapala to the throne. Buton states that Haribhadra belonged to a Kshatriya family while Taranatha states that he was a prince. A story exists detailing that he received his name after his mother was attacked and killed by a lion while he was still in her womb. He survived; hence, Hari refers to the lion and Bhadra refers to being fortunate.

The colophon of the Ālokā details that he was staying at the Trikaṭuka monastery which has yet to be identified but was probably located in the northeast of India around Bihar and Bengal. Buddhism during Haribhadra's lifetime, was flourishing in the territory of the Pala Empire with new monasteries being established including Vikramashila, Odantapuri and Somapura.

Over the course of his monastic career, he garnered a reputation as a specialist in the Prajñāpāramitā.

== Works ==
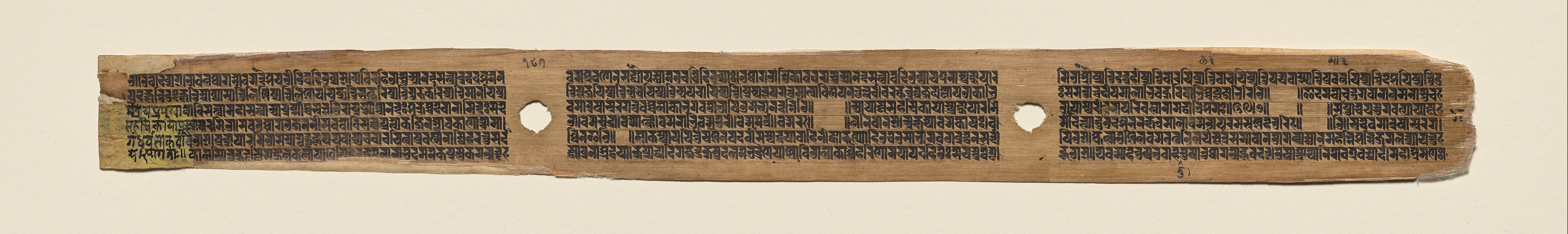
Manuscript of the Aṣṭasāhasrikā Prajñāpāramitā Sūtra. The colophon from this manuscript contains a copy of Haribhadra's final remarks in the commentary, the Ratnagunasamcaya-gatha

Haribhadra's commentary on the Abhisamayalankara was one of the most influential of the twenty-one Indian commentaries on that text, perhaps because of its author's status as Shantarakshita's student. Like his master, Haribhadra is retrospectively considered by Tibetan doxographical tradition to represent the Yogācāra-Svatantrika-Mādhyamaka school.

Haribhadra's interpretation of the Abhisamayalankara, particularly his four-kaya model, was controversial and contradicted the earlier normative interpretation popularised by Vimuktasena. Haribhadra claims, that Abhisamayalamkara chapter 8 is describing Buddhahood through four kayas: svabhavikakaya, [jnana]dharmakaya, sambhogakaya and nirmanakaya. Haribhadra's position was in turn challenged by Ratnākaraśānti and Abhayakaragupta. In Tibet the debate continued, with Je Tsongkhapa championing Haribhadra's position and Gorampa of the Sakya school promoting the other.

Unlike many of his contemporaries, Haribhadra is not associated with any popular practice of Tantra during this period. He does however reference the tantric text, Vajrapāṇyabhiṣekamahātantra, in his Ālokā.

=== Legacy ===
Haribhdra's works were popular in Tibet where he held an almost "uncontested" status. His commentaries were translated into Tibetan relatively early by the 11th century and one of these translators was Rngog Blo ldan shes rab.
