= Aṣṭasāhasrikā Prajñāpāramitā Sūtra =

Mahāyāna Buddhist sūtra (c.50 CE)

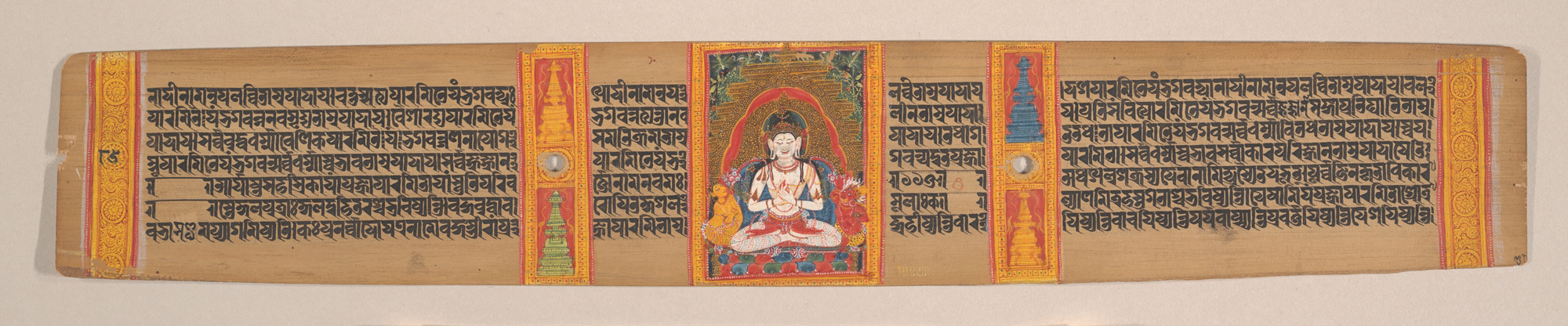
Bodhisattva Maitreya, Folio from a manuscript of the Aṣṭasāhasrikā Prajñāpāramitā commissioned by the Queen Vihunadevi of the Pala Empire and illuminated by Mahavihara Master, with "finest extant series of 12th-century paintings known". Bengal, early 12th century. Metropolitan Museum of Art

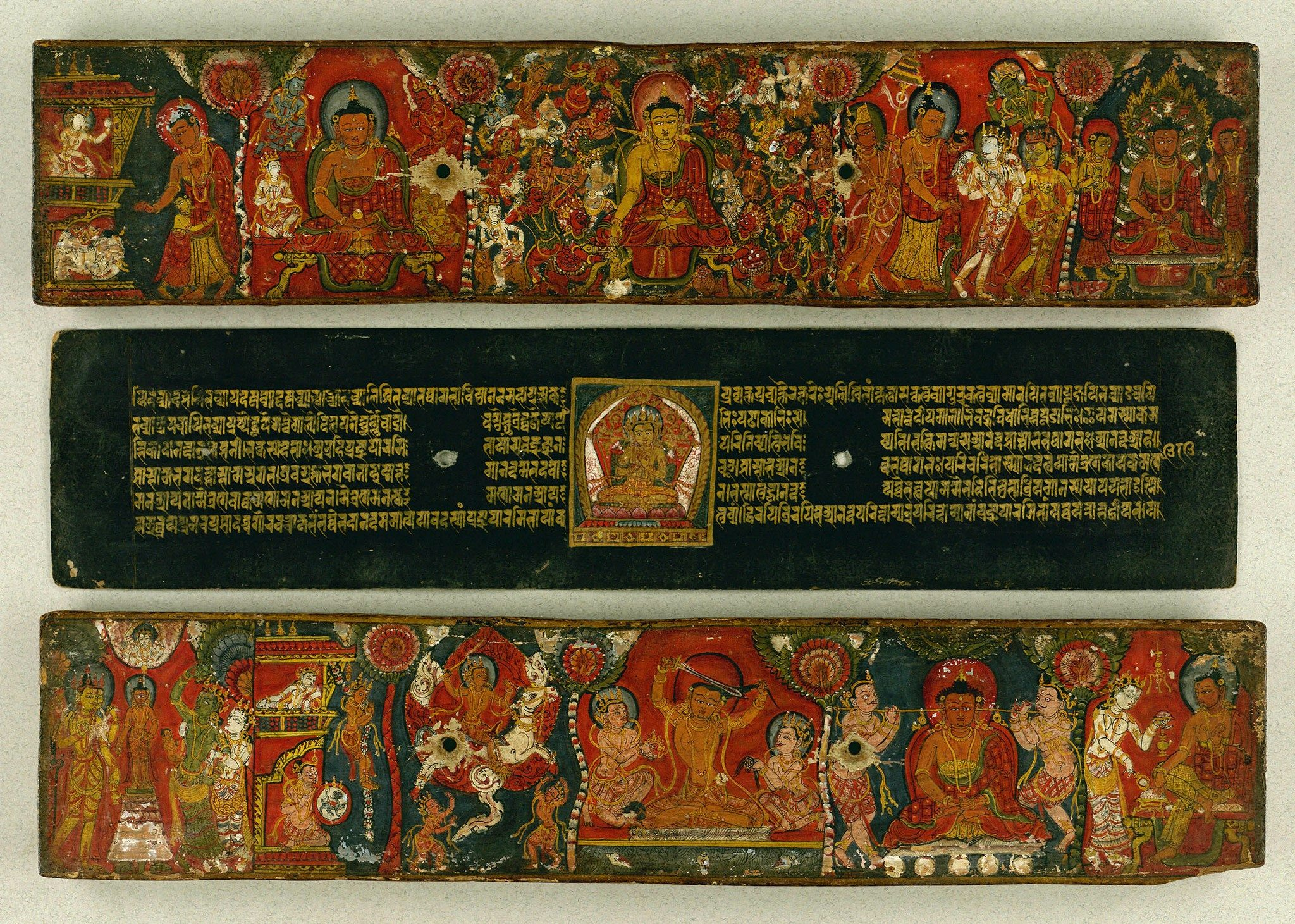
Painted covers and single folio from the Aṣṭasāhasrikā Prajñāpāramitā manuscript from Nepal, dated 1511. Royal Library, Denmark

The Aṣṭasāhasrikā Prajñāpāramitā Sūtra (Sanskrit: अष्टसाहस्रिका प्रज्ञापारमिता सूत्र, Burmese Sanskrit: အၐ္ဋသာဟသြိကာ ပြဇ္ညာပါရမိတာ သူတြ; English: The Perfection of Wisdom in Eight Thousand [Lines]) is a Mahāyāna Buddhist sūtra in the category of Prajñāpāramitā sūtra literature. The sūtra's manuscript witnesses date to at least the second half of the first century, making it among the oldest Buddhist manuscripts in existence. The sūtra forms the basis for the expansion and development of the Prajñāpāramitā sūtra literature. In terms of its influence in the development of Buddhist philosophical thought, P.L. Vaidya writes that "all Buddhist writers from Nāgārjuna, Āryadeva, Maitreyanātha, Asaṅga, Vasubandhu, Dignāga, down to Haribhadra concentrated their energies in interpreting Aṣṭasāhasrikā only," making it of great significance in the development of Madhyāmaka and Yogācāra thought.

The sūtra deals with a number of topics, but is primarily concerned with the conduct of a bodhisattva, the realisation and attainment of the Perfection of Wisdom as one of the Six Perfections, the realisation of thusness (tathātā), the attainment of irreversibility on the path to buddhahood (avaivartika), non-conceptualisation and abandonment of views, as well as the worldly and spiritual benefit of worshipping the sūtra.

== Title ==
The Sanskrit title for the sūtra, Aṣṭasāhasrikā Prajñāpāramitā Sūtram, literally translates as "The Perfection of Wisdom in Eight Thousand Sūtra." The "Eight Thousand," Edward Conze indicates, refers roughly to ślokas, which have a count of thirty two syllables. Regarding this, Conze writes, "The Cambridge manuscript Add 866 of A.D. 1008 gives the actual number of slokas after each chapter, and added together they are exactly 8,411." This title is likely late in origin, as Seishi Karashima writes regarding the text from which Lokakṣema (fl. 147–189) was translating, the text was probably originally just entitled Prajñāpāramitā or Mahāprajñāpāramitā. But when different versions began circulating, the additional titles, such as references to length, were added in order to differentiate them. The name of Lokakṣema's translation thus became Dàohéng Bānruòbōluómì Jīng, (Note: While the two characters 般 and 若 are now individually pronounced as “bān” and “ruò”, respectively, it is common in modern Chinese Buddhist idiom to pronounce them as “bō” and “rĕ”, which is usually explained as being a uniquely Buddhist form. However, the Chinese is a phoneticization of Sanskrit “prajñā”, or more likely actually some form of Gāndhārī in the very early Chinese translation, such as “praña” (FALK & KARASHIMA 2013; KARASHIMA 2013). Thus, while “bānruò” (般若) itself would most likely not exactly correspond to the ancient pronunciation of these characters, it is preferable as a transliteration to “bōrĕ”.) "The Way of Practice Perfection of Wisdom Sūtra," with the extra element "Dàohéng" taken from the name of the first chapter.

The sūtra is among the most well-established in the Mahāyāna tradition and "was the first philosophical text to be translated from the Mahāyāna literature into Chinese." It was translated seven times into Chinese, five times into Tibetan, and eight times into Mongolian. Its titles in the languages of these various countries include:

- Sanskrit: अष्टसाहस्रिकाप्रज्ञापारमितासूत्रम्, romanized: Aṣṭasāhasrikā-prajñāpāramitā-sūtram, lit. 'The Perfection of Wisdom in Eight Thousand [Lines]'
- Chinese:
  1. 道行般若波羅蜜經, Dàohéng Bānruòbōluómì Jīng, 'The Way of Practice Prajñāpāramitā Sūtra' T224 (Trans. Lokakṣema, 179 CE )
  2. 大明度經, Dàmíngdù Jīng, 'The Great Prajñāpāramitā Sūtra' T225 (Trans. Zhī Qīan & Kāng Sēnghùi, 223-229 CE)
  3. 般若鈔經, Bānruò Chāo Jīng, 'The Small Prajñā Sūtra' T226 (Trans. Dharmarakṣa, 386 CE)
  4. 小品般若波羅蜜經, Xiaŏpĭn Bānruòbōluómì Jīng, 'The Small Section Prajñāpāramitā Sūtra' T227 (Trans. Kumārajīva, 408 CE)
  5. Assembly 4 of 大般若波羅蜜多經, Dàbānruòbōluómìduō Jīng, 'The Great Prajñāpāramitā Sūtra' T220 fasc. 538–555 (Trans. Xuánzàng, 660 CE)
  6. Assembly 5 of 大般若波羅蜜多經, Dàbānruòbōluómìduō Jīng, 'The Great Prajñāpāramitā Sūtra' T220 fasc. 556–565 (Trans. Xuánzàng, 660 CE) — Both of Xuánzàng's translations are equivalent to the Aṣṭasāhasrikā with the exception of his exclusion of the Sadāprarudita story.
  7. 佛母出生三法藏般若波羅蜜多經, Fómŭ Chūshēng Sānfăzàng Bānruòbōluómìduō Jīng, 'The Three Dharma Treasuries for the Attainment of Buddhahood Prajñāpāramitā Sūtra' T228 (Trans. Dānapāla, 1004 CE)
- Japanese: 八千頌般若経 (はっせんじゅはんにゃきょう), romanized: Hassenju Hannya Kyō, lit. 'The Eight Thousand [Line] Prajñā Sūtra' This term refers to the Sanskrit source text, rather than the Chinese translations which are prevalent in Japanese Buddhist usage.
- Standard Tibetan: ཤེས་རབ་ཀྱི་ཕ་རོལ་ཏུ་ཕྱིན་པ་ བརྒྱད་སྟོང་པ་, romanized: Shes-rab-kyi pha-rol-tu phyin-pa brgyad stong-pa, lit. 'The Perfection of Wisdom in Eight Thousand Lines' (Trans. Ye-shes-sde, 9th C.)
- Mongolian: Naĭman mi͡angat Ikh Khȯlgȯn sudar orshivoĭ, lit. 'The Perfection of Wisdom in Eight Thousand Lines'

== History ==
=== Indian Developments ===
==== Traditional Theories of Formation ====
While it is held by some in the Mahāyāna tradition that the Buddha taught the Aṣṭasāhasrikā, and the other Mahāyāna sūtras during his lifetime, some legends exist regarding its appearance in the world after the Buddha's parinirvāṇa. One such legend is that Mañjuśrī Bodhisattva came to the house of King Candragupta (321–297 BCE), preached, and left the Aṣṭasāhasrikā there. Another, related by Haribhadra (8th C), is that while the Śrāvakayāna teachings were entrusted and preserved by Ānanda, the Mahāyāna sūtras, and in particular the "Prajñāpāramitā Sūtra," were entrusted to Vajradhāra residing in the Aḍakavatī Heaven. Finally, the legend which has the most currency in East Asia, is that Nāgārjuna was gifted the sūtra from the king of the nāgas after seeing Nāgārjuna's resolve to obtain the Mahāyāna sūtras of the Buddha that were missing on earth.

It is clear that Indian monastics did not see the development of the Prajñāpāramitā literature in the first millennium as an outgrowth from the Aṣṭasāhasrikā, an early opinion, but Dignāga (c. 480–540 CE), suggests "we assert that this Eight Thousand is a condensed version [of the Perfection of Wisdom] text, not short of any of the topics. It proclaims the very same topics that the longer sūtras] have proclaimed." Later, Haribhadra suggests that the Buddha "demonstrated the [Śatasāhasrikā] to bring benefit to those beings who are devoted to words and delight in extensively worked-out rendition, demonstrated the [Pañcaviṃśatisāhasrikā], through gathering all the topics together, out of affection for those beings who delight in middle-sized [renditions] and understand from selective elaboration, and taught the [Aṣṭasāhasrikā], through condensing its topics, to produce benefit for beings who are captured by headings and delight in brief explanation." Haribhadra, however, uses the topics of the Pañcaviṃśatisāhasrikā, which were the basis of the Abhisamayālaṅkāra of Asaṅga (4th C) on which his commentary relies, in order to explain the Aṣṭasāhasrikā.

Chinese monastics in general also held that the translations corresponding to the Aṣṭasāhasrikā were redacted from the medium sūtras (e.g. translations of the Pañcaviṃśatisāhasrikā)—despite the fact that large portions of the shorter versions of the sūtra are absent from the larger texts. For instance, Dao’an (312-385 CE) theorised that Indian monks redacted the Dàohéng translation from the longer sūtras, but also that the longer sūtras could be used as commentaries on the Dàohéng. Similarly, Zhi Daolin (314-366 CE) suggested that monks had redacted the Xiăopĭn translation from the medium sūtra.

==== Contemporary Theories on Formation ====
Contemporary scholarship holds that the shorter Prajñāpāramitā sūtras, using the Aṣṭasāhasrikā as the base, were redacted and expanded in the formation of the longer sūtras. As Jan Nattier characterises,

the evolution of the Aṣṭasāhasrikā-Prajñāpāramitā into the Pañcaviṃsati-sāhasrikā through what we might call the “club sandwich” style of textual formation: with the exception of the final chapters (30-32 in the Sanskrit version) of the Aṣṭa-, which have no counterpart in the Sanskrit Pañca- and apparently circulated separately before being incorporated into the Aṣṭa- ... the [Pañca-] consists of the Aṣṭa- being “sliced” like a loaf of bread and then layered with “fillings” introduced from other sources. Very little of the text of the Aṣṭa- has been altered in the process, and only rarely does a crumb of the “bread” seem to have dropped out. The Pañca- is not simply related to the Aṣṭa-; it is the Aṣṭa-, with the addition of a number of layers of new material.

Similarly, Edward Conze suggested a nine-stage model of expansion. (1) A base urtext of the Ratnagunasaṃcaya Gāthā, starting with the first two chapters. (2) Chapters 3 to 28 of the Ratnagunasaṃcaya were added, which were then put into prose as the Aṣṭasāhasrikā. To this were gradually added (3) material from the Abhidharma, (4) concessions to the "Buddhism of Faith" (referring to Pure Land references in the sūtra), and then (5) the expansion into the larger sūtras, their (6) contraction into the shorter sūtras (i.e. Diamond Sūtra, Heart Sūtra, down to the Prajñāpāramitā in One Letter), which all in turn set the basis for the (7) Yogācārin commentaries and (8) Tantras and (9) Chan.

Based on a similar understanding, most scholars of the Prajñāpāramitā have suggested that there is a base urtext from which the rest of the Aṣṭasāhasrikā expanded. Similar to Conze in regards to the Ratnagunasaṃcaya, scholars who hold that the first chapter of the prose sūtra is the urtext include Kōun Kajiyoshi, Yinshun, and Lambert Schmithausen. Ryūshō Hikata argued that the sūtra was composed in two phases from Chapter 1 to 25, but that material from Chapter 26 to 32 and references to Akṣobhya were later developments. P.L. Vaidya is alone in suggesting that the urtext is "Dharmodgata's sermon to Sadāprarudita" at Chapter 31.

Matthew Orsborn presents a dissenting opinion to the urtext theories, holding that the presence of chiastic structures may point "to the entire sūtra being composed as a single and unified whole as it presently stands (more or less)," with additional materials being added around these chiastically arranged materials.

==== Commentarial Tradition ====
The primary subject of Prajñāpāramitā commentary has been the Pañcaviṃśatisāhasrikā version. This includes the commentaries attributed to Nāgārjuna, Dignāga, and Asaṅga's Abhisamayālaṅkāra. Using the Abhisamayālaṅkāra as a basis, however, Haribhadra composed a commentary on the Aṣṭasāhasrikā, the Abhisamayālaṅkārāloka, or the "Light for the Ornament of Clear Realisation." While, owing to it being based on a commentary on a different text, the structure suggested to be present by Haribhadra does not fit perfectly, the structure as he understands it is as follows:

1. The Three Knowledges
  1. Knowledge of all Aspects Chapter 1
  2. Knowledge of all Paths Chapters 2-7
  3. All-Knowledge Chapter 8
2. The Four Practices
  1. Full Awakening to All Aspects Chapters 9-19
  2. Culmination Realisation Chapters 20-28
  3. Serial Realisation Chapter 29
  4. Instant Realisation Chapter 29
3. The Dharma Body
  1. Full Awakening to the Dharma Body Chapters 30-32

==== Manuscripts and Editions ====
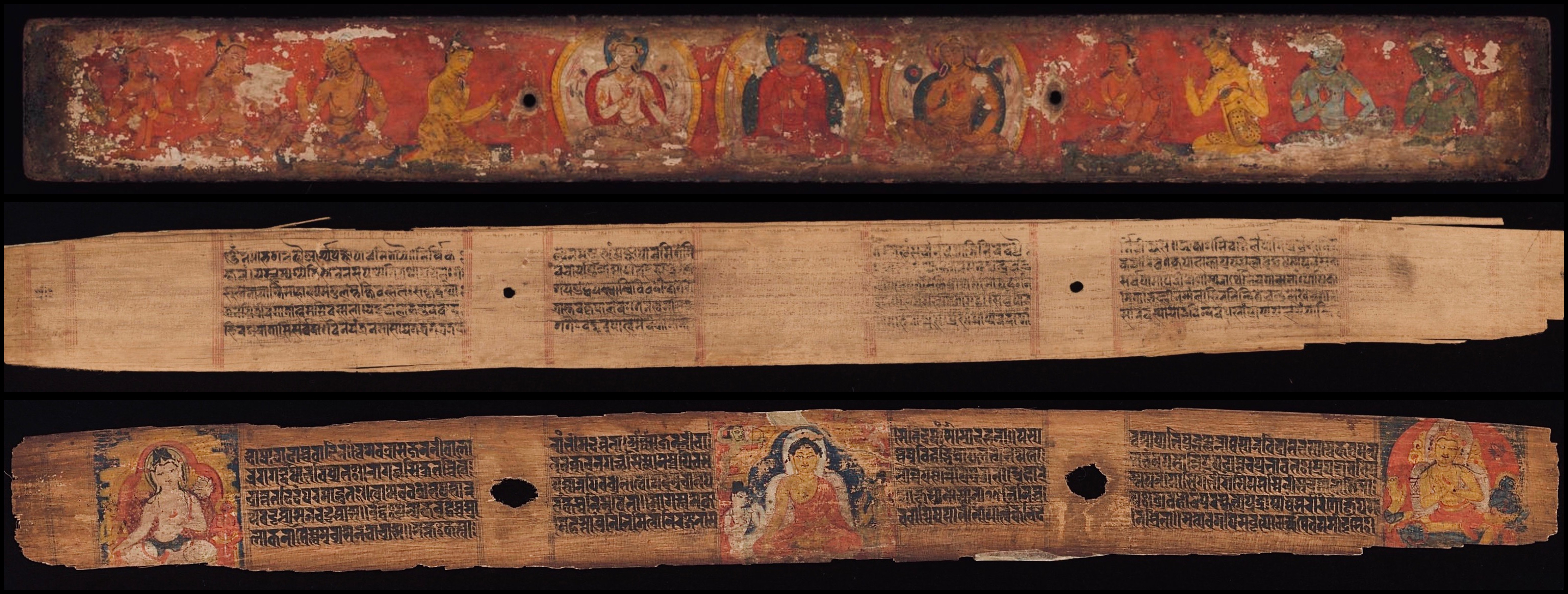
Wooden cover and two leaves from the manuscript of the Aṣṭasāhasrikā Prajñāpāramitā made in Bengal c. 985. Cambridge University Library

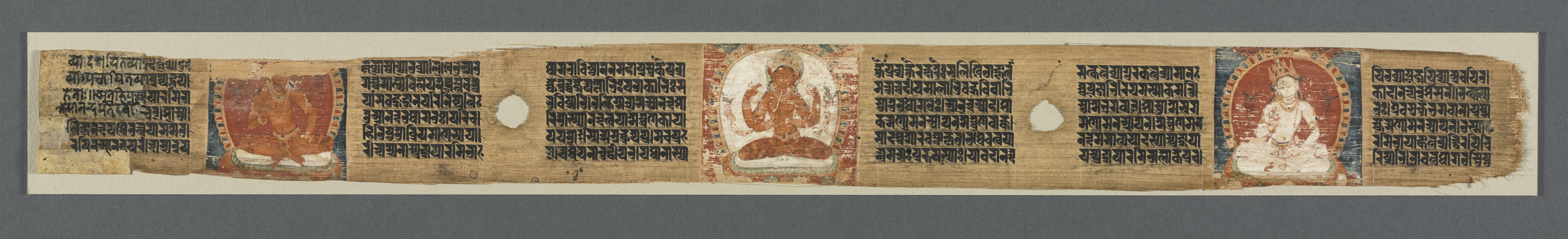
Aṣṭasāhasrikā manuscript. Cleveland Museum of Art.

The following is a chronological survey of prominent manuscript witnesses and editions of the Sanskrit Aṣṭasāhasrikā text:

- second half of the first century — Kharoṣṭhī manuscript from the Split Collection. This is in the Gāndhārī language and was composed in Gandhāra.
- c. 200 CE — Fragments in late Kuṣāṇa Brāhmī from the Schøyen collection. This manuscript is in Sanskrit but was probably also composed in Gandhāra.
- 985 CE — Cambridge MS Add. 1464. Composed in Bengal (see illustration)
- c. 1000 CE — Cambridge MS Add. 1163. Composed in Nepal.
- 1008 CE — Cambridge MS Add. 866. Composed in Nepal.
- 1015 CE — Cambridge MS Add. 1643. Composed in Kathmandu, Nepal.
- 1264 CE — Cambridge MS Add. 1465. Composed in Nepal.
- Three other Cambridge manuscripts exist.
- The Nepalese-German Manuscript Cataloguing Project lists 97 Aṣṭasāhasrikā manuscripts in archives.

The following editions have been made of the Sanskrit text:

- 1888 — ed. Rajendra Lal Mitra. This edition is in Devanāgarī and was prepared using:
  - a Bengali transcript of a 19th-century Nepalese original
  - a Nepalese manuscript provided by Brian Houghton Hodgson dating to 1061
  - a Nālandā manuscript from the Royal Asiatic Society of Great Britain dating to 12th century
  - a Nālandā manuscript from the Asiatic Society of Bengal dating to 1097
  - Two manuscripts from Nepal, which Mitra judged to be older than the previous manuscript
  - a 12th-century manuscript of Nepalese origin
- 1932-5 — ed. Unrai Wogihara. This edition corrects many of Mitra's errata, and also features the running commentary of Haribhadra using manuscripts of the Abhisamayālaṅkārāloka loaned from Sylvain Lévi and the Calcutta Library.
- 1960 — ed. Paraśurāma Lakṣmaṇa Vaidya. This edition is based on Wogihara and Mitra, and attempts to correct perceived errors in sandhi.

=== Translations into Western Languages ===
The Aṣṭasāhasrikā first became known to western scholars when Brian Hodgson had obtained manuscripts of the sūtra in Nepal and sent them to the Indologist Eugène Burnouf (1801–1852) in Paris for analysis. Burnouf's first impression was lack of interest, "because I saw only perpetual repetitions of the advantages and merits promised to those who obtain prajñāpāramitā. But what is this prajñā itself? This is what I did not see anywhere, and what I wished to learn."CITEREFBurnoufBuffetrilleLopez_Jr. Later, in his 1844 work on the history of Indian Buddhism, Burnouf presented the first detailed study of the doctrines of the Prajñāpāramitā found in the west. In that work, he also produced a translation of the first chapter and stated "I have translated, for my personal use, almost all of the Prajñā in eight thousand articles".CITEREFBurnoufBuffetrilleLopez_Jr. This French translation was published in 2022 by Guillaume Ducoeur.

The only full published translation remains Edward Conze's 1973 translation, The Perfection of Wisdom in Eight Thousand Lines and its Verse Summary. A translation of the first two chapters of Kumārajīva's version was published by Matt Orsborn (a.k.a.Shi Huifeng) in 2018.

== Outline ==
The structure of the sūtra can be understood in a number of ways. But four clear divisions can be noted:

1. Chapters 1–2: These chapters, besides setting the stage and introducing the themes of the sūtra by defining bodhisattvas and mahāsattvas, are also considered to be the urtext by a number of scholars.
2. Chapters 3–16: These chapters, according to Orsborn, expand upon the theme of the bodhisattvas' approach to understanding the Prajñāpāramitā and the benefits of the sūtra, and culminate in the bodhisattva's realisation of tathatā. This marks Chapter 16 as the central turning point in the sūtra and the centre of its chiastic structure.
3. Chapters 17–29: These chapters continue to expand upon the same themes, but this time the subject as bodhisattva is characterised as irreversible on the path to buddhahood. The approach to the Prajñāpāramitā in this half can be understood as that of one who has realised tathatā.
4. Chapters 30–32: These chapters mark a distinct break, in that they relate the past example of the bodhisattva Sadāprarudita who seeks the Prajñāpāramitā from the teacher Dharmodgata. The sūtra is concluded with an entrustment to Ānanda.

=== Chapters 1-2: Introduction ===
Chapter 1: The Practice of the Knowledge of all Modes — While at Vulture Peak, the Buddha asks Subhūti to explain how bodhisattvas realise the Prajñāpāramitā. Subhūti explains that when disciples of the Buddha who realise dharmatā teach, that is the work of the Buddha. He goes on to clarify the realisation of the Perfection of Wisdom by explaining that by cutting off the view of the inherent existence of self and phenomena, a bodhisattva can go forth on the Mahāyāna for the liberation of beings and not enter nirvāṇa halfway. However, in suchness, he points out, there are in fact no bodhisattvas, beings to save, Prajñāpāramitā, path, or nirvāṇa.

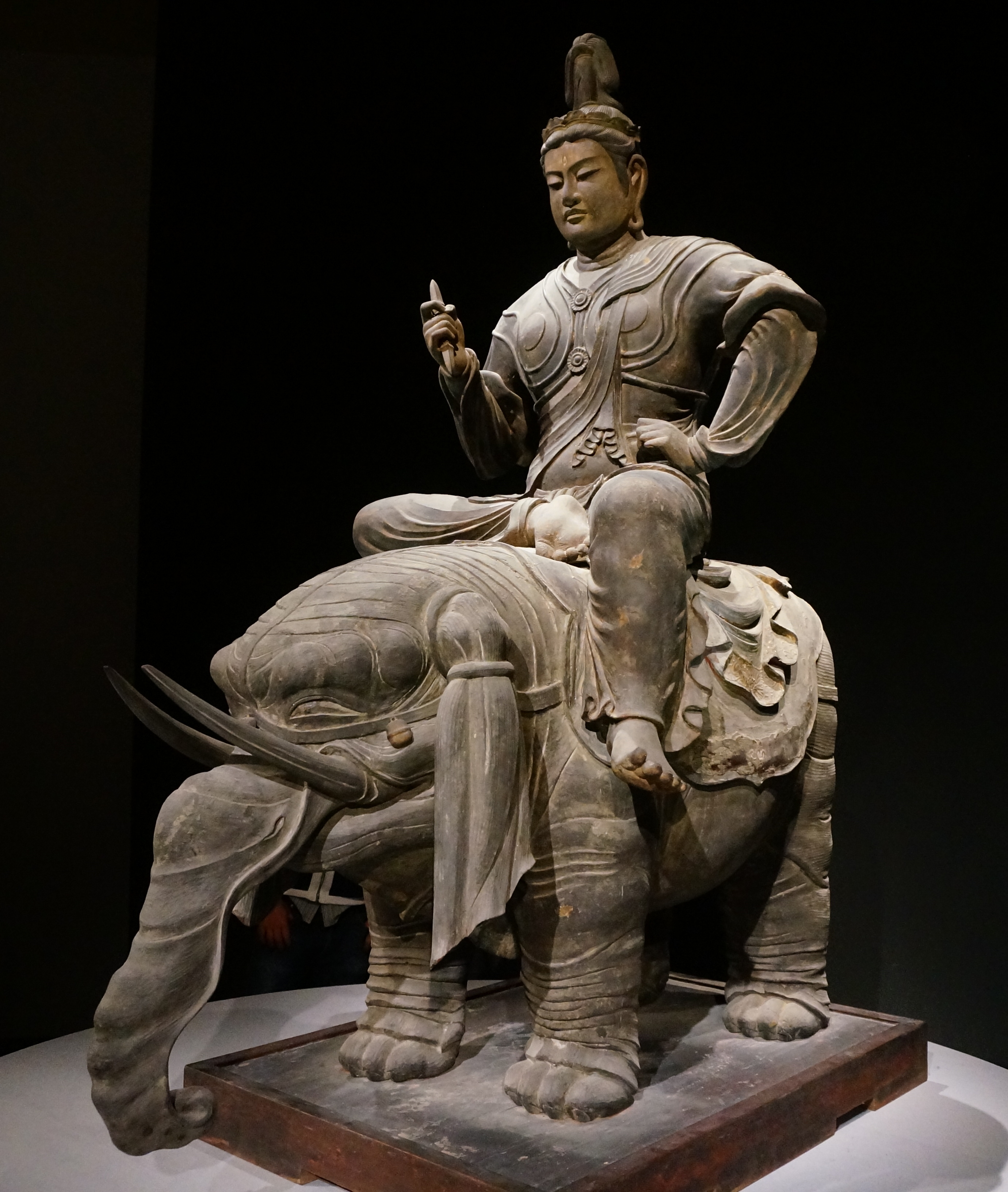
Śakra.

Chapter 2: Śakra — In response to Śakra's request for further explanation, Subhūti points out that in suchness one cannot rely on any aggregate, state of being, or the path, all of which are illusions. All, including the Prajñāpāramitā, are said to be without beginning, middle, or end, and therefore are infinite. The devas declare that they will highly regard a bodhisattva who practices as Subhūti describes—the Buddha relates how he was such a bodhisattva in the past when he met Dīpankara Buddha.

=== Chapters 3-16: The Bodhisattva's Training in the Prajñāpāramitā ===
Chapter 3. Reverence for the Receptacle of the Perfections, which holds Immeasurable Good Qualities — This chapter emphasises the worldly benefits of practicing the Prajñāpāramitā and writing it as a book and worshipping it. The devas also declare that they will come and gather around one who does this. This chapter also points out that the Prajñāpāramitā is the root of the other of the Six Pāramitās. Worshipping the Prajñāpāramitā as a book is said to be superior to worshipping stūpas because it is the source of buddhas themselves.

Chapter 4. The Proclamation of Qualities — Śakra points out that the Prajñāpāramitā is the source of all buddhas, thus in worshipping buddha relics one is really worshipping the Prajñāpāramitā. Prajñāpāramitā, also, ultimately contains the other five pāramitās—so practicing it allows one to practice the others.

Chapter 5. The Revolution of Merit — Practicing the Prajñāpāramitā is said to be of great merit, but teaching it to others is said to be even greater. However, if it is taught in the form of annihilationist doctrine, it is called the "counterfeit Prajñāpāramitā." Finally, it is declared to be the greatest gift since it renders full buddhahood.

Chapter 6. Dedication and jubilation — The chapter points out that one should rejoice in the merit of others and one's own practice and dedicate it to attaining buddhahood, but without perceiving any sign in doing so.

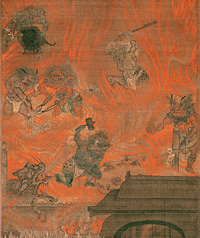
Naraka: Buddhist hell

Chapter 7. Hell — While the Prajñāpāramitā should be considered the teacher, it is not to be thought of as procuring anything and should be practiced through non-practice: this leads beings to nirvāṇa but does not result in perceiving beings or nirvāṇa. If one obtains the sūtra, it is said to be because one encountered the buddhas previously, but that it is understood depending upon one's conditions. If, however, one rejects the Prajñāpāramitā, hell is said to be the retribution.

Chapter 8. Purity – This chapter points out that ultimately the skandhas are pure, and so is the Prajñāpāramitā. Seeing this one is non-attached, but not seeing it, one develops attachment. Teaching and not teaching the Prajñāpāramitā and the skandhas is said to have no effect upon their increase or decrease, since they are ultimately like space. The Buddha points out that just as he teaches, so did all past buddhas, and so will Maitreya in the future.

Chapter 9. Praise — The Prajñāpāramitā is declared to be just a name which is not produced, stopped, defiled, or pure. Beings who hear it will be free from suffering, but some people will be hostile to its spread. Nonetheless, it is said to be pure and neither proceeds nor recedes due to its unproduced and isolated nature.

Chapter 10. Proclamation of the Qualities of Bearing in Mind — This chapter emphasises how people who practice the Prajñāpāramitā have planted karmic roots with past buddhas. If one encounters it and is not afraid, one is said to be near to realising the Prajñāpāramitā, and one develops one's practice in this regard by not mentally constructing the path. While Māra will try to obstruct such bodhisattvas, they will be sustained by the buddhas. It is said that the sūtra will spread long after the Buddha's nirvāṇa and that those who search for it will find it in one to two lives.

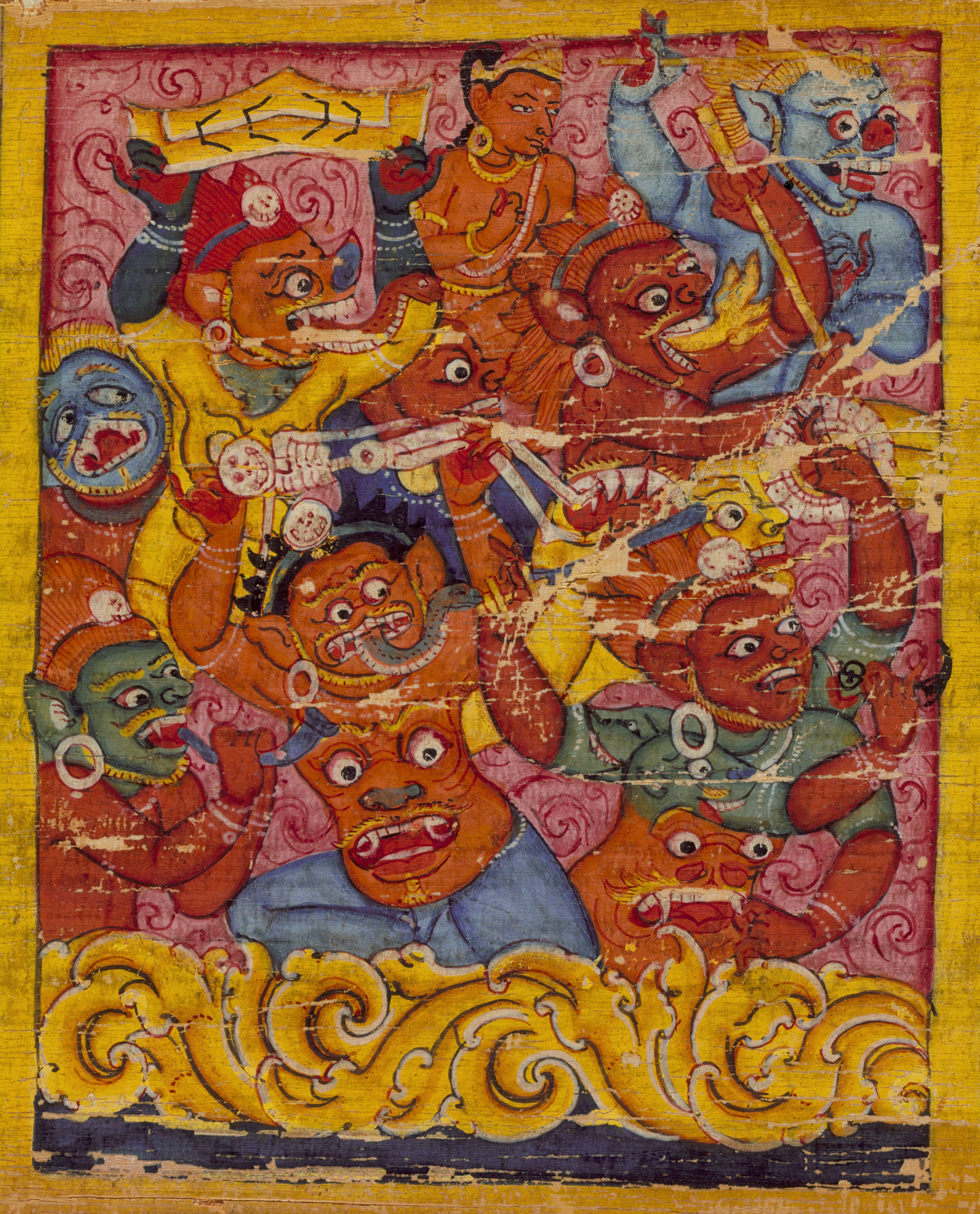
Depictions of Māra's demons from an Aṣṭasāhasrikā manuscript.

Chapter 11. Māra's Deeds — This chapter returns to the topic of Māra by pointing out how he will try to dissuade bodhisattvas from the Prajñāpāramitā. He does this in particular by making bodhisattvas slothful, creating obstacles between the student and his teacher, making them feel like the Śrāvakayāna sūtras are of greater value, and manifesting as people, such as an illusory buddha, who will give rise to doubts through misleading teachings.

Chapter 12. Showing the World — This chapter emphasises how the Prajñāpāramitā is the mother of the buddhas: therefore they care for her, just as a child for his mother, by teaching the Prajñāpāramitā. The world to which it is taught is declared to be made up of empty skandhas, and thus the world, too, is said to be empty. Similarly all beings' thoughts are characterised by emptiness, are identical to suchness, and are inherently pure. One cannot fix onto any phenomenon, just like space, and are ultimately unknowable—viewing them thus through non-viewing is said to be viewing the world.

Chapter 13. Unthinkable — The Prajñāpāramitā is said to be unthinkable and incalculable like space. The same is so of all skandhas, phenomena, attainments. All of the levels of the path are said to work through the agency of the Prajñāpāramitā as a minister does a king's work. The Prajñāpāramitā is summarised as being the non-attachment to any phenomena. It is said to be heard due to one's karmic roots, and accepting it is said to accelerate one's progress on the path.

Chapter 14. Similes — This chapter points out that practitioners of the Prajñāpāramitā may have been born in a buddha-field in a previous life, but that generally they will be born as humans. If one fails to understand the Prajñāpāramitā, it may have been due to failing to question buddhas about it in the past. Moreover, the chapter suggests that if a bodhisattva does not rely upon the Prajñāpāramitā and skilful means, they may backslide to the śrāvakayāna or pratyekabuddhayāna.

Chapter 15. Gods — This chapter suggests that bodhisattva training relies upon good friends who point out the Prajñāpāramitā. These are equated to bodhisattvas who abide in signless suchness, and who do not tremble in encountering the Prajñāpāramitā. It suggests that the bodhisattva aspiration is not related to phenomena, and that the non-grasping nature of the Dharma is demonstrated through non-demonstration.

Chapter 16. Suchness — This chapter, being the turning point in terms of identifying the end of retrogression in the realisation of suchness, emphasises that the Buddha, suchness, and phenomena are identical and non-dual—to know this is said to be buddhahood. Those who have backslided, as suggested in Chapter 14, must rely upon the Prajñāpāramitā in order to once again enter the buddhayāna. In that regard, the difficulty of buddhahood is said to be that there is no one to attain it, and no three yānas by which to approach it—awakening is knowing this without trembling.

=== Chapters 17-29: The Irreversible Bodhisattva's Training in the Prajñāpāramitaa ===
Chapter 17. Attributes, Tokens, and Signs of Irreversibility — Having attained irreversibility, a bodhisattva has no doubt of his irreversibility. Without doubt, their conduct is pure and continue to work for beings' benefit. They cannot be dissuaded by Māra, who will be easily recognised by them.

Chapter 18. Emptiness — Bodhisattva stages are equated with suchness. Reflecting upon them, a bodhisattva develops the Prajñāpāramitā. The greatest of deeds is excelled by practicing the Prajñāpāramitā for even a single day. Awakening never increases or decreases to such a bodhisattva, whose activities and merits are said to be ineffable.

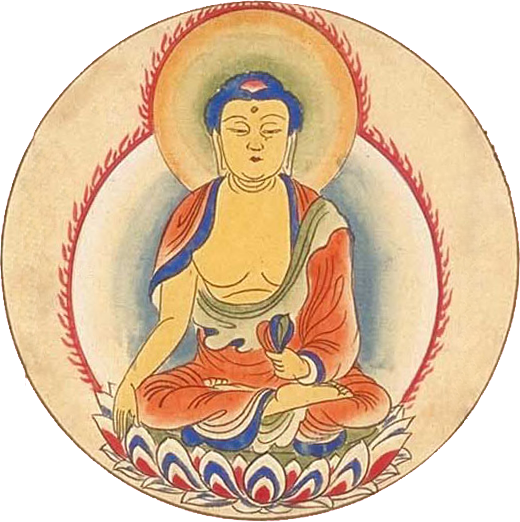
Akṣobhya Buddha

Chapter 19. The Goddess of the Ganges — Awakening is said to arise depending upon the first and last bodhicitta aspiration, but not directly by either. In suchness, development to awakening is said to only be a convention. Objective bases are said to be that upon which discriminative actions depend, but they are said to be empty. Moreover, conditionality is said to only exist by convention of speech, but not in reality. Practicing thus without fear, a bodhisattva should endure misfortunes and dedicate them to awakening.

The Goddess of the Ganges gains faith in the Prajñāpāramitā and it is predicted that after she studies under the Buddha Akṣobhya, she will become a Buddha called Suvarṇapuṣpa.

Chapter 20. Discussion of Skill in Means — This chapter describes how a bodhisattva can engage in skilful means by remaining in the world and not entering nirvāṇa in order to benefit beings. They do this by holding back from realising the reality-limit. They continue by developing the pāramitās and engaging in non-attachment. They can know their own irreversibility when they see signs in their dreams, and develop powers.

Chapter 21. Māra's Deeds — Returning to the topic of Māra, this chapter points out how Māra may give rise to conceit in bodhisattvas by making them mistakenly think they attained powers, or implanting false memories of past lives as monks, or predictions to buddhahood. Becoming conceited, the bodhisattvas will renounce the Prajñāpāramitā and return to the śrāvakayāna or pratyekabuddhayāna. Similarly, bodhisattvas living in isolation are said to be particularly targeted by Māra, who will give rise to their arrogance against city-dwelling bodhisattvas. It is emphasised that these can be counteracted by honouring the good friends.

Chapter 22. The Good Friends — The true good friends are declared to be the Six Pāramitās, with Prajñāpāramitā as their key. Relying upon it, a bodhisattva sees all as empty and pure. Thus, the Prajñāpāramitā is equated to a precious jewel. Also, in this way, beings and the Prajñāpāramitā are said to neither increase or decrease, and by not practicing in anything one practices in the Prajñāpāramitā.

Chapter 23. Śakra — It is said that by practicing and teaching the Prajñāpāramitā, all devas are surpassed by a bodhisattva. The devas will therefore protect that bodhisattva—but they can only accomplish this through the Buddha's power.

Chapter 24. Conceit — If, however, a bodhisattva does not practice the Prajñāpāramitā properly, they will be open to Māra who will give rise to their conceit. However, by practicing repentance, a bodhisattva can avoid malice and regard all bodhisattvas as their teacher and avoid competitive-mindedness.

Chapter 25. Training — To train in omniscience, a bodhisattva trains in suchness, without grasping onto either. It is also suggested in this chapter that the number of bodhisattvas who truly train in the Prajñāpāramitā are very few in number, but that the merit of practicing the Prajñāpāramitā is greater than any other practice. Bodhisattvas are thus able to teach śrāvakas by learning about their qualities, but do not fall to their yāna.

Chapter 26. Like Illusion — While bodhisattvas surpass all except buddhas, and the merits of their bodhicitta is said to be boundless, they are an illusion, and thus cannot know the illusion that is also full awakening. Their bodhicitta, too, is an illusion. Thus, they act conventionally in the world as puppets—knowing that this is hard to do, while there is no one to do it and nothing to do.

Chapter 27. The Core — In this way, bodhisattva practice is insubstantial, but they do not lose motivation because there is nothing that is there to lose motivation. Bodhisattvas practicing in this way are protected by devas, and praised by buddhas and bodhisattvas from other worlds.

Chapter 28. Avakīrṇakusuma — The Buddha declares that all the monks in the assembly will become buddhas called Avakīrṇakusuma. The Buddha then entrusts the sūtra to Ānanda for the first time, declaring that it should be worshipped. The Buddha makes a vision of Akṣobhya's buddha-field arise and cease, and says that just as it arises and ceases, one should not train in a fixed idea. In this way, the Prajñāpāramitā is declared to be boundless, and thus its form in book form is not really the Prajñāpāramitā. Finally it is said that the Prajñāpāramitā is consummated through seeing non-extinction of the skandhas and seeing the links of dependent origination.

Chapter 29. Approaches — The approach to the Prajñāpāramitā is said to be through non-conceptualisation in 54 aspects. The declarations of the Prajñāpāramitā are to be approached through the "roaring of a lion," but one should also know that the qualities of the skandhas are equal to those of the Prajñāpāramitā. Bodhisattvas who practice with this understanding are said to find it easy to become a buddha.

=== Chapters 30-32: Sadāprarudita and Conclusion ===
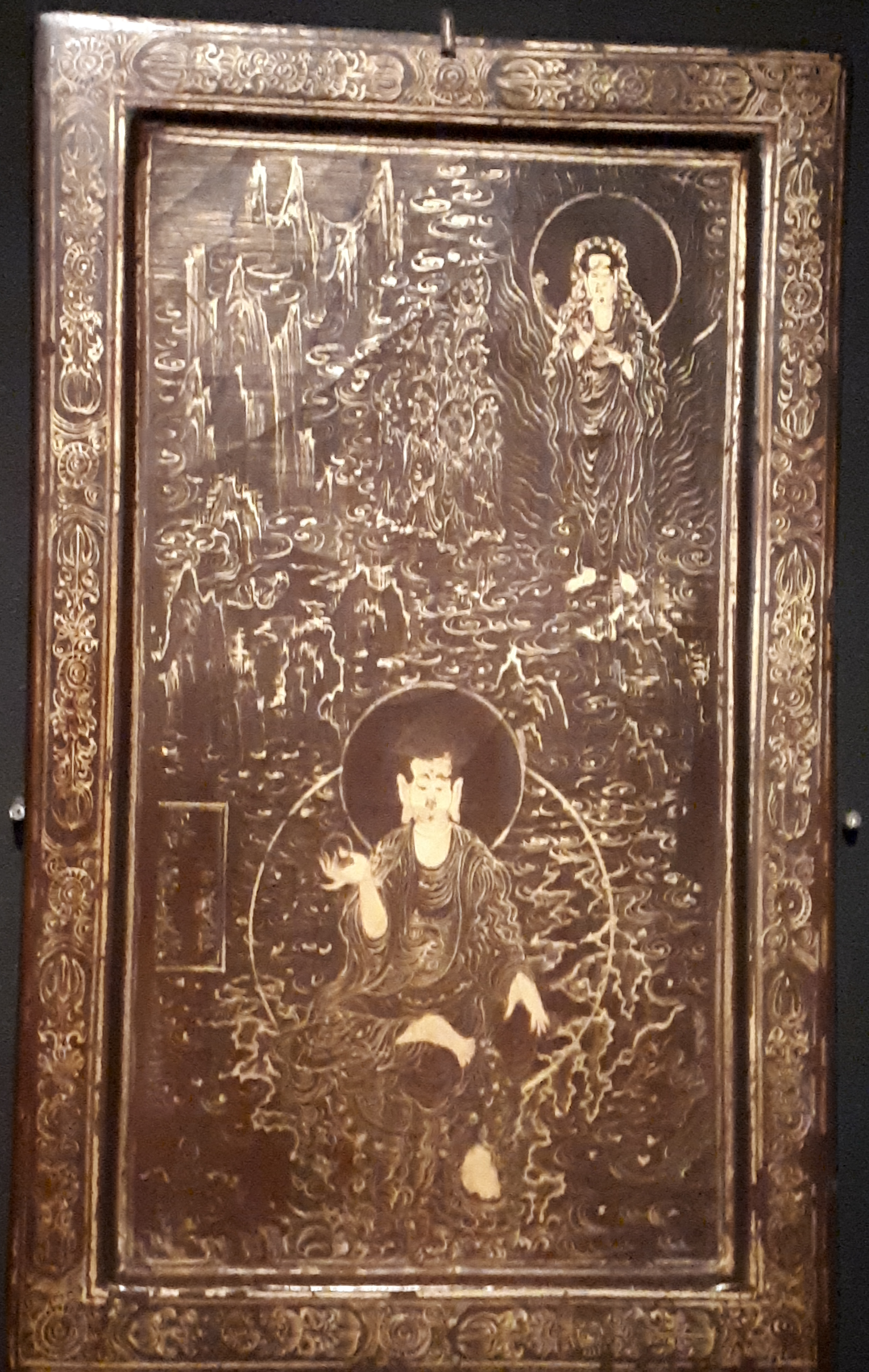
A 1307 Korean painting depicting Sadāprarudita rising in the air after learning from Dharmodgata.

Chapter 30. Sadāprarudita — The Buddha teaches Subhūti that one should seek the Prajñāpāramitā just like the Bodhisattva Sadāprarudita ("Always Weeping"). In relating his story, the Buddha explains that Sadāprarudita, who seeks the Prajñāpāramitā, is told to go east by a voice, and then told by visions of the buddhas to seek out Dharmodgata, a dharma teacher (dharmabhāṇaka) living in Gandhavatī. Sadāprarudita's desire at that point is to know from whence the buddhas came and to where they went. Not having anything to offer the teacher as payment, Sadāprarudita offers himself for payment, but Māra deafens everyone so that they cannot hear him. Knowing this, Śakra manifests as a brahmin who offers to buy Sadāprarudita's heart, blood, and marrow. Agreeing and dissecting himself, he is saved by a merchant's daughter who offers to help him with her riches. Seeing his resolve, Śakra restores Sadāprarudita's dissected body parts and magically disappears. After finding Dharmodgata and honouring him, Sadāprarudita asks him from whence the buddhas came and to where they went.

Chapter 31. Dharmodgata — In response, Dharmodgata suggests that the buddhas neither come nor go, since they are suchness. Sadāprarudita, rising in the air, offers himself to Dharmodgata. The merchant's daughter does likewise. Dharmodgata enters a samādhi for seven years—during this time, Sadāprarudita and the merchant's daughter stand outside his house for seven years. After leaving his samādhi, Dharmodgata teaches them the Prajñāpāramitā. Following this, Sadāprarudita enters millions of samādhis, including that of the "sameness of all phenomena."

Chapter 32. Entrusting — The Buddha concludes by saying that Sadāprarudita, from then on, was never deprived of vision of the buddhas.

After this, the Buddha again entrusts the sūtra to Ānanda, instructing him to copy and worship it as a book. He declares that so long as the Prajñāpāramitā exists, so long does the Buddha continue to teach the Dharma.

== Bibliography ==
- Beach, Milo Cleveland; Fischer, Eberhard; Goswamy, B.N., eds. (2016-03-09). Masters of Indian Painting. Volume I and II. Niyogi Books. ISBN 978-93-83098-68-2.
- Burnouf, Eugène; Buffetrille, Katia; Lopez Jr., Donald S. (2010). Introduction to the History of Indian Buddhism. University of Chicago Press. doi:10.7208/chicago/9780226081250.001.0001. ISBN 978-0-226-26968-9.
- Conze, Edward (1994). The Perfection of Wisdom in Eight Thousand Lines & Its Verse Summary. Delhi: Sri Satguru Publications. ISBN 81-7030-405-9. OCLC 643387102.
- Mitra, Rajendralala (1888). Ashṭasáhasriká : a collection of discourses on the metaphysics of the Mahayana school of the Buddhists. Asiatic Society of Bengal. OCLC 777860664.
- Orsborn, Matthew Bryan (2012). Chiasmus in the early Prajñāpāramitā : literary parallelism connecting criticism & hermeneutics in an early Mahāyāna sūtra (Doctor of Philosophy thesis). Pokfulam Road, Hong Kong SAR: The University of Hong Kong. doi:10.5353/th_b4775259. hdl:10722/181019.
- Vaidya, Paraśurāma Lakṣmaṇa, ed. (1960). Astasahasrika Prajñaparamita (in Hindi). Mithila Institute of Post-Graduate Studies and Research in Sanskrit Learning. OCLC 463112494.
