= Subhūticandra =

Buddhist monk and scholar

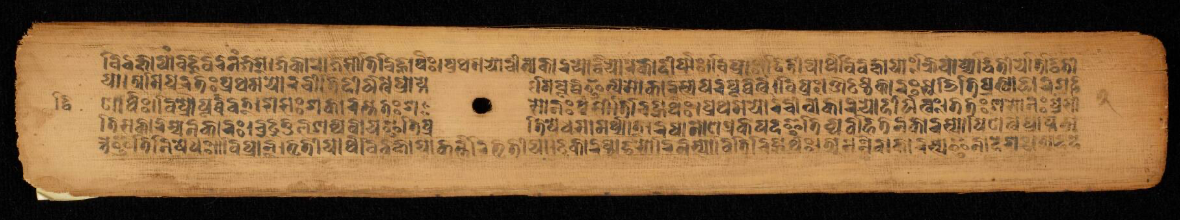
- 15th century manuscript of the Subantaratnākara by Subhūticandra. This was copied by a Nepalese Buddhist monk called Dharmaraṣika

Personal life
- Born: c. 11th century CE
- Died: c. 12th century CE
- Education: Nalanda; Vikramashila

Religious life
- Religion: Buddhism
- School: Mahayana

Subhūticandra (also spelled as Subhutichandra) was an 11/12th-century Indian Buddhist monk and scholar active in the monastic universities of Nalanda and Vikramashila. His most notable work is the Kavikāmadhenu which is a commentary on the Amarakośa which has been referred to as "one of the great monuments of Indian lexicography". In the 1930s, the historian and author, Rahul Sankrityayan discovered three palm leaf manuscripts of Subhūticandra's works written in the Magadhi script in Samye monastery. The Göttingen State and University Library has preserved one of these manuscripts while the other two have been kept in the library of Bihar Research Society in Patna.

From his works and translations, he had knowledge of Sanskrit, Prakrit and Tibetan and his works have been referenced and quoted in the historical literature of India, Burma, Tibet and Sri Lanka. The scholar, Lata Deokar has noted that very few Indian Buddhist writers have seen their works cross into such a wide geographic range.

== Life ==
Subhūticandra was active during the reign of the King Bhoja of the Paramara dynasty as he quotes from his work, the Shringara-Prakasha. This would place him at some point in the 11th and 12th centuries. Tibetan sources indicate that he was a scholar of grammar, poetry and Sanskrit at both the monasteries of Vikramashila and Nalanda. In Nalanda, he worked under the monk Abhayakaragupta; in Vikramasila, his masters were Śākyarakṣita and Aṭitacandra. The terminology and language used by Subhūticandra in his works indicate that he was a native of the region of Magadha in the modern-day state of Bihar in India.

His works and affiliation with other Buddhist scholars also make it clear that he was a devout Buddhist.

== Teachings ==
Subhūticandra was known for his extensive knowledge of Sanskrit grammar, particularly the Cāndra grammatical tradition. He cites various grammatical texts, including the Cāndravyākaraṇa, Cāndravṛtti, Cāndravyākaraṇapañjikā, and others. He also incorporates discussions from the Pāṇinian tradition, referencing texts like the Aṣṭādhyāyī and Vyākaraṇamahābhāṣya. Subhūticandra's work shows his familiarity with Prakrit grammars, quoting authors like Hevvara and texts such as Prākṛtaprakāśa.

In addition to grammar, Subhūticandra was knowledgeable in lexicography and poetics. His commentary on the Amarakośa—a seminal Sanskrit thesaurus—highlights his familiarity with this area.

=== Subantaratnākara ===
This text, attributed to Subhūticandra, is a lesser-known work that deals with the declension of nouns and adjectives according to the Cāndra grammatical school. The text is preserved in several manuscripts, primarily in Nepal. The Subantaratnākara underscores his contributions to grammatical analysis, particularly within the Buddhist scholastic tradition.

== Transmission ==
Subhūticandra was a teacher of notable figures, such as Pa tshab Lo tsā ba, who studied important Buddhist sutras with him at Vikramaśīla, further spreading his teachings.

Four manuscripts of the Kavikāmadhenu survive of which two have been found in Tibet and as they were written in the Newari script, they were likely copied in the Kathmandu Valley. One of these manuscripts was in the Sakya Monastery complex while the other was held at the Ngor evaṃ chos ldan Monastery north of the Sakya monastery. It is unknown how these manuscripts entered Tibet. The Ngor monastery manuscript has been dated to 1191.

== Works ==
- Kavikāmadhenu
- Subvidhānaśabdamālāparikrama
- Subantaratnākara, a commentary on the Subvidhānaśabdamālāparikrama
- An abridged version of the Rūpāvatāra
