= Buddhajñānapāda =

Indian Buddhist monk

Personal life
- Born: c. 770 CE
- Died: c. 820 CE
- Education: Vikramashila; Nalanda

Religious life
- Religion: Buddhism
- School: Vajrayana

Senior posting
- Teacher: Haribhadra

Buddhajñānapāda (also known as Buddhaśrījñāna, Jñānapāda and Śrījñānapāda) (c. 770–820 CE) was an Indian Buddhist monk and scholar. He is associated with the transmission of the Guhyasamāja Tantra of the Vajrayana school of Buddhism.

He is notable for being the first abbot of the mahavihara of Vikramashila which is now situated in the modern-day state of Bihar. He was probably a guru working in the court of the Pala Empire prior to this and was a disciple of Haribhadra who was the preceptor of Dharmapala. His writings survive in both their original Sanskrit as well as in later Tibetan translations.

== Life ==
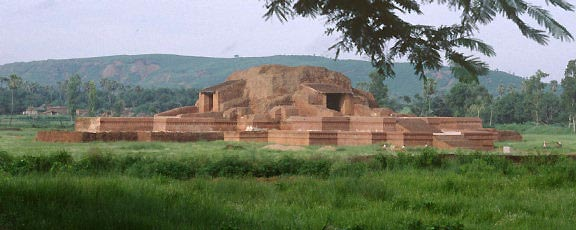
The main stupa at Vikramashila monastery

Sources on Buddhajñānapāda come from his own treatise, entitled the Mukhāgama and also from the subsequent commentaries that followed this, some by his disciples. This work now only survives in its Tibetan translation which has therefore left some uncertainty regarding place names.

Buddhajñānapāda doesn't provide any information on his place of birth or ancestry. Instead, his biography begins at the still-unidentified monastery of Trikaṭuka where he studied with his teacher, Haribhadra. Later he travelled to and taught at Nalanda mahavihara. At Nalanda, a bhikkhuni of noble ancestry called Guṇamitrā requested him to compose some works for her. These works likely relate to the Prajñāpāramitā as the colophon of these works on this topic mentions her name. Following his stay at Nalanda, he then travelled to the region of Oddiyana where he received teachings from a monk called Vilāsavajra. Hagiographic sources then identify that his next teacher was the goddess Lakshmi who instructed him for a period of eight months at a locality that has been identified as possibly the Wakhan corridor. At the time, the Wakhan region was under the occupation of the Tibetan Empire. After wandering at other locations in the north, he later travelled to the Konkan region in Western India where he spent nine years being instructed by a guru called Pālitapāda with whom he learnt the Guhyasamāja Tantra. However, he did not find what he learnt fulfilling enough so his next destination was the vicinity of Bodh Gaya where he stayed at Konch. Here he studied intensively for six months for the purpose of writing the Mukhāgama. He also spent time around Rajgir where he composed further works and taught students. He also spent time around Rajgir where he composed further works and taught students. As per Buddhajñānapāda himself, he had eighteen students in his retinue at this time.

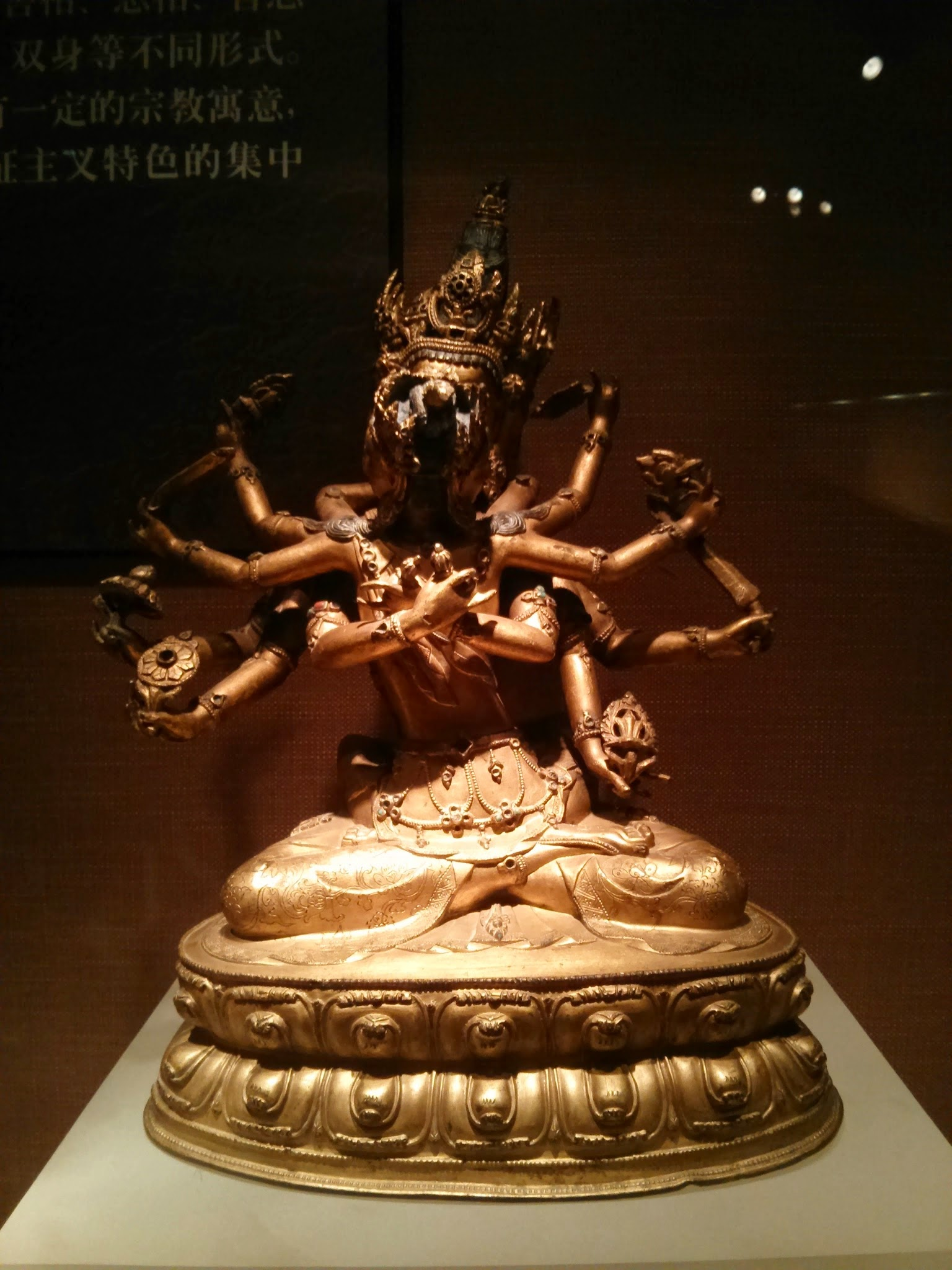
Statue of Guhyasamaja in union with consort, Capital Museum

Buddhajñānapāda is silent at this point about his career however Tibetan sources confirm that following this, he took part in the consecration of Vikramashila and took on the role of head monk/abbot. The eleventh-century monk, Atiśa who also studied at Vikramashila during a later period writes that Buddhajñānapāda organised large rituals to honour King Dharmapala and bestowed tantric initiations on Dharamapala's son; Devapala for which he was given treasures in return.

== Works ==
The Tibetan canon lists fifteen texts that have been written by Buddhajñānapāda however some of these attributions are questionable. These works include:

- Saṃcayagāthāpañjikā
- Mahāyānalakṣaṇasamuccaya
- Prajñāpradīpāvalī
- Mukhāgama
- Catuṣpīṭhatantra
- Samantabhadrasādhana
- Ātmasādhanāvatāra
- Muktitilaka

There are other works other than the above attributed to Buddhajñānapāda however these are smaller in scope or found to be incomplete. Buddhajñānapāda's style of writing has been described as "terse and elegant" and his rhetorical skill was noted by his contemporaries and emulated by his spiritual descendants. Buddhajñānapāda also made references to non-Buddhist religions indicating that he lived at a time when there was a lot of intellectual interaction between different religions within India. There is still an ongoing debate as to whether he fell within the Yogachara or Madhyamaka schools of thought.
