= Ānandagarbha =

Indian Buddhist tantric master

Ānandagarbha was a 9th-century Indian Buddhist tantric master notable for authoring numerous works including the Sarvavajrodayā and the Vajrajvālodayā. As per Tibetan sources, 25 works are attributed to him a few of which have survived in Sanskrit.

The Tibetan historian and monk, Taranatha noted that he was born into a Vaishya family in Magadha and associated with the Vikramashila monastery which was patronized by the Pala Empire. He was ordained in the Mahāsāṃghika school of thought within Mahayana Buddhism. 21 works in the Tengyur have been attributed to Anandagarbha.

== The Vajrajvālodayā ==
The Vajrajvālodayā is a sādhanā manual aimed towards the tantric deity Heruka and his mandala and consists of 17 palm leaves. The work has so far remained unpublished; however, parts of it have been transcribed and translated into English. Structurally, the work is similar to other ritual manuals like the Tattvasamgraha with the use of the same mudras and mantras. The Vajrajvālodayā was not translated into Tibetan, even though its Sanskrit manuscript was not found in India but in Samye, Tibet.
