= Katia Buffetrille =

French tibetologist

Katia Buffetrille is a French ethnologist and tibetologist. She works at the École pratique des hautes études (EPHE 5th section). Her doctoral thesis is entitled Montagnes sacrées, lacs et grottes : lieux de pèlerinage dans le monde tibétain. Traditions écrites. Réalités vivantes (thesis national number: 1996PA100065). She has done fieldwork in Tibet and Nepal, researching pilgrimage, non-Buddhist beliefs, and sacred geography.

She is in charge of a seminar on rituals at the CRCAO (Centre de recherches sur les civilisations de l'Asie orientale; UMR 8155) and is editor of the journal Études mongoles, sibériennes, centrasiatiques et tibétaines (EMSCAT).

== Works ==
- Buffetrille, Katia (1994). The Halase-Maratika Caves (Eastern Nepal): A sacred place claimed by both Hindus and Buddhists. Pondy Papers in Social Sciences. Vol. 16. Pondicherry: Institut Français de Pondicherry.
- 1998: Tibétains, 1959-1999, quarante ans de colonisation, with Charles Ramble; Volume 108 of Autrement: Collection Monde, ISBN 2-86260-822-X
- 2000: Pèlerins, lamas et visionnaires. Sources orales et écrites sur les pèlerinages tibétains coll. Arbeitskreis für Tibetische und Buddhistische Studien Universität Wien.
- 2002: Le Tibet est-il chinois ? with Anne-Marie Blondeau and Wei Jing, Paris: Albin Michel, Sciences des religions.
- 2002: Tibet, jours de fêtes, with Eric Lobo, Published by Romain Pagès. ISBN 2-84350-104-0
- 2008: Authenticating Tibet: Answers to China's One-Hundred Questions with Anne-Marie Blondeau (as editors), University of California Press, Berkeley. (Adapted and updated translation of Le Tibet est-il chinois ? ISBN 978-0-520-24464-1
- 2012: Revisiting rituals in a changing Tibetan context (ed.). Leiden: Brill, 2012. ISBN 978-90-04-23217-4
- Buffetrille, Katia (2012). "Low Tricks and High Stakes Surrounding a Holy Place in Eastern Nepal: The Halesi-Māratika Caves". In Buffetrille, Katia (ed.). Revisiting Rituals in a Changing Tibetan World. Brill's Tibetan Studies Library. Vol. 31. Leiden / Boston: Brill. pp. 163–208. ISBN 9789004232174. ISSN 1568-6183.
