= Dharmakīrtiśrī =

Buddhist teacher and philosopher

Dharmakīrtiśrī (Tibetan: Serlingpa; Wylie: gser gling pa; Chinese: 金州大師, literally "from Suvarnadvīpa"), also known as Kulānta and Suvarṇadvipi Dharmakīrti, was a renowned 10th century Buddhist teacher. His name refers to the region he lived, somewhere in Lower Burma, the Malay Peninsula or Sumatra.

Dharmakīrtiśrī was the teacher of a number of important late Mahayana Buddhist thinkers, including Ratnākaraśānti (fl. c. 970–1045), Atiśa, Jñānaśrīmitra and Ratnakīrti (both fl. late 10–early 11th c.).

Dharmakīrtiśrī is the author of the Durbodhālokā (Light on the Hard-to-Illuminate), a sub-commentary to the Abhisamayālaṃkāra-śāstra-vṛtti of Haribhadra. A Sanskrit manuscript of this work was discovered in the 20th century at Sakya Monastery.
