= Jitāri =

Jitāri (or Jetāri, Tibetan Wylie: Dgra las rnam rgyal, c. latter half of the 10th century) was an influential Indian Buddhist philosopher who followed the Epistemological school of Dharmakīrti and Madhyamaka. He is considered one of the greatest panditas of the 10th century. He was the teacher of Atiśa (c. 982–1054), Ratnākaraśānti and Durvekamiśra (c. 970–1030). Jitāri is also the name of one of the eighty-four mahāsiddhas.

== Life and thought ==
Some details about Jitāri's life can be gleaned for various sources. According to a later biographical sketch by Taranatha Jitāri was born in Varendra (Bengal). His father Garbhapāda attended the court of King Sanātana of Varendra, a vassal of the Pālas. Jitāri's father was a tantric guru who initiated him into Buddhist Vajrayana practices (especially that of Mañjughoṣa) as well as the study of Buddhist philosophy. Jitāri eventually became a renowned scholar and was granted the title of Paṇḍịta at Vikramaśilā university by King Mahāpāla (r. until 940 CE). Tibetan sources mention that Jitāri was a teacher of Atiśa and Ratnākaraśānti at Vikramaśilā. Apparently he remained a lay disciple (upasaka) throughout his life.

Regarding his philosophical position, Tibetan authors often classify him as a Yogācāra-Svātantrika Mādhyamika. According to Junjie Chu, in his Topics of Debate (Vādasthānāni), Jitāri follows the consciousness-only system of Dharmakīrti. In the Verses on the Classification of Buddhist Systems (Sugatamatavibhaṅgakārikā, lit. "Differentiating the Sugata's Texts") however, he outlines the Yogācāra system and then later refutes the ultimate existence of consciousness from a Madhyamaka perspective. Junjie Chu also argues that Jitāri supports the Vijñānavāda theory which says that awareness has the image of the object (sākāravāda).

Thus, according to Junjie Chu:

If we do not assume that there are two philosophers who bear the same name, we have to consider the possibility that Jitāri articulates his different philosophical positions in his two works. In his philosophical work Topics of Debate, he refutes various mainly non-Buddhist theories from the Yogācāra point of view, and in his doxographical work Verses on the Classification of Buddhist Systems and its Commentary, he refutes Yogācāra theory from the Madhyamaka position. In this reading, we can say that he speaks differently to different audiences. Another possibility, however, is that these two works were composed in different periods and that in between these two periods, his thought underwent a radical change from the one philosophical perspective to the other. Since the edition and the philosophico-historical studies on the Topics of Debate are still in the early stage, no decisive conclusion can be offered.

However, Jitāri seems to have seen both systems as ultimately having the same intent. Even in the Verses on the Classification of Buddhist Systems, Jitāri heavily relies on Dharmakirti's system of reasoning throughout the text, calling him "the crest jewel of epistemologists", and "the supreme lord of reasoning". Towards the end of the text, he quotes Dharmakirti and attempts to prove that his ultimate view was also the view of Madhyamaka, writing: "What intelligent person would believe that Dharmakirti was averse to the Madhyamaka siddhanta?".

== Works ==
Jitāri was a prolific author, writing on many Buddhist and non-Buddhist topics that were discussed in the epistemological tradition of Dharmakirti.

His works include many works of philosophy, epistemology (pramana) and reasoning (hetuvidya). Many of these were collected together into a compendium called Topics of Debate (Vādasthānāni). Some of his philosophical works include:

- Apohasiddhi (Proof of Exclusion)
- Avayaviniṣedha (Negation of the Naiyāyika's Concept of the Whole Consisting in Parts of a Gross Object)
- Īśvaravādimataparīkṣā (Examination of the Doctrine of God / Īśvara)
- Kṣaṇabhaṅgasiddhi (Proof of Momentariness)
- Kṣaṇabaṅgopanyāsa (Introduction to Momentariness)
- Akṣaṇikavādavicāra (Examination of the Theory of Non-Momentariness)
- Jātinirākṛti (Analysis of Caste)
- On the Theory of the Generic Property or Universal ( Jātivāda
- Jātyādiniṣedha (Negation of the Existence of Universals)
- Sāmānyanirākṛti (Refutation of the Existence of Universals)
- Digambaramataparīkṣā (Examination of the Jain Digambara Doctrine) or Anekāntavādanirāsa (Refutation of Anekāntavāda)
- Dvijātidūṣaṇa (Critique of the Twice-born Caste)
- Dharmadharmiviniścaya (Ascertainment of Property and the Property-Bearer)
- Nairātmyasiddhi (Proof of selflessness)
- Bālāvatāratarka (Logic Introduced to Unlearned Persons), a work on epistemology for beginners
- Bhāvikāraṇavāda (On the Doctrine of Retrocausality), this has been translated into English by Eli Franco.
- *Refutation of Pratyabhijñā Philosophy
- *Vādasthānāni (Grounds for Argumentation)
- Vijñaptimātratāsiddhi (Proof of Consciousness-only)
- Vedāprāmāṇyasiddhi (On the Epistemic Invalidity of the Vedas)
- Vyāpakānupalambha (On the Non-Perception of the Pervader)
- Śrutikartṛsiddhi (Proof of the Human Authorship of the Vedic Injunction)
- Śabdāprāmāṇya (On the Invalidity of Vedic Verbal Testimony)
- Sarvajñasiddhi (Proof of Omniscience)
- Sahopalambha (The theory of simultaneous perception of objects and knowledge)
- Sāmagrībhaṅga (Destruction of the Causal Complex)
- Hetutattvopadeśa (Instruction on the True Nature of a Reason)
- Verses on the Classification of Buddhist Systems and its commentary (Sugatamatavibhaṅgakārikā and Sugatamatavibhaṅgabhāṣya), a doxographic work which follows Āryadeva's Jñānasārasamuccaya.

He also wrote various Mahayana works and commentaries including:

- Commentary on the Śikṣāsamuccaya
- Commentary on the Bodhicaryāvatāra
- Commentary on the Ākāśagarbha-sūtra
- Bodhicittotpādasamādānavidhi, a ‘ritual manual’ for the bodhisattva precepts based on the Bodhicaryāvatāra.
- Ādikarmikabhūmipariṣkāra, a summary of the basics of the Mahayana path for neophyte bodhisattvas.
- Bodhyāpattideśanāvṛtti-bodhisattvaśikṣākrama-nāma, a ritual manual for confessing the breaking of bodhisattva precepts.
- Cittaratnaviśodhanakrama-nāma-lekha - an epistle on controlling the mind addressed to a king.

Jitāri also wrote various Vajrayana works, mostly tantric sadhanas and ritual texts on various deities like Hevajra, Candamaharosana, Avalokiteshvara, Aksobhya, Prajnaparamita, Pancaraksa, and Aparamitayus.

== See also ==
- Prajñakaragupta
- Retrocausality
- Idealism
- Buddhist logico-epistemology
- Epistemology
