= Ratnakīrti =

Indian Buddhist philosopher

Personal life
- Born: c. early 11th century
- Died: c. late 11th century
- Education: Vikramashila

Religious life
- Religion: Buddhism
- School: Yogācāra

Senior posting
- Teacher: Jñanasrimitra

Ratnakīrti (11th century CE) was an Indian Buddhist philosopher of the Yogācāra and epistemological (pramāṇavāda) schools who wrote on logic, philosophy of mind and epistemology. Ratnakīrti studied at the Vikramaśīla monastery in modern-day Bihar. He was a pupil of Jñānaśrīmitra, and Ratnakīrti refers to Jñānaśrīmitra in his work as his guru with phrases such as yad āhur guravaḥ.

Ratnakīrti's work has been termed as "more concise and logical though not so poetical" compared to that of his teacher, although he does build on much of Jñānaśrīmitra's work.

== Life ==
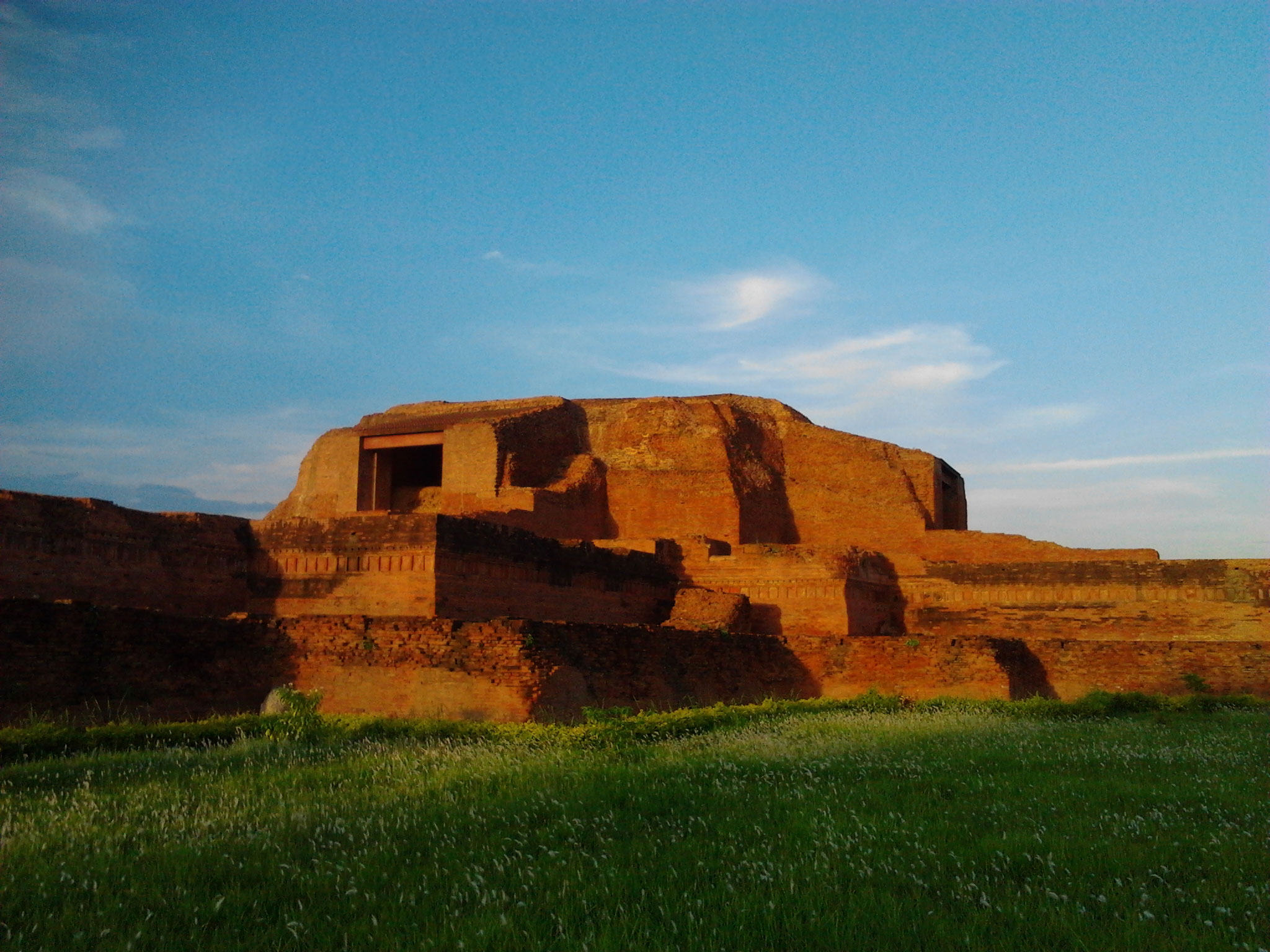
The main stupa at Vikramashila

Ratnakīrti was active sometime between 1000 and 1050 CE. Among his contemporaries at Vikramashila were Ratnākaraśānti and Jñanasrimitra. Ratnakīrti engaged with both of them on an intellectual level and it is clear that Ratnakīrti was Jñānaśrīmitra's student on subjects relating to logico-epistemological topics as the former often quotes the latter as his "guru".

With Ratnākaraśānti, the relationship was more complex as it is likely that Ratnakīrti was his pupil on topics related to tantra however Yuichi Kajiyama states that "Ratnākaraśānti learned Buddhism, exoteric and esoteric, under Ratnakīrti and others."

== Philosophy ==
=== The problem of other minds ===
Ratnakīrti's Refutation of Other Mindstreams (Santānāntaradūṣaṇa) argued that knowledge of external streams of consciousness (citta-santāna) is a form of inference (anumāna) and not direct perception (pratyakṣa). Ratnakīrti introduced the two truths doctrine as key to the nature of the discussion. Since inference deals with conceptual universals, the proof of the mindstreams of others, while empirically valid in relative truth (saṃvṛtisatya), does not hold ultimate metaphysical certainty in absolute truth (paramārthasatya). Ratnakīrti, therefore argued that at the ultimate level, there is only an undifferentiated non-dual consciousness (vijñānādvaita) since one cannot differentiate consciousness as a whole into different individual minds.

Ratnakīrti quotes from Jñānaśrīmitra's Sākārasiddhiśāstra:

If one’s own mind is distinct from another by nature, it should appear together with a limiting object (avadhi), [i.e., another mind]. [Therefore, one’s own mind should not be distinct from another.] Nor should it be apprehended that [one’s own mind] is identical with [another mind].

This means that any knowledge of a distinction between two things depends on perceiving those two things, and seeing how they are different. However, one can only perceive one's own mind. Therefore, one’s mind cannot be shown to be distinct from other minds (at the same time, one's own mind also cannot be shown to be identical to other minds since, again, this knowledge would be based on perceiving other minds as well). Roy Perrett explains, "Our knowledge of distinction depends upon our knowledge of two things, but we only perceive our own minds. There is, then, no way to draw a boundary (avadhi) between distinct psychological streams, and no way to individuate minds."

Inami observes that Ratnakīrti's view of other minds resembles Prajñākaragupta's and Jñānaśrīmitra's views on causality and validity. According to Prajñākaragupta and Jñānaśrīmitra, in order for causality to be established, two things must be perceived. Yet two things are never perceived in reality. Similarly, validity requires a correspondence based on two cognitions. However, each cognition reveals only its own object, but not a correspondence with another. In this way, nonduality is accepted as ultimate, and causality and validity are conventional. Similarly, Ratnakīrti maintains that a distinction between one's own and other minds cannot be accepted ultimately, since such a distinction is never known. At the same time, he does not deny that other minds exist conventionally.

Ratnakīrti provides three consequences which would follow if the distinction between one's own mind and another were accepted. First, one would also have to accept a distinction between one's own mind and external objects, which all Vijñānavādins deny. Second, if a distinction between two things which are never perceived together is accepted, it would follow that causality would be established as well. This is because, although cause and effect are never apprehended together (since only one of them exists at a time), a distinction must nonetheless be accepted. In such a way, causality, which implies a distinction between cause and effect, would be accepted. However, this would contradict Dharmakīrti's Pramāṇavārttika, which states that causality exists only conventionally. Third, if a distinction exists between minds, the non-duality of cognition defended by Vijñānavādins would be "refuted by perception grasping a distinction. Since cognition has nonduality, no distinction can be perceived."

In addition to pointing out that other minds cannot be directly perceived, Ratnakīrti also rejects that other minds may be inferred. Before Ratnakīrti, Dharmakīrti argued that other minds can be validly inferred, since we witness others' bodily actions and speech. Since these do not result from our own intentions, they must imply the intentions of other minds in general. While inference cannot establish the unique characteristics of a particular phenomenon, it may nonetheless establish a universal, or general property. However, for Ratnakīrti, the causal relation between the general intention of another and the appearance of an action cannot be established. This is unlike instances of seeing smoke and inferring fire in the distance. In such cases, a general causal connection is established because, while fire is not perceived directly, it would be perceived if one were nearer to it. However, while bodily actions and speech are perceived, they can never lead us to the perception of a common intention in the minds of others. Such intention is substantially different from the kind of intention which causes action, just as the "fire of digestion" (jaṭharāgni), which is never perceived, is substantially different from the kind of fire that causes smoke. In this way, Ratnakīrti rejects both other minds in particular and in general.

Ratnakīrti argued that from an ultimate point of view, not only do the distinctions between a subject and object disappear, but also distinctions between any and all individual subjects. Ratnakīrti's theory sees no logical foundation for individuating mindstreams, and so there are no boundaries between minds from the perspective of ultimate truth. Since this non-duality of minds only applies at the level of ultimate truth, Ratnakīrti does not think this invalidates the Mahayana path which is based on compassion for all beings (who do exist at the level of conventional truth).

Ratnakīrti responds to an objection that, although other minds cannot be proven to exist, the nonexistence of other minds cannot be proven either. Ratnakīrti's solution aims to reject other minds by implication, by denying the distinction between one's own and other minds, rather than disproving other minds directly. That is, according to Inami, Ratnakīrti "considers that the denial of the distinction implies the nonexistence of other minds." Thus, by "denying the distinction between one’s own mind and another, Ratnakīrti proves the nonexistence of another mind."

Roy Perrett addresses the question of whether Ratnakīrti's assertion that there is no way to draw a distinction between one's own consciousness and another entails solipsism, the view that only one's own mind exists. Perrett writes, "Does this mean that ultimately Buddhist idealism collapses into solipsism? Not if by 'solipsism' we mean the thesis that there is only one mind – my own. The lack of a conceptualisable boundary between my mind and the minds of others means that ultimately neither other minds, nor my mind can be coherently said to exist. So Buddhist idealism does not entail solipsism." Similarly, according to Inami, for Ratnakīrti:

...the denial of other minds does not mean the affirmation of the sole existence of one’s own mind. Ratnakīrti, who refuses the distinction between one’s own mind and others, must deny not only the existence of other minds but also the existence of one’s own mind. For the notion of “one’s own mind” also depends on the same distinction. When the distinction disappears, even one’s own mind cannot survive at all. Moreover, if the notion of “one’s own” or “self” were admitted, the ātmavāda would be accepted.

Since the ultimate truth is nonduality, Ratnakīrti insists that one should finally cling neither to the acceptance nor denial of other minds in the end. That is, since all distinctions ultimately disappear, neither proof nor refutation can be admitted as absolute. In this way, ultimate truth is beyond logical argument, including both arguments for and against other minds.

=== The ultimate existence ===
Ratnakīrti elaborates his concept of ultimate reality further in his “Debating Multifaceted Nonduality” (Citrādvaitaprakāśavāda). The ultimate reality is the direct object of perception, the only object of consciousness which is not associated with mental construction (vikalpa). It is what is consciously manifested (prakāśa) in awareness and what is directly known by awareness. According to Ratnakīrti's Citrādvaitaprakāśavāda, whatever is manifest to awareness is one single (eka), nondual (advaita) image. Ratnakīrti further argues that this image is a complex, multifaceted and dynamic reality. Thus, it contains within it many sub-images or aspects, such as colors, tastes, and so on (covering all possible qualias). Thus it is a multifaceted nonduality (citrādvaita), a single image with a myriad number of aspects. This image is also reflexively self-aware and is thus not different from awareness or consciousness.

Thus, for Ratnakīrti, at the level of ultimate truth, there is nothing but a single multifaceted image which also includes self-awareness (svasaṃvedana). This is the only thing that truly exists at the ultimate level of reality. This is the single ground of all individuation and conceptual constructions (out of which the individual mindstreams and myriad mental experiences are constructed). All other objects that are not this non-dual self-aware manifestation (such as persons, universals, concepts, the external world etc) can only be conventionally real (saṃvṛti).

Ratnakīrti's monistic interpretation of Yogācāra is known as the Citrādvaitavāda school (the view of variegated non-duality) or Vijñānādvaitavāda school (the view of non-dual consciousness).

=== Other views ===
Ratnakīrti's "Refutation of Arguments Establishing Īśvara" (Īśvarasādhanadūṣaṇa) argued against the Hindu concept of a creator God. He wrote that it is not possible to establish Īśvara through inference as the Naiyāyikas did. The text begins with an explanation of the Nyāya belief system, followed by a criticism of inferences that establish an intelligent creator.

Ratnakīrti's "Proof of Exclusion" (Apohasiddhi) establishes a theory of exclusion that follows Dignāga's theory of the same. It explains how thoughts and perception become understood through inference, and it is a theory of definitions and meaning-making. There are three types of exclusion described in the text.

== Works ==
Works attributed to Ratnakīrti include:

- Apohasiddhi - This text focuses on the key theory of exclusion (apoha) and defends his views on it from critics
- Īśvarasādhanadūṣaṇa - This work critiques theories of a singular creator deity, which Hindu thinkers call Īśvara.
- Kṣaṇabhaṅgasiddhi (Proving momentariness) - Defends the theory of momentariness, the view that all dharmas (phenomena) last only for a moment.
- Citrādvaitaprakāśavāda - The non-dual mind manifests awareness variously. This awareness takes the form of a single image, and the various aspects of the image comprise perception.
- Pramāṇāntarbhāvaprakaraṇa - A work on epistemology (pramana)
- Vyāptinirṇaya - Inspired by the Vyāpticarcā of Jñānaśrīmitra, it clarifies the main ideas about the limits of logical pervasion (vyāpti).
- Santānāntaradūṣaṇa (Refutation of Other mindstreams)
- Sarvajñasiddhi (Perfection of knowledge)
- Sthirasiddhidūṣaṇa - A refutation of the idea that dharmas endure for longer than a moment
- Udayanīrakaranam

The works are compiled in Ratnakīrtinibandhāvali.

== See also ==
- Dharmakīrti
- Prajñākaragupta
- Non-dualism
- Yogācāra
- Abhayakaragupta
- Ānandagarbha
- Atiśa
- Drogmi
- Jñanasrimitra
- Haribhadra
- Naropa
- Ratnākaraśānti

== Sources ==
- McAllister, Patrick (2020). Ratnakīrti's Proof of Exclusion. Austrian Academy of Sciences Press. ISBN 978-3-7001-8400-3
- McAllister, Patrick. "Ratnakirti and Dharmottara on the Object of Activity." Journal of Indian Philosophy; Dordrecht Vol. 42, Iss. 2-3, (Jun 2014): 309-326.
- Patil, Parimal G. (2009). Against a Hindu God: Buddhist Philosophy of Religion in India. New York: Columbia University Press. ISBN 978-0-231-14222-9
- McDermott, A.C. (2012). An Eleventh-Century Buddhist Logic of 'Exists' Ratnakīrti's Kṣaṇabhaṅgasiddhiḥ Vyatirekātmikā. Springer Nature. ISBN 978-94-010-3387-9
