= Nature of mind =

Nature of mind (Sanskrit: cittatā or citta-dharmatā; Tibetan: སེམས་ཉིད་, semnyi; Wyl. sems nyid) may refer to:

- Dharmatā, also called suchness or thatness (Tathātā), the true nature of all things in Mahayana Buddhism
- Svasaṃvedana, the self-reflexive nature of consciousness in Buddhism
- Mahāmudrā, the unity of awareness and emptiness in the Kagyu tradition of Gampopa
