= Vāgīśvarakīrti =

Vāgīśvarakīrti (also known by the monastic name of Śīlakīrti) was an 11th-century Indian Buddhist monk and scholar at the monastery of Vikramashila in the modern-day state of Bihar. He played a significant role in the development of esoteric Buddhism.

== Life ==
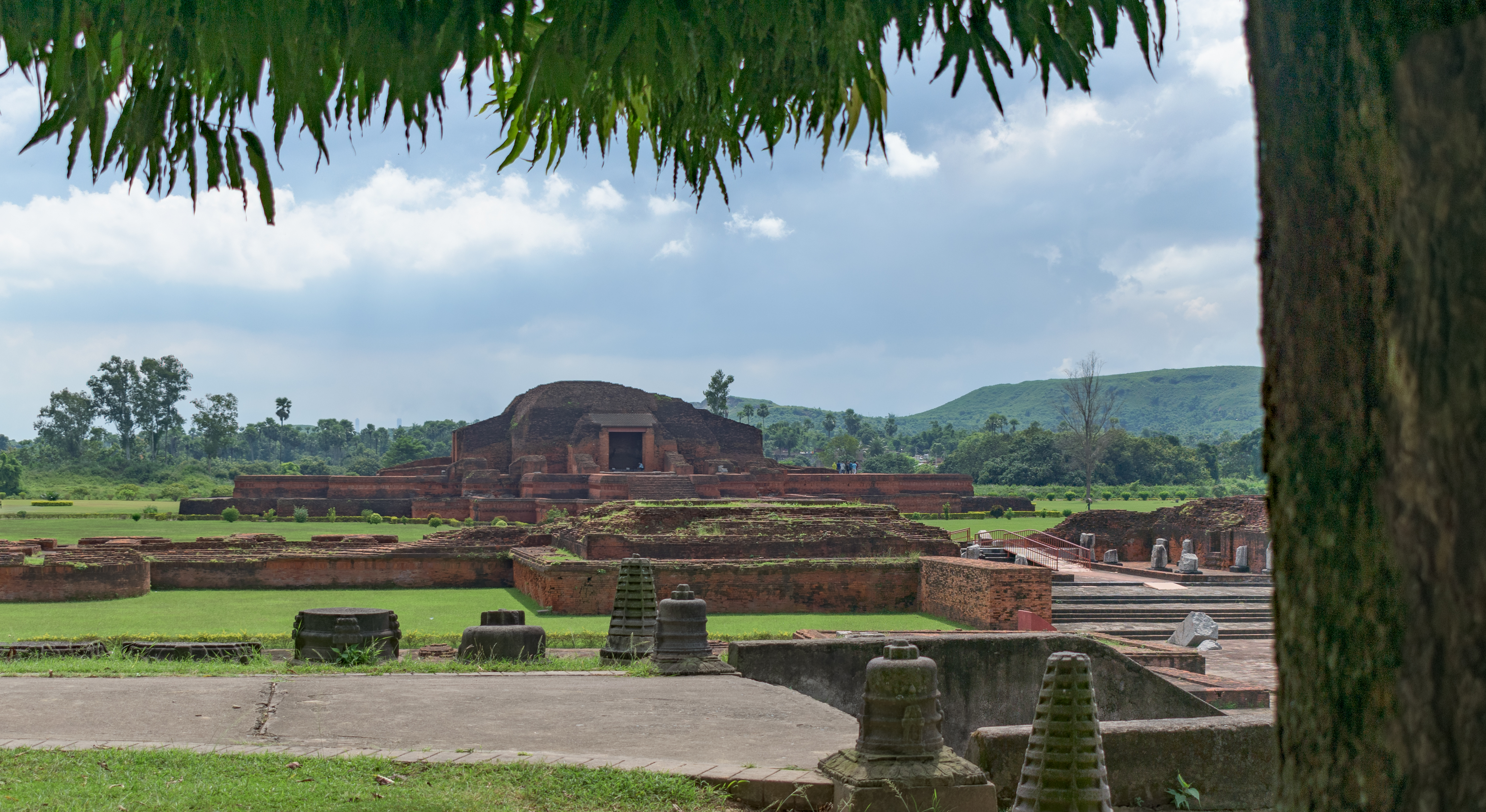
Panorama of Vikramaśīla monastery, modern day Bhagalpur district, Bihar.

The exact dates of Vāgīśvarakīrti life are uncertain. As per the 16th-century Tibetan monk, Taranatha who provided a detailed account of his life, Vāgīśvarakīrti was born into a noble family in Varanasi. He was initiated as a monk by Hāsavajra who taught him Cakrasaṃvara Tantra. He roamed throughout the Magadha region and arrived at the monastery of Vikramashila where he became one of the so-called "six gate-keepers". He was said to have been a contemporary of Ratnākaraśānti.

Later in his life, he travelled to Nepal. At a dedication ceremony which took place in the Swayambhunath temple complex in Kathmandu, Vāgīśvarakīrti was the officiant at a Ganachakra ritual. As per legends that emerged in the 15th century, he is still said to be residing there.

== Influence ==
As per the scholar, Péter-Dániel Szántó, Vāgīśvarakīrti's works were notable enough during his lifetime, to merit contestation and discussion in Kashmir and in the Khmer Empire.

The Kashmiri monk, Ratnavajra, launched an attack on Vāgīśvarakīrti in his work, the Gūḍhapadā which is a commentary on the Mañjuśrīnāmasaṃgīti. He states that he has read Vāgīśvarakīrti's work, the Caturthāloka and believes the author to be an "ignoramus" as he disagrees with the idea of a fourth initiation (Caturthābhiṣeka).

The Sab Bāk inscription was discovered in what is now Nakhon Ratchasima province, Thailand. The inscription mixes Sanskrit verses with Old Khmer. Part of the inscription is believed to echo Vāgīśvarakīrti's words:

"In all my existences, may I become a servant of the servant who has supreme devotion and stainless faith in the glorious Samāja. Having thus heard the command of the supreme guru, I respect it with praises, (and) having repeated it with devotion, I always pay homage to the glorious Samāja."

Szántó states that this is Vāgīśvarakīrti's "signature verse" and a reference to his works which had spread to the Khmer Empire.

=== White Tara ===
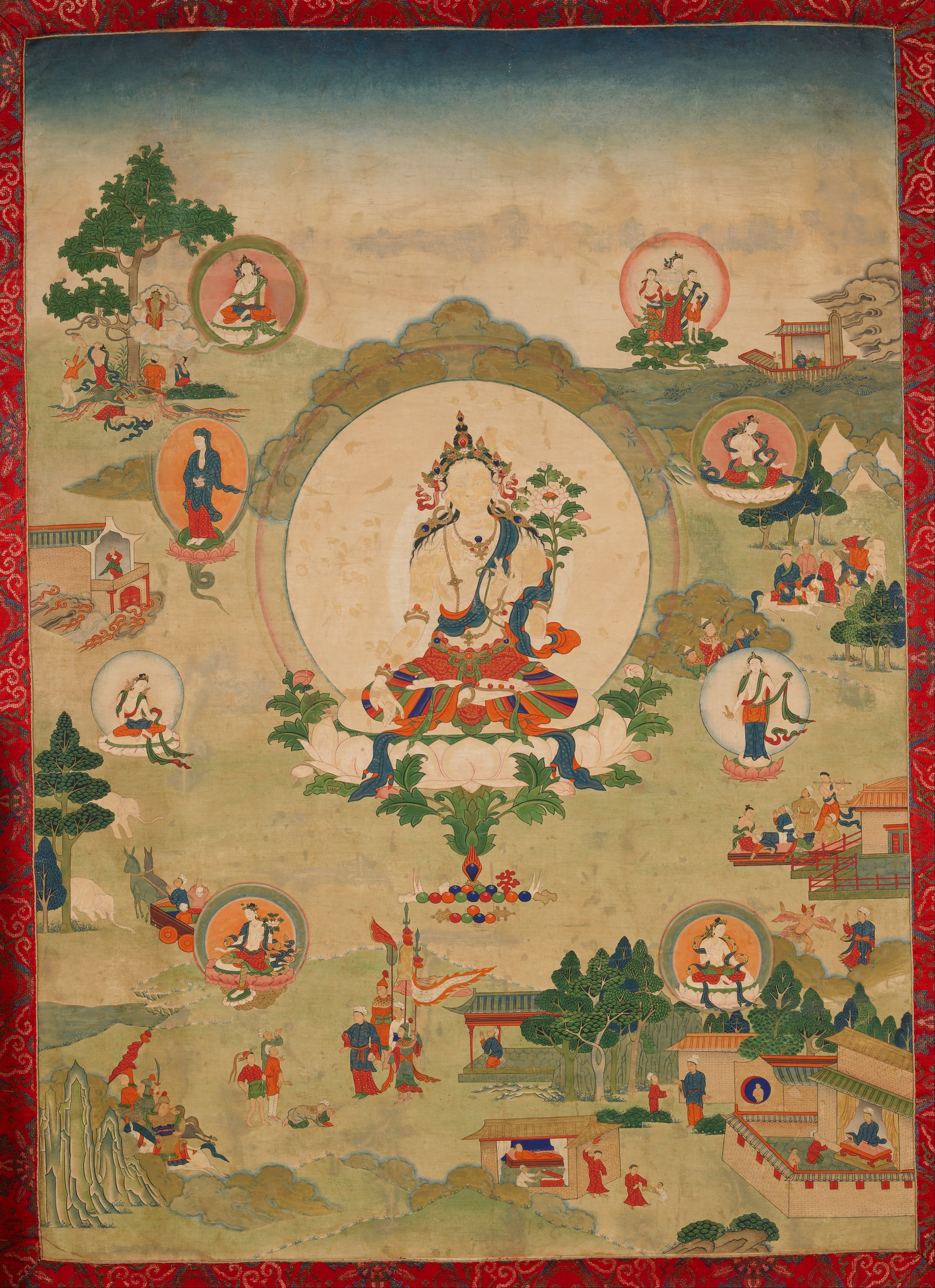
Tibetan painting of White Tara

Vāgīśvarakīrti also played a role in the propagation of the worship of White Tara and this deity was the focus of his text, the Mṛtyuvañcanopadeśa in conjunction with other deities. He was also held to have received a personal revelation from White Tara and is therefore used as a source for her worship in Tibet.

== Works ==
His surviving works relate to Vajrayana Buddhism and were originally written in Sanskrit. These are:

- Mṛtyuvañcanopadeśa, an anthology of rites on how to cheat death once the signs have been spotted. This work was translated into Tibetan by Atisa who knew Vāgīśvarakīrti personally and brought the text with him during his journey to Tibet.
- Saṃkṣiptābhiṣekavidhi, an initiation manual relating to Guhyasamāja Tantra.
- Tattvaratnāvaloka, a 21 verse treatise
- Saptāṅga, a treatise of which the original Sanskrit version has been lost.
