= Shavaripa =

One of the eighty-four Mahasiddhas

Shavaripa (Sanskrit: Śabara) was an Indian Buddhist teacher, one of the eighty-four Mahasiddhas, honored as being among the holders of the distant transmission of Mahamudra. He was a student of Nagarjuna and a teacher of Maitripa. He is one of the forefathers of the Kagyu lineage of Tibetan Buddhism. Shavaripa is loosely related to the goddess Parnashavari and Janguli by relationship of the Shavari tribe of north-east India.

== Books ==
- Dowman, Keith (trans.), Masters of Mahāmudrā: Songs and Histories of the Eighty-Four Buddhist Siddhas. Albany, New York: SUNY Press, 1985.
- English, Elizabeth, Vajrayoginī: Her Visualizations, Rituals and Forms. Boston, Massachusetts: Wisdom Publications, 2002.
- Jampa Thaye (1990). Garland of Gold. UK: Ganesha. p. 128. ISBN 0950911933.
- Kalu Rinpoche (1986). The Dharma that Illuminates All Beings Like the Light of the Sun and the Moon. USA: State University of New York, Albany. ISBN 0-88706-156-7.
- Linrothe, Rob, Holy Madness: Portraits of Tantric Siddhas. Chicago: Serindia Publications, 2006.
- Templeman, David (trans.), The Seven Instruction Lineages by Jo-nang-Tārānātha. Dharamsala: Library of Tibetan Works and Archives, 1983.
- Золотая Гирлянда - ранние учителя Кагью в Индии и Тибете, Лама Джампа Тхайе, Альмазный путь, 48.
