= Prajñakaragupta =

Buddhist philosopher

Prajñākaragupta (also: Prajñakara, Sanskrit, Tibetan: shes rab 'byung gnas sbas pa, ca. 8th–9th century) was a Buddhist philosopher of the Epistemological school. He is known for his extensive magnum opus, the Pramāṇavārttikālaṃkāra (The Ornament of the Commentary on Epistemology), a commentary on Dharmakīrti's Pramāṇavārttika which runs to over 16,200 Sanskrit ślokas. Prajñākaragupta introduced several original innovations to the school of Dharmakīrti, such as the doctrine of backwards causation and a revised theory of perception. According to Eli Franco, Prajñākaragupta is "arguably the most important and most original Buddhist philosopher after Dignāga and Dharmakīrti".

According to the Tibetan historian Tārānātha, Prajñākaragupta was a lay disciple (upāsaka). Since his disciple Ravigupta hailed from Kashmir, some scholars have argued that Prajñākaragupta was also Kashmiri.

Prajñākaragupta influenced later Buddhist thinkers like Ravigupta (9th century), Jayanta (10th century), Jñānaśrīmitra (c. 980–1040), and Yamāri (c. 1000–1060) and was critiqued and commented on by non-buddhist tenth century figures like Bhāsarvajña and Vidyānandin.

== Philosophy ==
Prajñākaragupta's philosophy is found in his extensive Pramāṇavārttikālaṃkāra (henceforth PVA, sometimes also called Pramāṇavārttikabhāṣyam) which survives in a single Sanskrit manuscript. The manuscript was discovered and photographed by Rāhula Sāṅkṛtyāyana. It also survives in a Tibetan translation by Blo ldan śes rab et al. as the Tshad ma rnam 'grel gyi rgyan (Tengyur, Derge edition, Toh 4221).

He also wrote the Sahopalambaniyamasiddhi (Ascertaining the Simultaneity of the Object [and Consciousness]), a proof of Yogacara idealism.

=== Perception and inference ===
Prajñakara's view of the relationship between the two pramāṇas (epistemic instruments which give us knowledge) of perception (Sanskrit: pratyakṣa) and inference (anumana) differs significantly from that of Dharmakīrti. According to Dharmakīrti, only perception is a true pramāṇa, since only perception knows the true form (svarūpa) of the object of cognition. Inference on the other hand, only knows universals, which are conceptual constructs and unreal. However, inference can still be seen as a secondary kind of epistemic instrument, since it can lead a person to accomplish their intention (Pramāṇavārttika 3.56). Thus, since inference has pragmatic efficacy, it can be called a pramāṇa, even if it is a concept that does not know the actual form of the object, and is thus ultimately erroneous.

Prajñākaragupta on the other hand stresses the similarity between perception and inference. Prajñākara argues that due to the principle of momentariness (which says that all phenomena arise and cease in minute moments), perception also faces the same issues that Dharmakīrti levels against inference (i.e. it does not actually know the object itself directly):

Even in the case of perception, how does one act? There too, one does not at all discern the form of the object to be obtained by one’s action (prāptavyarūpa), since one discerns only what is actually present. Indeed, perception itself does not prompt one to act precisely because it only apprehends what is present. Even there [in the case of perception] it is only through a determination of the unity (ekatvādhyavasāya) of that [present object] that one acts with respect to the future object (bhāvivastu). And, in the case of the inferred object too, activity is likewise due to this [determination of unity] – So how can you see them as different? (PVA 216,4–7)

Here, Prajñākara argues that the initial perception of the object is not the object that one directs one's action towards and eventually obtains on the basis of perception. Since all phenomena are momentary, the perception of an object and any subsequent perception of the object one obtains are not the same. Thus, while perception has pragmatic efficacy, just like inference, it is also indirect and based on an error which sees a present perception and a presumed future perception of the object as a single entity, while in reality, there is only an ever changing stream of perceptions. As Lawrence McCrea writes, "in perception as well as inference, there is a radical distinction between the object directly presented to one’s awareness and the object of one’s activity – in both cases, what you see is not what you get."

Prajñākara's view of perception also radically departs from Dharmakīrti in another way. Prajñākara claims that when it comes to perception, the initial non-conceptual awareness that directly presents an object cannot even be considered a pramāṇa, since it does not prompt one to act (pravartaka) pragmatically. The actual pramāṇa in the case of perception is the subsequent conceptual cognition (vikalpa) that immediately follows the initial act of perception. Thus, non-conceptual direct perception can only said to be a pramāṇa indirectly, since it is what prompts one to conceive of an object and then to act. This is quite different from Dharmakīrti's view which sees non-conceptual direct perception as the only real pramāṇa.

Prajñākaragupta also argues that "without inference, perception does not, at first, prompt [a person] to act; likewise inference without perception" (PVA II 244–245). That is to say, inference and perception depend on each other to function. A pure direct perception would never prompt a person to act towards some aim without relying on some kind of inference that makes a connection between that perception and some future thing to be attained. However, there is one case in which a non-conceptual perception without inference is a pramāṇa for Prajñākaragupta, and this is the knowledge of self-awareness (svasamvedana). However, in this ultimate case, there is no pragmatic aim, since there is only the experience of non-duality. As such, this case is not a pramāṇa in the conventional sense.

=== Perceptual diversity ===
The school of Dharmakīrti is known to follow the view of Vijñānavāda which denies the existence of an external world and is thus a kind of idealism that holds that the world is but a chain of cognitions that arise and perish moment by moment. Each cognition is the cause of the next moment of cognition. A problem which arises for this tradition is how to explain the diversity of cognitions if each cognition in the stream of consciousness is the cause of the next (e.g. what causes a cognition of blue to be followed by a cognition of yellow?). To explain this without appealing to an external material world traditional Vijñānavādins posit the existence of latent impressions (vāsanā) which are stored in a subliminal layer of consciousness called the storehouse consciousness (ālayavijñāna).

Prajñākaragupta's account of past experiences differs from previous commentators like Devendrabuddhi. For Prajñākaragupta, all cognitions (conceptual, recollections, or direct experiences) take previous or past cognitions (antaravijñāna) themselves as their object, instead of only potentials (i.e. cognitive seeds) or conceptual constructs. The way this works is that after repeated experiences, the mind is able to manifest a previous direct perception as a clear image (spaṣtākāra) which becomes the object (viṣaya) for a subsequent cognition. This event can be triggered by a previous direct cognition or a conceptual cognition. This fact is the case not just for acts of memory, but for directly experiencing objects in the present as well. That is to say, like with modern theories of Memory-Based Perception, for Prajñākaragupta, all perceptions are directly affected by our past memories and cognitions. Prajñākaragupta writes:

Even in the case of direct experience, the object is not something that is newly presented (anupalabdha) at that time. Rather, it is something that has already been presented (upalabdha) and is being remembered (anusmrta). (PVA 351.5-6)

As such, perceptual diversity is not just caused by past latent impressions (seeds in the storehouse consciousness), but by actual past cognitions which reappear or manifest within consciousness.

=== Backwards causation ===
Prajñākaragupta defends a unique thesis of "future causality" or "backward causation" (bhāvikāraṇavāda) which affirms that future entities can indeed cause present entities. In his defense of this theory, Prajñākaragupta appeals to the doctrine of “following co-presence and co-absence” (anvayavyatirekānuvidhāyitva) as the definition of causality and dependent arising (pratītyasamutpāda). This definition may be described as: “When A is present, B is also present,” and “When A is absent, B is also absent” or “if A, then B”, "if not A, not B". In this formulation (which is described through the Sanskrit locative case in Prajñākara's presentation), there is no implication of any temporal order regarding causality. While some commentators like Devendrabuddhi and Śākyabuddhi did interpret these statements as indicating temporality, Prajñākaragupta did not. Prajñākaragupta instead argued that temporal order is not a necessary element of causality:

If causation is determined merely from the relation in which an entity’s occurrence is brought forth by another entity’s occurrence (tadbhāvabhāvitā), what does it contradict? What is the use of the temporal sequence (pūrvaparabhāva) here? (PVA 69.11, v. 440)

For Prajñākaragupta, once one has established a connection between cause and effect, it is equally true that the cause does not exist, regardless of whether the cause is in the future or the present. Since past and future entities are equally just conceptual constructs which are not presently actual but mental fabrications, both inferences (from past causes or future causes) have the same value. If one accepts that one can infer a cause from something which has already perished in the past and no longer exists, one should also accept the validity inferring backward causation from a future entity that has not yet come into existence. Since time is ultimately unreal for Prajñākaragupta, causality does not have to be limited in its function to only one temporal direction.

Prajñākaragupta gives several examples of backward causation, such as one's pleasant feeling which is influenced by one's future happiness, or omens of death (ariṣṭa) that individuals perceive. Prajñākaragupta also thinks that one can infer the existence of future lives through this argument. Prajñākaragupta theory was later expanded on by Jitāri (ca. 940–1000) in a short text called Treatise on Future Cause (Bhāvikāraṇavāda).

=== Existence is perception ===
Dharmakīrti generally defined the nature of existence as causal efficacy or force (arthakriyā). However, Prajñākaragupta's theory of existence (sattva) relies on some passages in Dharmakīrti which refers to another definition for existence. For Prajñākaragupta this definition is: “existence is perception” or “existence is what is perceptible” (upalambhaḥ sattā). This definition is much more idealistic and is similar to Berkeley's esse is percipi. It can be found in Dharmakīrti's Pramāṇavārttika-svavṛtti (PVSV 4.9–11), which states: "existence is nothing but either perceptibility (upalabdhi) that is characterized by the real entity’s causal capability, or perception (upalabdhi), namely, a cognition’s occurrence based on the entity’s causal capability."

Commentators like Śākyabuddhi had interpreted this passage as defining existence via causal efficacy (in this case, the power to produce a perception). Prajñākaragupta however, rejects the causal account, since he argues that the object and the cognition that knows it are ultimately not different. Instead, he argues that upalabdhi (apprehension, perception, the cognitive "picking up" of something) merely indicates "the state of being perceived" which is "exactly the essence of an object" since "the existence of a perceptible object is conceptually pervaded by its “perception”" (PVA 633.4–8). In this account of existence, Prajñākaragupta relies on the inseparability between an object's existence and the perception that knows it. He denies that we can ultimately separate the two as cause and effect, since an "object" is just something that is already being perceived and all such objects are mind-only. This view is drawing on the argument originally put forth by Dignaga in favor of mind-only idealism (cittamatra) which argues from "the necessity of things only ever being experienced together with experience" (Sanskrit: sahopalambhaniyama). Thus, Prajñākaragupta writes:

The existence defined by perception (upalambha) is indeed the ultimate existence. The ultimate existence of entities is expressed in this way: “Existence is nothing but perception.” (PVA 213.22, v. 230)

In the PVA (112.1–6), Prajñākaragupta also argues for this definition of existence by using the accepted Buddhist fact of the Buddha's omniscience regarding all past, present and future phenomena.

=== Reflexive awareness ===
Prajñākaragupta's theory of existence as perception has two aspects: awareness of an object and reflexive awareness (svasaṃvedana) which knows awareness itself. Actually, Prajñākaragupta ultimately reduces all cognitions to self-aware cognition, as he states in PVA (31.22–23): “The means of valid cognition is only self-awareness as the single type of perception” (svasaṃvedanam evaikaṃ pratyakṣaṃ pramāṇam). Thus, at the ultimate level of philosophical analysis, there is only reflexive awareness and its images. All other cognitions and perceptions are relative and only established at the level of convention (vyavahāra), including Dharmakīrti's analysis of causal force. Ultimately however, only self-awareness exists.

In his Pramāṇavārttikālaṃkāra, Prajñākara also mounts a defense of the theory of self-awareness, which had been explained by previous thinkers through the metaphor of a lamp, which can illuminate a room and also illuminate itself, since as Dharmakirti states, its own essence is illumination (prakāśātmaka). Earlier commentators had explained this passage mostly metaphorically. Devendrabuddhi (c. 7th century) even states that "it is not ultimately self-illuminating". Non-Buddhist and Buddhist thinkers had also criticized this idea, arguing that like a sword cannot cut itself, nothing can act on itself. Prajñākaragupta explains the theory of self-reflexive awareness by arguing that all phenomena arise from conscious luminosity (prakāśa). Thus, for Prajñākaragupta, the very act of illumination is not a case of the mind illuminating something (like a pot) which exists separately. Rather, it is the emergence of the object (a pot etc.) that has illumination as its essence from mind itself.

Furthermore, he argues that there is no contradiction in something having the inherent power to illuminate itself (unlike with the example of the sword):

When the essence of x is y, how can there be any contradiction [between x and y]? Indeed, if there is a contradiction with its own essence, then absolutely everything will collapse. (PVA 353, 32)

Thus, for Prajñākaragupta, the property of self illumination is the very essence (svabhāva) of awareness and it does not and cannot contradict awareness itself (PVA 354, 3), since there is nothing which contradicts its own essence. According to Prājñākaragupta, illumination is the manifestation of the mind's essential property. Thus, it is only conventionally that we speak of a mind illuminating phenomena, in reality, pots and so forth are radiating from mind itself. In other words, though we may say that cognition illuminates itself like a lamp, this is merely a metaphorical expression referring to the luminous essence of consciousness, since there is ultimately no separation between the function of self-illumination (svaprakāśa) and consciousness (vijñapti, vijñana) itself. As such, self-awareness cannot be like the analogy of a sword attempting to cut itself which is used as a counterexample by the opponent. This is because the function of cutting requires another object, while illumination is a non-dualistic experience in which the object illuminated manifests from the cognition which illuminates. Thus, since they share the same essence, there is no contradiction.

=== The wisdom of non-duality ===
At the core of Prajñākaragupta’s thought is the wisdom of non-duality (advaya-jñana) which is the ultimate means of valid cognition (pramāṇa). Dharmakīrti had further defined "pramāṇa" as that which illuminates unknown objects (ajñātārthaprakāśo vā) and as that which is a "knowledge without deception" (avisaṃvādi jñānam). Prajñākaragupta states that "unknown objects" ultimately refers to the ultimate object (paramārtha) which is a non-dual form (advaitarūpatā) (PVA 79,15-17). This non-dual perception (advaita-dṛṣṭi) is what ultimately leads to the end of suffering. Prajñākaragupta identifies it with what Dharmakīrti calls the insight (yukti) that leads to the end of suffering (Pramāṇavārttika chapter II v. 139). Previous commentators had mainly aligned this with not-self. Prajñākaragupta agrees, but also gives an alternative explanation: "yukti is union (yoga), which means that all phenomena are interconnected beyond all differences, that is, non-duality (advaita)" (PVA 116,16-19).

For Prajñākaragupta, all other forms of Buddhist epistemology which do not discuss non-duality are ways to gradually lead a person to higher and subtler levels of wisdom, culminating in the nondual cognition (advaitāvabodha). Dharmakīrti’s system of epistemology had argued that cognition has the nature of "variety-in-non-duality" (citrādvaita) as a way to explain the variety and divisibility of objects of cognition. Prajñākaragupta goes one step further and explains the ultimate nature of non-dual cognition as follows:

There can never exist any distinction in the ultimate sense, so that the distinctions between singular and multiple, and between variegated and unvariegated, are considered untenable.

Prajñākaragupta’s fundamental view of reality as non-dual consciousness is another reason why he thinks that time is fictional and unreal and why backwards causality is possible. Furthermore, Prajñākaragupta’s view of existence as perception is also ultimately based on his view of non-duality, which denies any ultimate distinction between a subject (knower) and the objects known. Even the very distinction between the Buddha as an omniscient being and non-awakened people is abolished in Prajñākaragupta’s non-duality. For Prajñākaragupta, the role of the Buddha as an omniscient being is one which is relative and conventional, and which "occupies its place only in a world of duality that is conceptually constructed by ordinary people who sees themselves as separated from and inferior to the Buddha."

=== Yogic perception and omniscience ===
Since the wisdom of non-duality is the ultimate pramāṇa (epistemology), this means that it is a kind of perception (pratyakṣa), defined as a “cognition that is free of conceptual construction” (kalpanāpoḍha). Specifically, it is a yogic perception (yogipratyakṣa) in which a true object appears in a vivid non-conceptual way after repeated practice (abhyāsa) of meditation and reflection on the teachings. Thus, Prajñākaragupta writes:

[I]t is not the case that one becomes a yogin merely because of meditation. Rather, to those who meditate upon objects after having grasped them through the cognition that arises from listening (śrutamaya) [to the Buddha’s teachings], and after having ascertained them through the cognition that arises from reflecting through rational inquiry (yukticintāmaya), [a cognition] that has a true object arises at the perfection of the meditation. Exactly this cognition is [called here] valid cognition (pramāṇa), and the one who possesses this cognition is called a “yogin.”

Prajñākaragupta understands the omniscience of the Buddha as an extended form of yogic perception which knows all past and future objects as well as present ones in one instantaneous moment. The foundation of this is the knowledge which knows cause and effect and dependent origination (pratītyasamutpāda).

=== Sākāravāda and sahopalambhaniyama ===
Prajñākaragupta’s view of non-duality is also a type of "Sākāravāda" ("with images" view), a view which affirms that images, appearances or mental aspects (ākāra) exist as manifestations of the ultimate self-reflexive consciousness. This view is contrasted with the "Nirākāravāda" view which holds that the ultimate non-dual consciousness is a content-less pure experience without any images or appearances. According to Prajñākaragupta, the Sākāravāda view is a consequence of Dignaga's classic proof of idealism from "the necessity of things only ever being experienced together with experience" (sahopalambhaniyama).

Prajñākaragupta proof of sahopalambhaniyama goes as follows:

Blue and (its) consciousness are actually one because it is not (possible for one) to exist (anvaya), (while the other is) absent (at the same time) (vyatireka), as they are not experienced as separate from each other (PVA p. 410, 22)

The core of the argument relies on the property of indistinguishability (aśakyavivecanatva), which applies to consciousness and its image. According to Prajñākaragupta, the self-awareness of an object A, whether it be blue or pleasure, always bears the form of A, and all objects of cognition have "the nature of immediate perception (aparokṣarūpatva), identical with experience (anubhavātmaka)" (PVA p. 402, 1). For Prajñakara, the fact that consciousness and the object of consciousness is never perceived separately means that it is impossible to discriminate them (viveka) as two independent existences. This is used as a proof of idealism and to show that the subject-object distinction is a mere conceptual construct. Furthermore, Prajñakara goes further than Dharmakirti and the commentator Dharmottara in asserting the unity (ekatva) of the object and consciousness (not merely denying their inseparability). Dharmottara had argued that the "non-difference between the object and its cognition" negates their distinctiveness but also their identity, interpreting it as "solely the negation of distinction" (bhedapratibheda-mātra). However, Prajñakara argues that the impossibility of differentiation between them implies that they are identical. Prajñakara's understanding of non-duality is thus based on the ultimate unity of all objects and self-awareness. In this view, a cognition of blue does not arise because blue exists independently of conscious appearance (pratibhāsa) or luminosity (prakāśa), but because all images are encompassed within conscious appearance. As Prajñākaragupta writes:

From the standpoint of the highest truth, nothing shines that is not luminosity...Also, the object shines due to its nature (prakāśa (ka) rūpeṇa); it is not illuminated by anything else (PVA p. 448, 6-8).

Indeed, for Prajñākaragupta, the apprehension (aparokṣatā) of a cognitive object and the ultimate reality of conscious manifestation or illumination (prakāśa, lit. "shining forth") are identical. In other words, perception is ultimately unified. According to Prajñākara, if consciousness exists without images or forms, then it cannot perceive the sensations (vedana) related to specific objects. In this case, consciousness would remain unchanged no matter which object it was aware of and one could never distinguish between different specific objects. In his view, it is not the case that perception is a dualistic process in which a consciousness knows an object outside of itself. Rather, what is perceived is the manifestation or appearance of forms within consciousness itself. If we completely separate the object from the manifestation of consciousness (prakāśa), the object would never be perceived. Thus, for Prajñākaragupta, a consequence of the complete identity of object and cognition which was established in the sahopalambhaniyama argument is that the object does not become ultimately non-existent (as in the alternative Nirākāravāda position), but retains its existence as a form or manifestation of cognition.

=== Diverse non-duality (citrādvaita) ===
In Prajñākara's view, the ultimate reality is a variegated non-duality (citrādvaita) in which images or forms (akāras) are present in a non-dual unified self-awareness, though it is mistakenly conceived of as a duality (PVA p. 410, 6-7). This is based on the same principle of unity relied upon in the previous argument from indistinguishability. Prajñākaragupta's proof of Sākāravāda runs as follows:

The unity of the object with (its) cognition is apparent because they share a common fate (abhinnayogakṣematva), barely separating...hence it is proven that cognition is endowed with a form (sākāraṃ vijñānam) (PVA p. 410, 32).

According to the alternative doctrine of cognition without form which Prajñākara rejects, if cognition is totally content-less at each moment even as it knows various forms, this contradicts the unity of cognition and its objects established in the sahopalambhaniyama argument. But, since our direct perceptions experience many appearances, and these appearances are indistinguishable (and identical) with consciousness, then consciousness must be endowed with images or forms (sākāra). Thus, while cognition and self-awareness are manifold in appearance, it is ultimately a non-dual unity that lacks discrimination or conceptualization:

Even though cognition possesses various aspects like pleasure and blue, etc., it can be recognized as having variety which is [however] not divided into different entities in self-awareness (svasamvedana). (PVA. 410,3-4).

This view draws and expands on the theory of diversified non-duality (citrādvaita) which was proposed by Dharmakīrti in order to explain how diversity is perceived simultaneously by the mind as a single unified direct perception. Prajñakara adopts this theory and argues that because the awareness or knowledge of diverse forms in a single moment of perception cannot be perceived independently or isolated from each other (kevala), variegated acts of perception must always be singular (ekataiva) (PVA.289,26-27). This argument is structurally similar to the theory of simultaneous perception of objects and knowledge (sahopalambhaniyama), in that both rely on the inability to separate or discriminate the contents of experience or to know them independently of each other.

=== Other minds ===
Prajñākaragupta's discussion of Dharmakīrti's inference for establishing the existence of other minds has some similarities with that of the later figure Ratnakirti in that both thinkers do not think one can ultimately establish the existence of other minds.

== See also ==
- Retrocausality
- Idealism
- Buddhist logico-epistemology
- Epistemology
