= Retrocausality =

Mathematical technique in physics

Retrocausality, or backwards causation, is a concept of cause and effect in which an effect precedes its cause in time and so a later event affects an earlier one. In quantum physics, the distinction between cause and effect is not made at the most fundamental level and so time-symmetric systems can be viewed as causal or retrocausal. Philosophical considerations of time travel often address the same issues as retrocausality, as do treatments of the subject in fiction, but the two phenomena are distinct.

== Philosophy ==
Philosophical efforts to understand causality extend back at least to Aristotle's discussions of the four causes. It was long considered that an effect preceding its cause is an inherent self-contradiction because, as 18th century philosopher David Hume discussed, when examining two related events, the cause is by definition the one that precedes the effect.

The idea of retrocausality is also found in Indian philosophy. It was defended by at least two Indian Buddhist philosophers, Prajñākaragupta (ca. 8th–9th century) and Jitāri (ca. 940–1000); the latter wrote a specific treatise on the topic, the Treatise on Future Cause (Bhāvikāraṇavāda). The idea is also found in some Chinese Buddhist philosophers, like Fazang.

In the 1950s, Michael Dummett wrote in opposition to such definitions, stating that there was no philosophical objection to effects preceding their causes. This argument was rebutted by fellow philosopher Antony Flew and, later, by Max Black. Black's "bilking argument" held that retrocausality is impossible because the observer of an effect could act to prevent its future cause from ever occurring. A more complex discussion of how free will relates to the issues Black raised is summarized by Newcomb's paradox. Essentialist philosophers have proposed other theories, such as the existence of "genuine causal powers in nature" or by raising concerns about the role of induction in theories of causality.

== Physics ==
Most physical theories are time symmetric: microscopic models like Newton's laws or electromagnetism have no inherent direction of time. The "arrow of time" that distinguishes cause and effect must have another origin. To reduce confusion, physicists distinguish strong (macroscopic) from weak (microscopic) causality.

=== Macroscopic causality ===
The imaginary ability to affect the past is sometimes taken to suggest that causes could be negated by their own effects, creating a logical contradiction such as the grandfather paradox. This contradiction is not necessarily inherent to retrocausality or time travel; by limiting the initial conditions of time travel with consistency constraints, such paradoxes and others are avoided.

Aspects of modern physics, such as the hypothetical tachyon particle and certain time-independent aspects of quantum mechanics, may allow particles or information to travel backward in time. Logical objections to macroscopic time travel may not necessarily prevent retrocausality at other scales of interaction. Even if such effects are possible, however, they may not be capable of producing effects different from those that would have resulted from normal causal relationships.

Physicist John G. Cramer has explored various proposed methods for nonlocal or retrocausal quantum communication and found them all flawed and, consistent with the no-communication theorem, unable to transmit nonlocal signals.

==== Relativity ====
"In relativity, time and space are intertwined in the fabric of space-time, so time can contract and stretch under the influence of gravity." Closed timelike curves (CTCs), sometimes referred to as time loops, in which the world line of an object returns to its origin, arise from some exact solutions to the Einstein field equation. However, the chronology protection conjecture of Stephen Hawking suggests that any such closed timelike curve would be destroyed before it could be used. Although CTCs do not appear to exist under normal conditions, extreme environments of spacetime, such as a traversable wormhole or the region near certain cosmic strings, may allow their brief formation, implying a theoretical possibility of retrocausality. The exotic matter or topological defects required for the creation of those environments have not been observed.

=== Microscopic causality ===
Most physical models are time symmetric; some use retrocausality at the microscopic level.

==== Electromagnetism ====
Wheeler–Feynman absorber theory, proposed by John Archibald Wheeler and Richard Feynman, uses retrocausality and a temporal form of destructive interference to explain the absence of a type of converging concentric wave suggested by certain solutions to Maxwell's equations. These advanced waves have nothing to do with cause and effect: they are simply a different mathematical way to describe normal waves. The reason they were proposed is that a charged particle would not have to act on itself, which, in normal classical electromagnetism, leads to an infinite self-force.

==== Quantum physics ====
Time runs left to right in this Feynman diagram of electron–positron annihilation. When interpreted to include retrocausality, the electron (marked e^{−}) was not destroyed, instead becoming the positron (e^{+}) and moving backward in time.

Ernst Stueckelberg, and later Richard Feynman, proposed an interpretation of the positron as an electron moving backward in time, reinterpreting the negative-energy solutions of the Dirac equation. This is called the Stückelberg interpretation. Electrons moving backward in time would have a positive electric charge according to this interpretation. This time-reversal of anti-particles is required in modern quantum field theory, and is for example a component of how nucleons in atoms are held together with the nuclear force, via exchange of virtual mesons such as the pion. A meson is made up by an equal number of normal quarks and anti-quarks, and is thus simultaneously both emitted and absorbed.

Wheeler invoked this time-reversal concept to explain the identical properties shared by all electrons, suggesting that "they are all the same electron" with a complex, self-intersecting world line. Yoichiro Nambu later applied it to all production and annihilation of particle-antiparticle pairs, stating that "the eventual creation and annihilation of pairs that may occur now and then is no creation or annihilation, but only a change of direction of moving particles, from past to future, or from future to past." The backwards-in-time point of view is nowadays accepted as completely equivalent to other pictures, but it has nothing to do with the macroscopic terms "cause" and "effect", which do not appear in a microscopic physical description.

Retrocausality is associated with the Double Inferential state-Vector Formalism (DIVF), later known as the two-state vector formalism (TSVF) in quantum mechanics, where the present is characterised by quantum states of the past and the future taken in combination.

Retrocausality is sometimes associated with nonlocal correlations that generically arise from quantum entanglement, including for example the delayed choice quantum eraser. However accounts of quantum entanglement can be given which do not involve retrocausality. They treat the experiments demonstrating these correlations as being described from different reference frames that disagree on which measurement is a "cause" versus an "effect", as necessary to be consistent with special relativity. That is to say, the choice of which event is the cause and which the effect is not absolute but is relative to the observer. The description of such nonlocal quantum entanglements can be described in a way that is free of retrocausality if the states of the system are considered.

Tachyon visualization: since a tachyon moves faster than the speed of light, we can not see it approaching. After a tachyon has passed nearby, we would be able to see two images of it, appearing and departing in opposite directions. The black line is the shock wave of Cherenkov radiation, shown only in one moment of time.

==== Tachyons ====
Hypothetical superluminal particles called tachyons have a spacelike trajectory, and thus can appear to move backward in time, according to an observer in a conventional reference frame. Despite frequent depiction in science fiction as a method to send messages back in time, hypothetical tachyons do not interact with normal tardyonic matter in a way that would violate standard causality. Specifically, the Feinberg reinterpretation principle means that ordinary matter cannot be used to make a tachyon detector capable of receiving information.

== Parapsychology ==
Retrocausality is claimed to occur in some psychic phenomena such as precognition. J. W. Dunne's 1927 book An Experiment with Time studied precognitive dreams and has become a definitive classic. Parapsychologist J. B. Rhine and colleagues made intensive investigations during the mid-twentieth century. His successor Helmut Schmidt presented quantum mechanical justifications for retrocausality, eventually claiming that experiments had demonstrated the ability to manipulate radioactive decay through retrocausal psychokinesis. Such results and their underlying theories have been rejected by the mainstream scientific community and are widely accepted as pseudoscience, although they continue to have some support from fringe science sources.

Efforts to associate retrocausality with prayer healing have been similarly rejected.

From 1994, psychologist Daryl J. Bem has argued for precognition. He subsequently showed experimental subjects two sets of curtains and instructed them to guess which one had a picture behind it, but did not display the picture behind the curtain until after the subject made their guess. Some results showed a higher margin of success (p. 17) for a subset of erotic images, with subjects who identified as "stimulus-seeking" in the pre-screening questionnaire scoring even higher. However, like his predecessors, his methodology has been strongly criticised and his results discounted.

== See also ==
- Advanced potential – Type of potential in electrodynamics
- T-symmetry – Time reversal symmetry in physics
- Reversal of temporal order judgment – Perception of events' position in time
- Transactional interpretation – Interpretation of quantum mechanics
- Time's Arrow and Archimedes' Point – Book about retrocausality and philosophical issues in quantum mechanics
- Zeno effect – Quantum measurement phenomenon
