= Ratnākaraśānti =

Buddhist philosopher

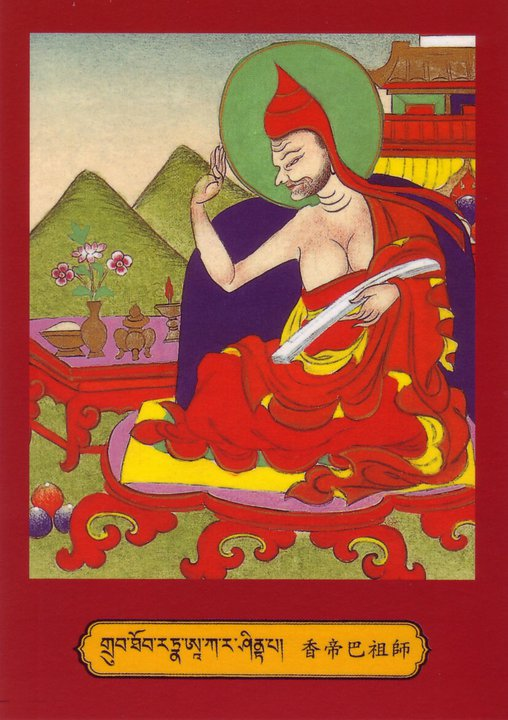
- A Tibetan illustration of Ratnākaraśānti as a scholar.

Personal life
- Born: Late 10th century CE Magadha
- Died: Mid 11th century CE
- Education: Vikramashila; Odantapuri

Religious life
- Religion: Buddhism
- School: Vajrayana; Mahayana

Ratnākaraśānti (also known as Ratnākara, Śāntipa, and Śānti) (late 10th-century CE to mid 11th-century CE) was an influential Buddhist philosopher and vajrayana tantric adept and scholar. He was the "gate scholar" of Vikramaśilā university's eastern gate (modern-day Bihar in India), a key post in the university's leadership. Ratnākara was known by the title kalikālasarvajña ("the Omniscient One of the Degenerate Age") and is depicted as one of the eighty-four mahāsiddhas (great yogic masters).

Ratnākara wrote over forty works which include several influential commentaries to Mahayana sutras and tantras (especially the Hevajra tantra), treatises on Yogācāra, Madhyamaka, and Pramāṇa. Because his unique philosophy attempts to merge the insights of both Yogācāra and Madhyamaka, Ratnākara referred to it as Trisvabhāva-mādhyamaka ("the middle way of the three natures"). He also known as a major defender of the "nirākāravāda" (without images") interpretation of Yogācāra.

At Vikramaśilā, Ratnākara was a teacher to Atīśa, Maitrīpa, Drokmi Śākya Yeshe among others. He was also a contemporary of Vāgīśvarakīrti. Ratnākaraśānti was influential on some Tibetan Buddhist figures. Defenders of the shentong view him as a forerunner of this tradition and as a defender of shentong. His work on the Hevajra Tantra was also influential.

== Life ==
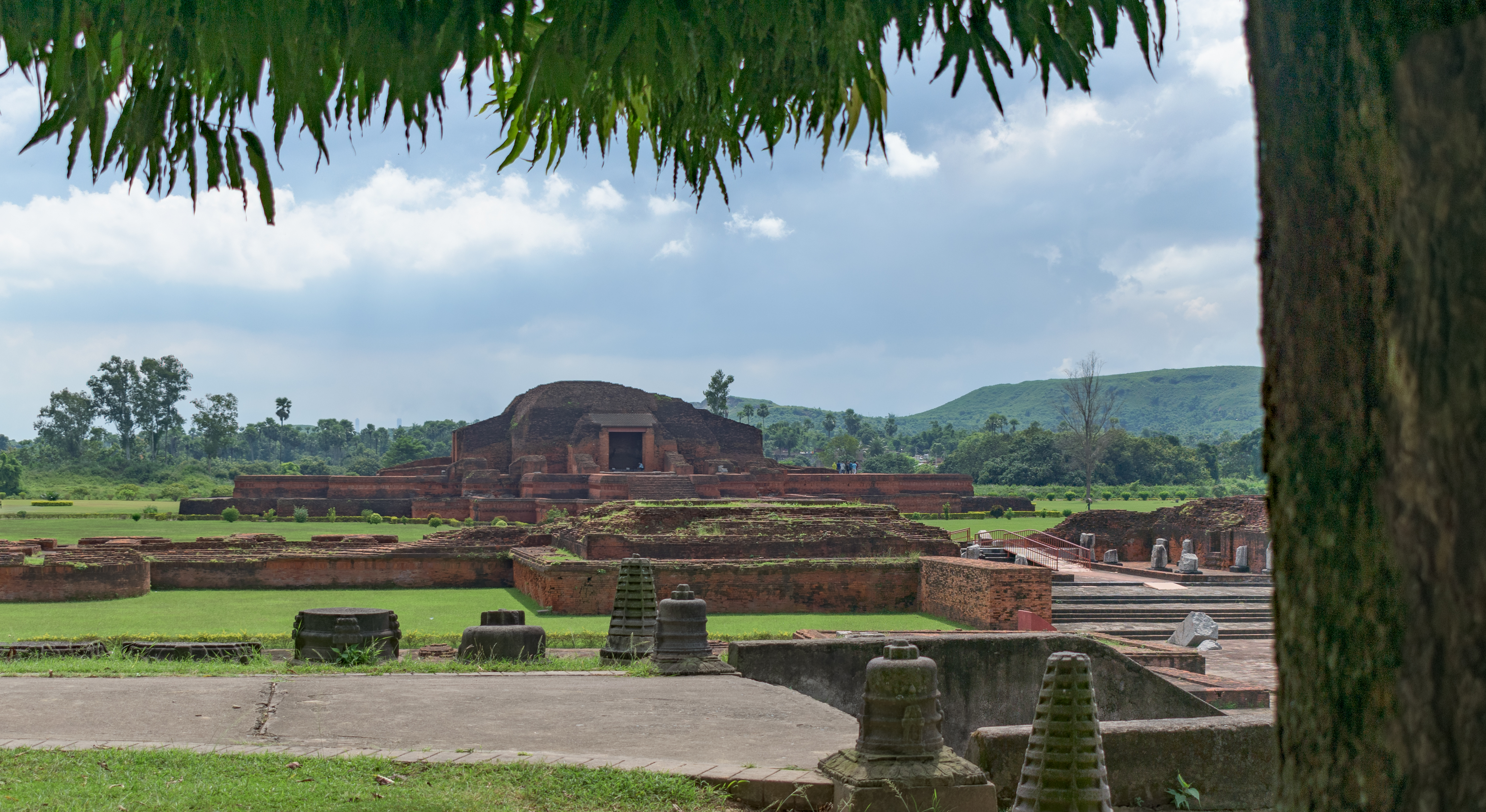
Panorama of Vikramaśīla monastery, modern day Bhagalpur district, Bihar.

There is much uncertainty about the facts of Ratnākaraśānti's life since Tibetan and Sanskrit sources disagree on many issues. Many sources refer to him as a "pūrvadeśīya" born in Magadha (modern-day Bihar in India).

Abhayadatta Sri places him during the reign of the Pāla king Devapāla (c. 810-850 CE). However, modern scholars have now determined that the most likely dating for Ratnākaraśānti's birth (based on philological, philosophical and biographical evidence) is in the late tenth century, "slightly before Jñānaśrīmitra, Ratnakīrti, and Atiśa." Tāranātha says that he took his post at Vikramaśīla during the reign of King Canaka (active in the early 11th century).

Naktso Lotsāwa Tsultrim Gyelwa, a Tibetan student of Ratnākaraśānti, states that Ratnākaraśānti was a student of *Dharmakīrtiśrī (a.k.a. Bla ma Gser ling pa, *Dharmakīrti of Suvarṇadvīpa). Tibetan sources also state he was a student of Nāropa, though it is hard to say how reliable this claim is as many of these sources are unreliable historically.

In the early stages of his career, Ratnākaraśānti received his ordination at the monastery of Odantapuri. He seems to have gained much fame and status during the middle of his life when he became acting head of Vikramaśīla and attracted many offers to teach abroad and this allowed him to secure many donations for the upkeep of Vikramaśīla. Several sources mention that Ratnākaraśānti lived long and was still at Vikramaśīla when Adhīśa (Atisha) when to Tibet in 1041. Sources seem to indicate that he died sometime before 1050 CE.

== Thought ==
=== Nirākāravāda ===
Ratnākaraśānti is perhaps best known for representing the Nirākāravāda view in the debates between the Nirākāravāda and Sākāravāda positions within Yogācāra philosophy. This debate concerned the question of the status of mental images (ākāra). Both factions agreed in their denial of an external world apart from consciousness. That is, for both sides, the appearance of the external world is just an image within consciousness. However, where the Sākāravādins maintained that the images showing up within cognition are real, since they are not different from the ultimately real consciousness, the Nirākāravādins argued that reality is ultimately free of images, as images are constructed by ignorance and therefore false. Thus, according to the Nirākāravāda, only primordial mind as self-cognition exists.

While both factions inherited Dharmakīrti's assertion of a tādātmya (identity) relation between appearance and consciousness, they differed in their understanding of it. For the Sākāravādin, consciousness and images are identical and any conscious experience necessarily has an image. According to the Sākāravādin, for example, in the experience of a patch of blue, there is no consciousness apart from blue: there is just blue-consciousness. On the other hand, Ratnākaraśānti argues that the tādātmya relation simply means that appearances are grounded in consciousness, existing in virtue of it, but it does not follow from this that consciousness exists in virtue of appearance. For Ratnākaraśānti, the relationship is therefore asymmetrical: while consciousness and appearance are non-distinct in some sense, they are not identical in every respect. Davey Tomlinson describes this as a "compositional identity," giving the example of a statue and a lump of clay: in the same way that the statue is composed of clay, images have luminous awareness as their compositional identity. But just as the clay is not identical to the statue in every respect (for example, the statue may be destroyed by mushing, but not the clay), so too luminosity and images are not entirely identical, and what is the case for one is not necessarily so for the other.

With this view, Ratnākaraśānti maintained that opposing properties such as being false and being real may be predicated of one and the same thing, such that an appearance is false but the luminous awareness out of which it is composed is real. As such, Ratnākaraśānti argued against Mādhyamikas such as Śāntarakṣita who maintained that, since appearances do not withstand the neither-one-nor-many argument, and are therefore false, so too must luminosity be false if appearances and luminosity are not distinct. While Ratnākaraśānti agrees with the Mādhyamika that images do not withstand the neither-one-nor-many argument, it does not follow for him that luminosity is thereby also false. At the same time, Ratnākaraśānti argues against the Sākāravādin who maintains that appearances and luminosity, being identical, both withstand the neither-one-nor-many argument and are therefore both real. While Ratnākaraśānti agrees with the Sākāravādin that luminosity is real, it does not follow for him that appearance is also real.

Sākāravādins such as Jñānaśrīmitra argued that the manifestation of something unreal to consciousness was incoherent: since consciousness is real, whatever is manifest to it, being identical to that consciousness, must also be real. In response to this view, Ratnākaraśānti gives the counterexample of generic properties or universals, which all Buddhists take to be false. Generic properties, such as "cow-ness" (gotva) for instance, are agreed by all parties to be products of ignorance and habituation. But while the generic property is false, it is nonetheless undeniably luminous and shows up in awareness. Ratnākaraśānti points out that no self-respecting Buddhist would argue that a generic property is real just because it has this compositional identity with awareness. Ratnākaraśānti then extends this argument to appearances, such as blue: in the same way that generic properties show up in awareness without being real thereby, blue may have a compositional identity with awareness without being real.

For Ratnākaraśānti, when we think we are seeing blue, there is something real that is seen, namely awareness itself. According to Ratnākaraśānti, this self-awareness cannot be refuted, as he states, "Because it is a direct perception, because there is nothing superior, and because it is not imputed, self-awareness—which is the nature of cognition—is not harmed, [but] blue and so forth are refuted." In this way, awareness is thus the dependent nature (paratantrasvabhāva), which is neither a convention nor an imputation. However, while real, Daniel McNamara explains that for Ratnākaraśānti, "Due to karmic distortions, the dependent nature manifests in an impure manner as the imagination of the unreal (abhūtaparikalpa)—specifically, even though we are seeing awareness, its presentation is distorted by karma such that awareness seems like 'blue.'" At the same time, for Ratnākaraśānti, even while the defiled aspect arises and dissolves, the basis also has a pure aspect which remains. According to Luo, "For Ratnākaraśānti, the imagination of the unreal is a duality in which two rūpas [forms] manifest: clear light (prakāśa), the perfect rūpa, and a mental image (ākāra), the imagined one."

Moriyama observes that for Ratnākaraśānti the relationship between cognition and images is one of bhedābheda (difference and non-difference), similar to colors appearing in a mirror: the colors are neither identical to the mirror itself nor different from it.

=== Yogācāra and Madhyamaka ===
While being a Yogācāra philosopher who defended the nirākāravāda ("without images", also known as alikākāravāda) view of Yogācāra, Ratnākaraśānti also argued for the compatibility of Madhyamaka with this Yogācāra view. His works, like the Prajñāpāramitopadeśa, state that the Yogācāra and Madhyamaka schools are congruent, having the same ultimate intent and final realisation, even if they describe it somewhat differently.

Due to his unique doctrinal view, which draws on both Yogācāra and Madhyamaka, Tibetan authors like Taranatha labelled Ratnākara's position "Vijñapti-madhyamaka" (rNam rig gi dbu ma). Modern scholars have also described his position with other terms including just "nirākāravāda", "nirākāravāda yogācāra-mādhyamika" and trisvabhāva-mādhyamika. H. Luo notes that various texts by Ratnākara show that he associated his view with the term "Rang bzhin gsum gyi dbu ma pa" which can be reconstructed in Sanskrit as *Trisvabhāva-mādhyamika ("the middle way of the three natures"). The term indicates that he saw himself as a follower of Nagarjuna's mādhyamaka thought who also defended the yogacara school's doctrine of the three natures (trisvabhāva).

Ratnākaraśānti's Prajñāpāramitopadeśa states:

The Yogacaras and likewise the Madhyamikas assert that the fourth [and final] yogabhumi consists of the supramundane wisdom that is absolute without stains and infinite, appearing like space, and in which, by emptiness, all phenomena are not observable and do not appear at all...the Yogacaras assert that the fundamental nature of phenomena - sheer lucidity - exists substantially, while the Madhyamikas do not even assert such a substance. However, this difference is understood as [being one in] name only. Therefore, those Yogacaras and Madhyamikas who dispute with each other without any basis [to do so] are persons of very bad character.

According to Ratnākara, true Mādhyamikas cannot ultimately deny reflexive awareness (Sanskrit: svasaṃvedana or svasaṃvitti). Those who deny this undermine the very epistemic force (pramāṇa) of their system and their own negative arguments. This is because for Ratnākara to be able to logically refute anything there must be a foundation for one's epistemology. Thus, Ratnākara argues that as long as Mādhyamikas accept reflexive awareness as a real foundation, their intent is equal to that of nirākāravāda Yogācāra.

Ratnākara called those Madhyamikas who denied the real existence of reflexive awareness “pseudo-Mādhyamikas” (Tibetan: dbu ma’i ltar snang, *madhyamakābhāsa) and he states that they fail to understand Nāgārjuna’s true intent, which he sees as fully consistent with the Madhyāntavibhāga and Dharmakīrti’s Pramāṇavārttika. Ratnākara's main critique is against Śāntarakṣita, whom he cites and attempts to refute in the Madhyamakālaṃkāravṛtti madhyamāpratipad-siddhi (Proving the Middle Path: A Commentary that Ornaments Madhyamaka).

Śāntarakṣita's Madhyamakālaṃkā accepts the Yogācāra analysis of things at the conventional level, but he sees it as a view which must be superseded by Madhyamaka's anti-foundationalism at the level of ultimate truth. This is because Śāntarakṣita thinks that the dependent nature, the Yogācāra explanation of the ultimate reality, cannot be defended as being either a single thing or as manifold (and thus, it cannot be ultimately real).

According to Daniel McNamara, Ratnākaraśānti criticises this view, holding that "there must be a substratum—the other-dependent nature—and that this does indeed survive the neither-one nor-many argument." Ratnākaraśānti argues that Śāntarakṣita's position is untenable epistemically (since there would be no foundation for pramāṇas and thus, for knowledge) and metaphysically (since pure negation cannot explain dependent arising and causality). Ratnākaraśānti states:

Now, some do not accept that the imagination of the unreal exists; they posit that everything is false. To them, we respond: If [everything] were just false, there would be no cause and no regularity. There would be no causal capacity, only error. Every kind of pramāṇa would be impossible. If everything were false, there would be no causes, so [everything] would arise causelessly. They would also not arise only on particular occasions (re ’ga’). [As Dharmakīrti states, in Pramanavarttika 1.35ab]: Since that which is causeless does not depend on anything else, it would be either permanently existent or permanently nonexistent. There would be no causal capacity because capacity is defined in terms of existence; it is not possible for something non-existent to have causal capacity, The [view that] everything is only error would be attained because what is manifest is non-existent. It would then absurdly follow that the āryas, who do not [see] delusory things, would not see [anything]. Moreover, if everything were an error, there would be no valid direct perception or inference, and so everything without exception would be non-pramāṇa.

Thus, according to Ratnākara, "pseudo-Madhyamikas" undermine their own arguments when they reject a foundation like the dependent nature. For Ratnākara, without some ultimate reference point which really exists, one cannot establish the truth of anything via epistemology - including basic Buddhist theories like dependent arising.

=== The three natures ===
Ratnākaraśānti defends the importance of the Yogācāra three natures theory for Mahayana Buddhism and for understanding the ultimate truth. Following closely the Madhyāntavibhāga and the Triṃśikā, Ratnākaraśānti maintains that the perfected or consummate nature (pariniṣpanna svabhava) is the dependent (paratantra) nature's emptiness of the imagined (parikalpita) nature.

Ratnākaraśānti summarises his interpretation of the three natures theory and how it relates to the two truths theory of Madhyamaka in the following verse (found in his Madhyamakālaṅkāropadeśa and in his Madhyamakālaṅkāravṛtti madhyama pratipatsiddhi):

Every dharma which has as its nature the two, [i.e., the apprehended and the apprehending,] does not exist; [every dharma which] has as its nature the error as being two, [however,] exists; [every dharma which has] as its nature the emptiness of [the two also exists]. That is accepted as the Middle Way. The three natures are named the Imagined, the Dependent, and the Consummate, because, thus in sequence, the Imagined is superimposed as an error, the Dependent arises from the causes, the Consummate is changeless.

In this way, Ratnākaraśānti seeks to provide a theory of the middle way which unites the two main Indian Mahayana schools at the time. In this view, the consummate nature is seen as ultimate and changeless, while the other two natures are relative truth. The Madhyamakālaṅkāravṛtti madhyama pratipatsiddhi further explains why the three natures are the madhyamaka middle way:

To say “[All dharmas] exist” is one extreme, to say “[All dharmas] do not exist” is another extreme. The middle of these two is the Middle Way, which is the definitive realization of the [three] natures. What, then, is that [definitive realization]? That which [asserts]: All dharmas are neither existent nor non-existent, that is to say, from the perspective of the Imagined, [all dharmas] are not existent, from the perspective of the Dependent and the Consummate, they are not nonexistent.

According to H. Luo, Ratnākaraśānti's understanding of Madhyamaka is similar to later Tibetan views described as shentong, such as the view of Sakya Chokden.

=== Emptiness and the three natures ===
According to Karl Brunnholzl, there are two models of the three natures and their relationship to emptiness found in Indian sources:

1. The common model found in most Yogacara sources (such as the works of Asanga and Vasubandhu) is that the dependent nature is empty of the imagined nature, and this very emptiness is the perfected nature.
2. The second model, which is found in Prajñaparamita commentaries like the Bṛhaṭṭīkā and the Āmnāyānusāriṇī, is that the perfected nature is empty of both the dependent and the imagined natures.

Brunnholzl argues that Ratnākaraśānti defends model one in all texts except the Sutrasamuccaya-bhasya (which is a questionable text).

However, Hong Luo disagrees with this view and instead argues that model 2 (together with model 1) can be found in Prajñāpāramitopadeśa, Madhyamakālaṅkāropadeśa and in the Madhyamakālaṅkāravṛtti.

Luo quotes the Prajñāpāramitopadeśa which states:

Therefore, all factors are mere mind (cittamātram), mere cognition (vijñānamātram), mere luminosity (prakāśamātram). There is neither external object-referent to be apprehended by cognition nor the apprehending nature of the cognition. These two, [i.e., the apprehended and the apprehending,] are the Imagined of the factors, because they are fabricated by mental speech. Where are they fabricated? In the imagination of the unreal, [which] arises through the strength of the impregnation of the attachment to the Imagined, [and which] contains the image of an object-referent despite the non-existence of object-referent. The imagination of the unreal is the Dependent of the factors, [it is] an error (bhrāntiḥ), a perverseness (viparyāsaḥ), a false cognition (mithyājñānam). Thus, in the [imagination of the unreal], the image of the apprehending as well as the image of the apprehended are indeed unreal. By the power of confusion (viplavavaśāt), [which arises] only through the strength of error (bhrāntivaśāt), the imagination of the unreal manifests. Therefore, the form (rūpam) of the [imagination of the unreal] is unreal. What is the real? [It is] mere luminosity.

Furthermore, the Madhyamakālaṅkāropadeśa also argues that only the consummate/perfected nature is true: "there is nothing which establishes luminosity, because it is undifferentiated, and because, [otherwise,] there will be an undesirable infinite regress. Thus, since luminosity as such cannot be erroneous to itself, it is valid knowledge." The text then states that the other two natures "like hairs in the sky, are erroneous."

Thus, for Ratnākara, what is truly real is luminosity (prakāśa), the perfected nature, also termed Suchness (tathatā), and the transcendent wisdom of a buddha, which is empty of the imagined and the dependent natures and is always without change.

=== The ultimate reality ===
Ratnākaraśānti also held that ultimate reality is an implicative negation, which is the natural luminosity (prakrti-prabhasvara) and the tathagatagarbha (i.e. buddha-nature) which is also non-dual self-awareness (svasamvedana). This non-dual self-awareness is what remains after all afflictive and cognitive obscurations and duality have been removed.

In the Madhyamakālaṃkāravṛtti madhyamāpratipad-siddhi, Ratnākaraśānti encapsulates his view of the ultimate reality as follows: "Those dharmas—which do not exist—appear Not from matter, nor from what is other, Nor from non-existence, because of two faults. Therefore, their identity is awareness." He comments that the dharmas, the apparent relative phenomena, are not truly existent since they are non-dual, "they lack a nature which is singular or multiple." They do not arise from matter "because appearances are established through awareness alone", nor from something other than awareness, "because phenomena could not manifest in a field of experience from which they are separate." Thus, the only real thing is "the true nature of awareness itself, that is falsely apprehended as appearances."

This ultimate reality is also described as having the nature of radiance (prakāśa, ‘shining forth’), which is the true nature of all phenomena. In the Prajñāpāramitopadeśa, Ratnakara says that all dharmas which appear must have radiance (prakāśa), which is the capacity to appear (pratibhāsa), as their self-nature (ātmabhūtaḥ). Without this capacity for shining forth that consciousness has, nothing could appear to consciousness.

=== Buddha nature ===
Ratnākara mentions buddha-nature in his *Guhyasamāja-maṇḍalavidhi-ṭīkā. He describes buddha-nature as the five kinds of Buddha wisdom (such as ādarśajñāna, mirror-like wisdom, and the rest) which are completely pure, abide in sentient beings "forever, throughout beginningless and endless time", and are merely veiled by adventitious stains but always remain unchanged.

Ratnākara calls the buddha-nature the seed of a Bodhisattva (*bodhisattvabīja), and the “spiritual disposition” of a Buddha, or the Tathāgata-family (tathāgatagotra). Thus, Ratnākara argues that only some sentient beings have buddha-nature, mainly, those who have the disposition (gotra) to become bodhisattvas (but not sravakas or pratyekabuddhas). This is why he says in his Muktāvalī that "all bodhisattvas are Buddha-nature (tathāgatagarbha)".

=== Buddhahood ===
According to Ratnākaraśānti, Buddhahood is the merging of a transcendent awareness with a pure mundane awareness (which is ultimately free of ākāras - representations). Out of their great compassion, all Buddhas deliberately retain a tiny amount of cognitive distortion or mistakenness (bhrānti), so that they interact with and aid sentient beings.

== Works ==
There are about 40 texts attributed to Ratnākaraśānti in the Tibetan canon.

His philosophical works, generally written from a Yogācāra alikākāravāda perspective, include several commentaries to the Perfection of Wisdom literature. Three key works stand out:

- Sāratamāpañjikā
- Śuddhimatī (D 3801)
- Pith Instructions for the Perfection of Wisdom (D 4079, Prajñāpāramitābhāvanopadeśa).

He also wrote three doxographical texts (two of which are commentaries to Śāntarakṣita's Madhyamākalaṃkāra):

- *Vijñaptimātratāsiddhi (D 4259),
- *Madhyamapratipadāsiddhi-nāma-Madhyamakālaṃkāravṛtti (D 4072)
- Madhyamākalaṃkāraopadeśa (D 4085)

He is often critical of the viewpoints of Madhyamikas, including Candrakīrti and Śāntarakṣita.

Ratnākaraśānti composed three commentaries to the Guhyasamāja Tantra, as well as commentaries to the Hevajra Tantra and the Mahāmāyā Tantra. His three main tantric texts are:

- Muktāvalīpañjikā (D 1189), a commentary on the Hevajratantra
- Bhramaharasādhana (D 1245)
- Hevajrasahajasadyoga (D 1246)

He also wrote Kusumāñjalīnāma Guhyasamājanibandha, a commentary on the Guhyasamāja.

Furthermore, he also wrote a technical treatise on Buddhist pramāṇa theory called the Antarvyāptisamarthana.

=== Spurious works ===
A Sutrasamuccaya-bhasya is attributed to an author named Ratnākaraśānti. However, this treatise defends the ekayana view of buddha-nature, and thus it is likely to be by a different figure using this name, and not by Ratnākaraśānti the Yogācāra philosopher from Vikramaśīla.

== See also ==
- Mahasiddha
