= Maitripada =

Indian Buddhist teacher (1007–1085)

- Maitrīgupta
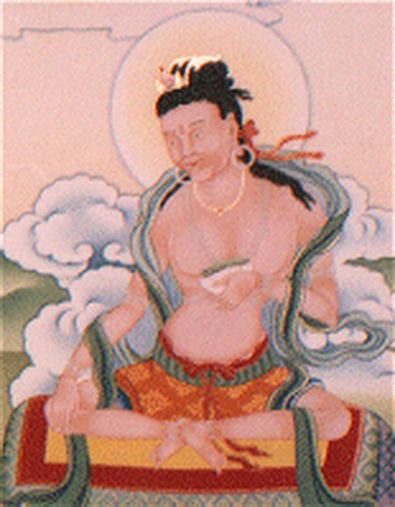

Personal life
- Born: c. 1007 CE Jhatakarani, Magadha (modern-day India)
- Died: c. 1085 CE
- Education: Nalanda; Vikramashila

Religious life
- Religion: Buddhism
- School: Vajrayana

Senior posting
- Teacher: Jñanasrimitra
- Students: Marpa

Maitrīpāda (c. 1007–1085, also known as Maitreyanātha, Advayavajra, and, to Tibetans, Maitrīpa), was a prominent Indian Buddhist Mahasiddha associated with the Mahāmudrā transmission of tantric Buddhism. His teachers were Shavaripa and Naropa. His students include Atisha, Marpa, Vajrapani, Karopa, Natekara (also known as Sahajavajra), Devākaracandra (also known as Śūnyatāsamādhi), and Rāmapāla. His hermitage was in the Mithila region (also known as Tirhut), somewhere in northern Bihar and neighboring parts of southern Nepal.

== Early life ==
As per Tibetan and Nepalese sources, Maitripada was born into a Brahmin family in Magadha in a village near Kapilavastu during the rule of the Pala empire. His year of birth has been commonly placed 1007 C.E. as per the writings of Taranatha who places him around the rule of King Mahipala. Prior to becoming a Buddhist, he was educated in Pāṇinian grammar and Hindu treatises for 7 years.

After his education, he encountered the Buddhist siddha Naropa at the northern gate of Nalanda who engaged him in a debate. Maitripada lost the debate and subsequently converted to Buddhism and was ordained as a monk at the monasteries of Nalanda and Vikramashila in modern-day Bihar. During his stay at these monasteries he was taught by eminent masters such as Ratnākaraśānti.

=== Time at Nalanda and Vikramashila ===
Maitripada had his initial monastic ordination at Nalanda following which he dwelt in Vikramashila where he stayed for four years. While he was noted as an excellent monk, he was also said to be practicing tantra in secret.

Maitripada was known to have left Vikramashila at some point although the sources differ as to the exact reason. According to one account by Padma Karpo, he was engaged in a doctrinal dispute with his guru, Ratnākaraśānti who expounded the Yogachara school of thought. As a result of this dispute, Ratnākaraśānti is said to have ripped part of Maitripada's robes. Nepalese sources detail that following this dispute, the bodhisattva, Avalokiteśvara appeared in Maitripada's dreams and urged him to renounce the monastic life.

Another account from the biography of Atiśa details that he was expelled from the monastery after Atiśa, who was the abbot of the Vikramashila at the time, discovered liquor in his dorms.

=== Later years ===
Following this, he travelled for four months to South India via boat where he became a disciple of Shavaripa from who he received various tantric instructions. During the latter part of his life, he returned to North India where he composed numerous treaties which are now preserved in the Tibetan Buddhist canon.

== Philosophy ==
Maitripada's philosophy straddled between the schools of Madhyamaka and Mahamudra. He did however, still seem to hold the Yogachara school in high regard and thought it a necessary step to his interpretation of Madhyamaka.

=== Gradual Path and Conventional Practices ===
Maitripada emphasised the importance of combining conventional Dharma practices with the nondual wisdom of Mahāmudrā. He acknowledged the necessity of traditional practices such as generosity, discipline, patience, diligence, and meditation as foundational activities (ādikarman). These practices are essential for laying the groundwork for higher realisations and are to be maintained until one reaches the state of no more learning, or Buddhahood.

=== Sudden Realisation ===
For practitioners with sharp faculties, Maitrīpa advocated a direct approach to Mahāmudrā, allowing them to bypass elaborate tantric rituals. This approach involves directly accessing one's inherent bliss or wisdom (sahaja) without relying on traditional practices. However, he cautioned against overestimating one's realisation and neglecting foundational practices.

=== Role of Amanasikāra ===
Central to Maitrīpa's thought was the concept of amanasikāra, or non-meditation, which involves a state of non-conceptual awareness that transcends ordinary dualistic perceptions. This practice is embedded within the broader Mahāyāna framework of the six perfections and is essential for realizing true reality. Maitrīpa's works on amanasikāra emphasised the importance of maintaining conventional Dharma practices alongside advanced meditative techniques.

=== "Mad Conduct" and True Reality ===
Maitrīpa described extreme practices, such as self-sacrifice, as "mad conduct" (unmattavrata). Although these practices may appear irrational, they are expressions of a practitioner's deep realisation of true reality. This conduct is likened to a lion's fearless movement, symbolizing the freedom and fearlessness that come from realizing the nature of reality.

=== Critique of Gradualists ===
Maitrīpa's disciple, Vajrapāṇi, categorises practitioners into those who realize true reality gradually (monkey-like) and those who do so instantaneously (crow-like). The teachings of the three vehicles (Śrāvakayāna, Pratyekabuddhayāna, and Mahāyāna) are considered provisional, intended for those who require a step-by-step approach. Maitrīpa himself offered a more inclusive teaching that combines various elements to cater to different capacities of practitioners.

Maitrīpa's philosophical thought represents a synthesis of profound nondual wisdom with practical, conventional practices, intenditing to accommodate both sudden and gradual paths to enlightenment.

== Works ==
Maitrīpāda composed commentaries on the Buddhist dohas of Saraha. His most important works are a collection of 26 texts on "non-conceptual realization" (amanasikara), which are a key Indian source of mahāmudrā in the Tibetan tradition. These works teach a synthesis of Buddhist Mahayana teachings on emptiness and 'non-abiding' (apratisthana), and Buddhist tantric practices, and they also teach an "instantaneous" path to awakening.

Maitrīpāda's Amanasikara cycle of 26 texts is composed of the following:

- Kudrstinirghatana
- Kudrstinirghatavakyatippinika
- Mulapattayah
- Sthulapattayah
- Tattvaratnavali
- Pañcatathagatamudravivarana
- Sekanirdesa
- Caturmudranvaya
- Sekatatparyasamgraha
- Vajrasattva-Pañcakara
- Mayanirukti
- Svapnanirukti
- Tattvaprakasa
- Apratisthanaprakasa
- Yuganaddhaprakasa
- Mahasukhaprakasa
- Tattvavimsika
- Mahayanavimsika
- Nirvedhapañcaka
- Madhyamasatka
- Premapañcaka
- Tattvadasaka
- Amanasikaradhara
- Sahajasatka
- Dohanidhinamatattvopadesa
- Shes pa spro bsdu med par 'jog pa 'i man ngag gsang ba dam pa

== See also ==
- Marpa
- Naropa

== Notes ==
- "The Life of the Siddha-Philosopher Maitrīgupta" by Mark Tatz Journal of the American Oriental Society Vol. 107, No. 4, 1987, Oct. - Dec. pgs 695-711
