= Jñanasrimitra =

Indian Buddhist philosopher

Personal life
- Born: c. 975 CE
- Died: c. 1025 CE
- Education: Vikramashila

Religious life
- Religion: Buddhism
- School: Mahayana

Senior posting
- Students: Ratnakīrti; Atiśa; Maitripada

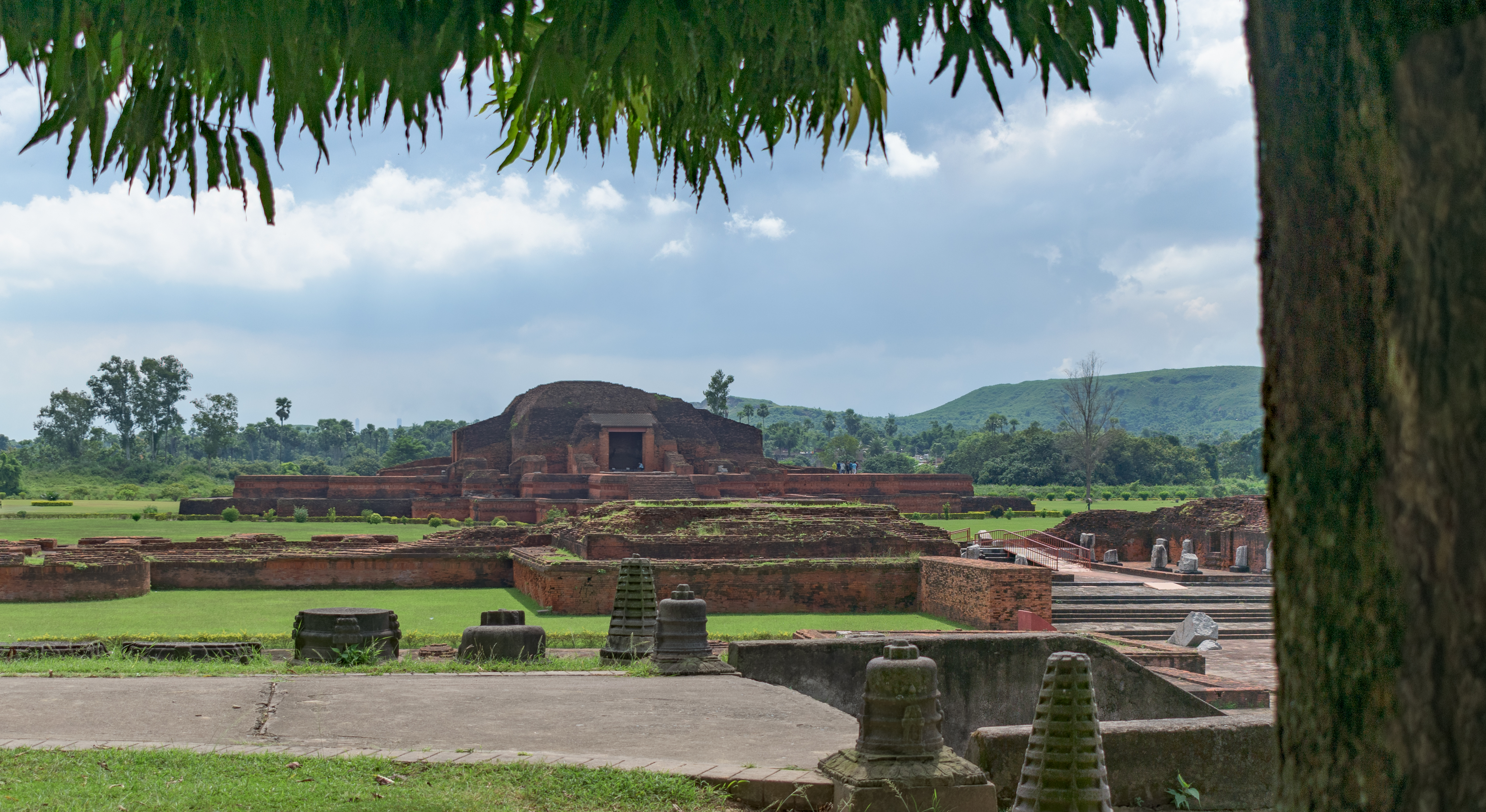
Panorama of the site of Vikramaśīla university, modern day Bhagalpur district, Bihar.

Jñānaśrīmitra (fl. 975-1025 C.E.) was an Indian Buddhist philosopher of the epistemological (pramana) tradition of Buddhist philosophy, which goes back to Dignāga and Dharmakīrti. Jñānaśrīmitra was also known as a Yogācāra Buddhist who defended a form of Buddhist idealism termed Satyākāravāda which holds that cognitive content or aspects of consciousness ("ākāras") are real and not illusory.

In addition to his philosophical works, Jñānaśrīmitra was also a skilled poet and a dvāra-paṇḍita (gate-scholar) of Vikramaśīla university. Among his many students who declared themselves to be his students or were declared by others include Ratnakīrti, Atiśa and Advayavajra among others. Jñānaśrīmitra was also well known by Hindu and Jain thinkers and his name has been referenced in the works of Udyana, Madhava and Śaṅkaramiśra.

== Philosophy ==
=== Epistemology ===
Jñanasrimitra's philosophical work focused on Buddhist logic and epistemology (pramāṇa), especially the theory of "exclusion" (apoha) outlined by Dignaga (c. 480 – c. 540 CE) and how it relates to the philosophy of language, meaning and the nature of conceptual thoughts and awareness. The basic theory behind apoha is that meaning comes from what something is not. For example, "cow" gets its meaning by excluding every non-cow. This was the basic theory of language used by Buddhist pramāṇa philosophers. In his Apohaprakaraṇa ("Monograph on Exclusion"), Jñanasrimitra elaborates on the theory of apoha and its relation to epistemology. He also defends the theory from Hindu critics, who posited competing theories of meaning.

Jñanasrimitra's Vyāpticarcā (Analysis of Pervasion) focuses on inferential relations which in Indian thought is termed vyapti (pervasion). This refers to the epistemic relations between two distinct entities such as smoke and fire. According to Horst Lasic, Jñanasrimitra's position on this topic is that "inference-warranting relations between two distinct entities must be effect-cause relations, and that the presence of such relations can be detected only through a specific sequence of perception and non-apprehension."

=== Satyākāravāda ===
Jñanasrimitra was a defender of Yogācāra idealism, stating that "this entire triple-world is established to be nothing but consciousness (vijñaptimātra)." He states in his Sākārasaṃgrahasūtra:

This world is, first of all, not [determined to be] external, since in itself it has a form apparent to consciousness, and due to the necessary co-apprehension [of supposed objects with the cognitions that apprehend them]. No other thing can possibly be established through reasoning, and, even if it were possible, it would not have the characteristic of being apprehensible. Therefore, all this world is mere consciousness. The world is one [unitary] variegated sensory image, comprising colors such as gold, sounds such as the third note of a musical scale, tastes such as sweet, odors such as the pleasantly fragrant, tactile sensations such as soft, and mental sensations such as pleasure and displeasure.

However, Jñānaśrīmitra’s idealism is more nuanced than the term might suggest, as he does not ultimately establish a hard ontological claim that everything is "mind" like modern idealists. Through his interpretation of apoha, Jñānaśrīmitra’s view allows conventions to be ranked as higher (“ultimate truth”) or lower (“conventional truth”) according to their pragmatic efficacy dependent on a specific purpose (arthakriyā) rather than their approximation to an independently existing ultimate reality. For him, the ultimate purpose of his pragmatic framework is the negation of conceptualization, being the cause of suffering. He terms his ultimate view "citrādvaita" or "variegated non-duality", and distinguishes utterly momentary, variegated appearances associated with the six sense objects (ākāra), from conceptual determination (adhyavasāya), treating determinations such as "one-nor-many" arguments as provisionally adopted and ultimately erroneous, while the ākāra qua ākāra cannot be ”blocked” by further cognition. Thus, calling appearances “ultimately real” does not entail an underlying essence, but rather reflects both the self-evidence and epistemic and soteriological priority he assigns to variegated appearance over conceptual determinations such as imputed refutations and falsifying judgments, including his own designated positions. For Jñanasrimitra, and just like Dharmakīrti, the "unreal" conceptualization (being virtually synonymous as determination), is the cause of suffering and therefore must be negated.This position forms the basis of his critique of both Mādhyamika and Nirākāra (“False Aspectarian”) positions, since falsification depends upon conceptual determination (i.e., conceptually determining an appearance as an object to be refuted), and therefore cannot ultimately falsify the appearance qua appearance.

Jñānaśrīmitra was a major defender of the Sākāra ("with images") school of Yogācāra Buddhism against Ratnākaraśānti, the principal defender of the rival Nirākāra school. This doctrine holds that all awareness events arise together with an "ākāra" (appearance, image, phenomenal form). Jñānaśrīmitra's Sākārasiddhiśāstra is his main defense of Sākāravada while his Advaitabinduprakaraṇa is his main defense of idealism (vijñaptimātratā).

For Jñānaśrīmitra, the manifestation of consciousness (i.e. prakāśa, the radiance, lucidity or shining forth of awareness) is the ultimate existence. Since consciousness is ultimate, appearances which manifest from consciousness are also real, not illusory.

Jñānaśrīmitra's Sākārasiddhi argues that the idea that something which is non-existent could manifest from that which is real (i.e. consciousness) is incoherent. This idea he terms asatkhyāti, "the manifestation of the nonexistent". Thus, for Jñānaśrīmitra, if consciousness is real (as all yogacarins agree), then the images which manifest or radiate from it must also be real. Nirakaravadins like Ratnākaraśānti say that false imagination (vikalpa) can make an unreal object manifest to awareness. Jñānaśrīmitra seeks to deny this and prove that if anything manifests to consciousness, it must exist (and further, to prove that what does not manifest, does not exist).

Ratnākaraśānti argues in his texts that an appearance can, upon analysis, be shown to be unreal, because it can be shown to be illusory by a later cognition that defeats it. Jñānaśrīmitra's main problem with this view is that if reality is not determined by what manifests to consciousness, how can you have any confidence in any subsequent defeater cognition? Jñānaśrīmitra argues that this view is epistemically self-defeating since the defeater cognition is just another manifestation to consciousness which is as unreal as the cognition being defeated. Moreover, in order for one to falsify an appearance, the appearance must first be conceptually determined as an object of falsification, thus rendering the negation itself as conceptual determination. This means that the defender of the view that appearances are unreal cannot have a robust epistemology without any cognition to ground himself on. For him, to affirm only the unreality of everything risks falling into misguided exclusion (apavāda). Since real and unreal are relational designations, denying the former while universally affirming the latter risks turning unreality into an independently established absolute. To avoid this, “real” must be retained as a conventional, pragmatic designation without implying intrinsic existence.

=== Exclusion (apoha) and Conventional and Ultimate Truth ===
Jñānaśrīmitra accepts Dignāga's theory of apoha as an account of conceptual and verbal awareness, but only as a "conventionally adopted position" (vyavasthā). An exclusion qualifies the fictitious external particular that conceptual awareness determines, rather than existing as a self-sufficient object of awareness. Thus, conceptual and verbal awareness involve both positive and negative aspects, being an appearance and the exclusion through which it is conceptually differentiated. Ultimately for him however, all language refers to “nothing”.

Jñānaśrīmitra explains this through his theory of conditionally adopted positions. A position may be adopted for a particular rhetorical or pedagogical purpose even when it is known to be untrue. Thus, he can defend the apoha theory in debate without treating exclusion as ultimately real. For Jñānaśrīmitra, this theory is useful because it counters the realist claim that conceptual language expresses a positive entity alone. In this sense, doctrines such as apoha function as “white lies” as McCrea and Patil argue, as they are deliberately adopted formulations whose value lies in their practical or soteriological purpose rather than in their literal truth.

Jñānaśrīmitra treats “conventional” and “ultimate” truth as relative to the pragmatic efficacy (arthakriyā) of a given position. A higher-order convention is “ultimately true” only in relation to the lower-order convention, rather than because it more accurately corresponds to an independently existing ultimate reality. “Ultimate truth” therefore marks the highest convention justified by pragmatic efficacy with respect to a purpose, in this case the negation of conceptualization, rather than a foundation beyond convention.

=== Manifestation and determination ===
One critique of Jñānaśrīmitra's Sākāravada view is that if our conventional appearances are true and not in error, we would always already know the ultimate truth and there would be no need for a spiritual path or epistemology. Furthermore, things appear to be external, but they are agreed by all yogacarins to be mind-only. According to Davey K. Tomlinson, Jñānaśrīmitra's response is to propose "a complex system that sharply divides what is manifest from what is constructed through determination (adhyavasāya) by processes of exclusion (apoha). What is determined, and so what is not manifest, does not ultimately exist—and it’s that that constitutes conventional existence." Jñānaśrīmitra uses examples such as a mirage and the sensation of grass brushing against someone walking through a field. A mirage illustrates how an appearance can be mistakenly determined as water, while the sensation of grass illustrates how something can appear without being conceptually identified. These examples demonstrate that manifestation and determination are epistemically distinct.

For Jñānaśrīmitra, error and confusion develop out of determination (adhyavasāya) which works through using exclusion (apoha). Thus, the conventional truth (which is illusory) is not what is manifest, but what is determined and imagined by the mind. Regarding external objects, Jñānaśrīmitra says that what it means for them to seem to be “external” is that they are objects of certain kinds of verbal and mental activity (pravṛtti).

Jñānaśrīmitra's Sākārasiddhi says:

This is how it really works: Right as it is arising with some appearance (ākāra), conceptual construction (vikalpa)—propelled by diverse, beginningless habituations and relying upon a particular causal condition that awakens it—lays down the continuity of a recollection of the accomplishment of an aim (arthakriyā) (a desire and so on), which is conducive to externally directed activity (bahirmukhapravṛttyanukūla). Then, on the part of a person who has some desire for the accomplishment of an aim, there is activity, avoidance, or doing nothing in conformity with the external object.

Jñānaśrīmitra argues that every moment of awareness arises with an appearance or image (ākāra). Conceptual awareness events also contain attachment and desire, which propels an activity which is directed away from the experience of the image itself. When we experience a cake, we are experiencing a specific variegated appearance. This appearance is such that it can support the conceptual construction of a "cake" (through attachment to pleasure, memory, and karmic habits) in our minds. This leads to an activity, such as attempting to consume the cake. While the variegated image is true, the conceptual construction of "cake" is an erroneous determination which is bound to the image. This complex erroneous object never manifests to consciousness, only the image does.

The main difference between determination and manifestation is that determination is focused on differentiation (pariccheda), especially the subject-object distinction (grāhyagrāhakabhāva). This difference, furthermore, is never manifest, because for anything to be manifest is for it to be immediately present to reflexive awareness (svasamvitti), and a moment of awareness cannot be aware of something differentiated since it is a unitary undifferentiated self-awareness. This also means each awareness is “locked away” self-contained, without direct access to other awareness events (diachronically or synchronically). Any idea of a sequence of awareness events in time and space, any idea of a ‘person’, is a conceptual construct and so it is only relatively true. Also, any idea of causality is also just a conventional conceptual truth that does not exist ultimately. This also means all reasoning and epistemology are also conventional, and they cannot disprove the sheer manifestation of awareness itself, which is clearly present, and phenomenally obvious. It is thus an ultimate existence which is irrefutable by proofs or reasons, which rely on determination.

=== The variegated image and awareness-event and their negating function ===
Jñānaśrīmitra interprets Dharmakīrti’s account of variegated awareness-event in PV 3.220 as already “released from both [being unitary and being multiple].” He glosses “variegated” as “a negation of being unitary” and “awareness-event” as “a negation of being manifold.” Jñānaśrīmitra consequently holds that what manifests is neither unitary nor manifold, while “being unitary” as an awareness-event is a skillful conventional designation employed as a negation of the proliferation of many due to his position on radical momentariness without duration or enduring entities. Hence his assertion "in true convention, being manifold [many] serves no purpose". In addition, because the image is variegated with sense objects, this variegation serves as the negation of ontological reductionism, being one. On this reading, these terms already function non-affirmatively, excluding the conceptual extremes of unity and multiplicity without establishing a further positive characterization of manifestation nor requiring further conceptual determinations such as redundant negations.

In his Sākārasiddhiśāstra, Jñānaśrīmitra seeks to explain a difficult issue, mainly how a variegated mental image (citravijñāne), like a multi-coloured butterfly wing, can possibly be experienced. The problem here is that this variegated experience does not seem unitary, but if it is manifold, this seems to refute the idea that an awareness event is an undifferentiated non-dual consciousness. This is the "one or many" argument which is used by various Buddhist philosophers to show that something cannot be real because it cannot be either a single thing nor many things.

Jñānaśrīmitra argues that this binary opposition (unity and manifoldness) is a type of determination, a conceptual distinction which does not manifest to non-dual awareness. The variegated image is therefore neither unitary nor manifold, it is merely an image in which various elements come together, but they are not themselves distinct elements in opposition to each other (as the opponent claims). This is because differentiation itself is never manifested to any single awareness event. To separate out the various elements of one variegated image is just a relative and conceptual move. The key point for Jñānaśrīmitra is that what makes something real is that it manifests to awareness self-evidently, not whether it can be understood as one thing or as manifold.

=== Buddha-nature and Buddhahood ===
According to Jñānaśrīmitra, emptiness is identified with buddha-nature (tathāgatagarbha), which is free from all superimposition and denial. This buddha-nature is identified with emptiness, which is understood as an inseparable property of luminous manifestation (prakāśa), and the real aspects (ākāras) are luminous appearances, which are ultimately real in the sense of their manifestation. These “appearances of lucidity” (prakāśarūpa) are also real and free from superimposition and denial, but sentient beings misunderstand their true nature through conceptual determination. Jñānaśrīmitra approaches the property, “dharma” being emptiness, through the “dharmin”, the ākāra, arguing that emptiness is a property of what manifests and cannot be understood independently of manifestation. Therefore, he prioritizes the epistemic basis of appearances to understand emptiness, as opposed to the negation of conceptualization alone.

Jñānaśrīmitra states:

For the properties of the Buddha, too, do not really exist with the nature constructed by others’ awarenesses, since they exist only as being knowable firsthand through reflexive awareness. This explains the Blessed One’s being dream-like and illusion-like, for in those examples, too, what is negated is only what is determined, not what appears. Therefore, the proof that the Blessed One is simply sākāra [and not nirākāra] is without defeat. This is settled.

Furthermore, the ultimately real and non-dual conscious manifestation is the field of a Buddha's awareness (buddhagocara), it is the non-duality that a Buddha knows and which is always present. This is the citrādvaita (variegated non-duality) which is marvellous (āścarya). This non-dual Buddhahood is not just an imageless consciousness, but it contains immeasurable marvellous qualities. Jñānaśrīmitra describes it as “variegated by the splendour of the major and minor marks”, and “the storehouse of excellent qualities, devoid of the mass of impure appearances that are connected to habituations to the unreal— but it is not at all without appearances.” These variegated manifestations are the real compassionate manifestations of a Buddha, the sambhoghakāyas. For Jñānaśrīmitra, to negate the appearance of variegated sense objects free from the conceptual extremes of one nor many is effectively to negate the very manifestation of buddhahood itself, hence those who recognize only the dharmakāya have “stolen away their own teacher.”

== Non-philosophical works ==
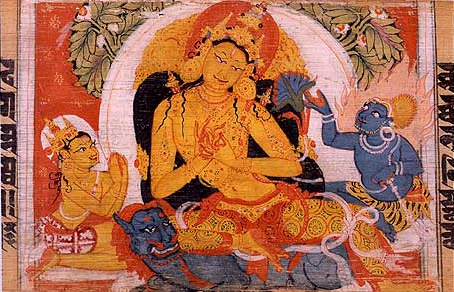
Painting of Manjushri. Sanskrit Astasahasrika Prajnaparamita Sutra manuscript written in the Ranjana script. Nalanda, Bihar, India, c. 700-1100 CE

Jñānaśrīmitra's non-philosophical interests were poetry and literary theory. The Vṛttamālāstuti was composed by Jñānaśrīmitra as a devotional poem to the bodhisattva Manjushri and follows the standard Sanskrit poetic metre. His verses have also been preserved in other works including the Subhāṣitaratnakośa which is an anthology of poems produced by different authors.

== Works ==
So far 12 of Jñānaśrīmitra are extant, all in their original Sanskrit and found on a single manuscript. Unlike many of his contemporaries, his works are mainly composed in the form of a monograph rather than being written as a commentary on an existing work. A Tibetan-language work purported to have been written by Jñānaśrīmitra relating to tantra although it is uncertain and could possibly have been written by an author sharing the same name.

- Advaitabindu (Drop of Non-dualism)
- Abhisamayahrdaya
- Anekacintamani
- Anupalabdhirahasya
- Apohaprakarana (Monograph on Apoha)
- Bhedabhedapariksa
- Sākārasiddhiśāstra (A Treatise Proving That Awareness Contains an Image)
- Sarvaśabdābhāvacarcā
- Isvaradusana (Disproving God)
- Karyakaranabhavasiddhi
- Ksanabhangadhyaya (On momentariness)
- (Adhyardha)Prajnaparamita(naya)satapancasatika
- Sakarasamgrahasutra
- Sarvajnasiddhi
- Sarvasabdabhavacarca
- Vyapticarca
- Vrttamâlâstuti
- Yoginirnaya(prakarana)

== See also ==
- Ratnākaraśānti
- Prajñakaragupta
- Ratnakirti
