= Prakāśa =

Indian philosophical concept

Prakāśa is a concept in Indian philosophy translated by various authors as "light", "luminosity", "shining forth", "manifestation", "splendour", "light of consciousness" and so forth.

In Buddhist philosophy, the term was used to refer to the self-reflexive nature of awareness. In late Yogacara Buddhist philosophy, prakāśa was used to refer to the true nature of mind, the luminous mind, which is the ultimate truth, the ultimate reality.

In Kashmir Shaivism prakāśa is identified with God, Śiva. Paul E. Murphy describes it as, "luminous and undifferentiated consciousness," and Paul Muller-Ortega glosses it as "primordial light beyond all manifestations". For the Shaivas, prakāśa is considered supreme, ultimate, unsurpassable, but as such it cannot be described as pure transcendence, because even though it is above all, it is still present in the manifestation, in every aspect of it. Thus prakāśa is said to be both transcendent and immanent.

== In Buddhist philosophy ==
According to Jonardon Ganeri, the concept was introduced by the Buddhist philosopher Dignāga (c.480–c.540 CE). For Dignāga and his follower Dharmakīrti, the idea refers to Svasaṃvedana, the inherent reflexivity or self-aware nature of consciousness. This means that in the process of being aware of any object, consciousness also illuminates itself at the same time.

Zhihua Yao writes that the concept has older roots in the Mahasanghika school's view of an inherently pure luminous mind.

In late Indian Yogācāra Buddhist philosophy, "Prakāśa" is often used to describe a feature of the nature of mind, i.e. the luminous mind which is the ultimate reality in Yogacara idealist metaphysics. The term was used by Indian Yogacara thinkers like Prajñākaragupta (8th-9th century), Jñānaśrīmitra (fl. 975-1025 C.E.) and Ratnākaraśānti (late-10th century to mid-11th century), both well known scholars at Vikramashila university.

According to Prajñākaragupta, all phenomena are ultimately prakāśa:

From the standpoint of the highest truth, nothing shines that is not luminosity (prakāśa)...Also, the object shines due to its nature (prakāśa (ka) rūpeṇa); it is not illuminated by anything else (Pramāṇavārttikālaṃkāra).

In his Prajñāpāramitopadeśa, Ratnākaraśānti says that the self-nature (ātmabhūtaḥ) of all phenomena is prakāśa. He states that all phenomena which are experienced must have radiance (prakāśa), which is the capacity to appear (pratibhāsa). Without this capacity for shining forth that consciousness has, nothing could appear to consciousness. For Ratnākaraśānti, prakāśa, the luminous pure mind, which is also a reflexive awareness (svasamvedana), is the only thing which is real, all appearances are illusory and false. This view is termed the nirākāravāda ("without images", also known as alikākāravāda) view of Yogācāra. It holds that ultimate reality is a pure luminosity, a prakāśa without any cognitive images or appearances. Appearances only arise from cognitive distortions and are always illusory, while the ultimate reality is a radiant imageless consciousness.

Jñānaśrīmitra meanwhile sees both prakāśa and its manifestations (all apparent phenomena) as being real. For him, something unreal cannot emerge or manifest from something real. Thus, he argues that all ākāras (mental images, appearances, cognitive aspects) are also real, since they are manifestations of something real, that is prakāśa. This view is termed Sākāravada, the view that ultimare reality is radiant (prakāśa) consciousness along with its images or manifestations.

== In Hindu philosophy ==
The concept of prakāśa is important in non-dual Shaivism. In Advaita Vedanta, it is known as Svayam prakāśa.

=== Kashmir Shaivism ===
In Trika Shaivism, prakāśa, the uncreated light of awareness, is the essence of God, Śiva. Its function is to illuminate, to make manifest. However, Kashmir Shaivism declares that the nature of prakāśa is "self apprehension" (vimarśa), or, to reflect upon itself. Thus, according to Kṣemaraja, "If the supreme light were devoid of this free and spontaneous self-referential capacity, it would be powerless and inert". Thus, prakāśa and vimarśa form a couple at the supreme level, identified respectively with Śiva and Śakti. Kashmir Shaivism accords a very important role to the concept of consciousness as light or luminosity. The term prakāśa is often glossed and explained through various other terms, including:

- sphurattā - twinkling, spark
- ābhāsa - splendour, light, appearance, shining forth
- pratibhā - to shine upon, become clear or manifest, intuition
- sphuraṇa - glittering, sparkling
- ullāsa - light, splendour, bright

Abhinavagupta (c. 950 – 1016 CE), the great exegete of Kashmir Shaivism, says in his Tantraloka that "consciousness is formed of light and beatitude"

Furthermore, for Abhinava, knowledge of prakāśa is central to the Saiva soteriological process. Thus, the Tantraloka states: "by the means of the splendid light that shines in the immaculate heart, one obtains union with Śiva," and also "the yogi who has had the experience of the great light enters into the condition of being of the nature of Śiva."

=== Subjective experiences of prakāśa ===
There is no way a personal experience of prakāśa could be fully conveyed into words, but mystics, both ancient and modern, have tried to do so, because such words carry a powerful spiritual charge. Some of the subjective attributes of the light of consciousness, in synthesis, are: "liquid", "blissful", "immaculate", "blinding", "enveloping" and "weightless". Here are but a few of the many accounts:

==== Bhaṭṭa Nārāyaṇa ====
Stavacintāmaṇi by Bhaṭṭa Nārāyaṇa is an intensely devotional text of Kashmir Shaivism. Here are some quotes referring to the light of consciousness :

- Parameśvara ... "blindingly shining in eternity"
- Śañkara ... "infinite light whose essence is the pure ambrosia"
- Śiva ... "you are the white-shining essence, origin of every intention, unchanged in each reincarnation"

==== Jaideva Singh ====
In his translation of Pratyabhijnahridayam uses such formulations :

- about consciousness: "the perfect I-consciousness is full of light and bliss"
- about the spiritual heart: "Hṛdaya is not the physical heart. It had been called hṛdaya because it is the center of reality. It is the light of consciousness."
- the world as seen from the perspective of the liberated being - "the world no longer appears as mere earth, but as clothed in celestial light".

==== Ramakrishna ====
A mystical experience of Ramakrishna, representing a turning point for him :

- "Everything vanished, as if there was nothing anywhere! And what was that I saw? A boundless, endless, conscious ocean of light;...; brilliant rows of waves were roaring towards me"

==== Yogananda ====
A few accounts of encounters with the uncreated light, by Yogananda :

- "I saw a blinding light, enveloping my body and the entire room"
- "a fluid piercing light streaming from every pore;...; my sense of identity was no longer confined to a body but embraced the circumambient atoms"
- "I gazed at my arms and moved them back and forth, yet could not feel their weight; ecstatic joy overwhelmed me... the illusion of a solid body was completely dissipated, as my realization deepened that the essence of all things is light"
