= Svasaṃvedana =

Buddhist term

Translations of Svasaṃvedana
- English: Reflexive awareness, Self-awareness
- Sanskrit: Svasaṃvedana
- Tibetan: Ranggi rig pa

In Buddhist philosophy, svasaṃvedana (also svasaṃvitti) is a term which refers to the reflexive nature of consciousness, or the awareness of being aware. It was initially a theory of cognition held by the Mahāsaṃghika and Sautrāntika schools while the Sarvāstivāda-Vaibhāṣika school argued against it.

The idea was famously defended by the Indian philosopher Dignāga, and is an important doctrinal term in Indian Mahāyāna thought and Tibetan Buddhism. It is also often translated as self-cognition or self-apperception, and by Malcolm Smith as "one's own vidyā." Dignāga's follower Dharmakīrti also defended the theory, and their arguments were later summarized by Śāntarakṣita in his Tattvasaṃgraha.

== Indian Buddhism ==
According to Zhihua Yao, the theory was first presented by the Mahāsāṃghika school. Their view was preserved in the Sarvāstivāda compendium of Abhidharma called the Mahāvibhāṣa. According to this text, the view of the Mahāsāṃghika School was that "It is the nature (svabhāva) of awareness (jñāna) and so forth to apprehend, thus awareness can apprehend itself as well as others. This is like a lamp that can illuminate itself and others owing to its nature of luminosity." Jan Westerhoff notes that the Mahāsāṃghikas accepted the doctrine of the natural luminosity of the mind, which he connects with svasaṃvedana: "such natural luminosity making it possible that consciousness does not just apprehend other things, but can also apprehend itself."

Sarvāstivāda sources which engage with self-cognition, such as the Jñānaprasthāna and Mahāvibhāṣa, are primarily concerned to refute the view that a mind moment can know itself in that same moment. However, that does not mean the Sarvāstivādins rejected all theories of self-cognition. They developed their own theory which argued that mind moments know themselves only reflexively in regards to previous mind moments. As Zhihua Yao states, "in other words, the mind knows itself through a reflection of the past mind". The Sarvāstivādins use their metaphysical theory of the real existence of the past, present and future to allow for a present mind to take a past mind as itself.

Sautrāntika authors also discussed the theory. It was extensively covered by Harivarman, the author of the Tattvasiddhi-Śāstra, and shows that he was in a dialogue with both Sarvastivada and Mahāsaṃghika views. Harivarman's view argues against the Mahāsamghika's simultaneous model of self-cognition and instead argues that self-cognition is only seen in the course of successive moments of cognition. That is, it involves multiple mental processes which Harivarman considers as happening in the "present continuum" and is not a case of a single mind moment knowing itself but is a case of the mind grasping the "image" (ākāra) of itself as it is fading away. This is also part of his account of how memory works.

The Buddhist philosopher Dignāga also defended a theory of svasaṃvedana drawing on Sautrāntika and Yogācāra influences. For Dignāga, svasaṃvedana is a kind of perception (pratyakṣa) which is an "internal awareness of mental consciousness" and his theory of perception also entails that it is non-conceptual (unlike the other source of valid cognition, anumāna - inference). He asserts that svasaṃvedana is a valid means to knowledge, just as sense-perception is. Dignāga gives three reasons for why cognition can grasp an object and itself.

1. Without a self-reflexive nature, there would be no difference between a) cognition of the object, and b) awareness of the cognition of the object.
2. If the cognition only grasped itself, the content of an earlier cognition would be gone when a later cognition takes place.
3. Memory proves a self-reflexive nature of cognition because one is able to remember both the object and one's former cognition of it.

Dharmakīrti, Dignāga's most influential follower also defended svasaṃvedana. He claimed that cognition and its object are the same because they are perceived together at the same time. If one could not perceive cognition, one could not perceive its content either. He argues that cognition cannot be cognized by another cognition because that would lead to infinite regress: the second cognition would require a third cognition to cognize it and so on. The Yogācāra-Madhyamaka philosopher Śāntarakṣita summarizes Dignāga's and Dharmakīrti's arguments for svasaṃvedana in his Tattvasaṃgraha. He also discusses two additional features of svasaṃvedana.

1. Self-awareness is not determined by other cognitions
2. Self-awareness is a distinctive feature of sentience

Westerhoff also points out that Śāntarakṣita's Tattvasaṃgraha "argues that if an act of consciousness of some object x was not reflexively self-aware, it could also not be conscious of x."

=== Soteriological and epistemic aspects ===
According to Yao, the doctrine of self-cognition evolved out of a soteriological context in early materials. He points out that for the Mahāsāṃghika, soteriological and epistemological senses of the doctrine were closely linked, and when Sarvāstivādins rejected the Mahāsāṃghika, they also discussed self-cognition in the soteriological context of omniscience. Moreover, the Sautrāntikas referred to yogic practice when discussing their view that the mental consciousness is self-aware, and within early Yogācāra as well, the understanding of self-cognition was broad and included the sense of self-realization. However, after Dignāga, the doctrine developed in the context of an epistemic inquiry in which the soteriological and epistemological senses were clearly distinguished.

While Yao believes that it is important to maintain a technical distinction between the soteriological concept of "self-realization" (pratyātmasaṃvedya) and the more epistemological "self-cognition" (svasaṃvedana), he points out that in Chinese sources zi zheng 自證 can be used to translate both terms, and that "[t]his ambiguity reflects a more complicated relationship, rather than a clear-cut distinction between the two concepts." Yao also observes that Yogācāra-Madhyamikas such as Śāntarakṣita and his disciple Kamalaśīla attempted a return to more soteriological concerns in their presentation of self-cognition, understanding it less as an epistemic process and more as "the very nature of consciousness." As Kamalaśīla states in his commentary on Śāntarakṣita's Tattvasaṃgraha:

When Cognition is said to be 'self-cognisant', it is not meant that it is the apprehender or cogniser of itself; what is meant is that it shines,—becomes manifested,—by itself,—by its very nature,—just like the Light diffused in the atmosphere.

Yao explains, "by rejecting the articulated epistemological formulations, they [i.e., Śāntarakṣita and Kamalaśīla] have returned to a Mahāsāṃghika position, according to which self-cognition is more simple, fundamental and soteriologically oriented." The Yogācāra-Madhyamaka synthesis was in keeping with the Nirākāravāda position on self-cognition. On the other hand, Sākāravāda thinkers such as Dharmakīrti, Prajñākaragupta and Jñānaśrīmitra exemplified a Sautrāntika-Yogācāra synthesis which aligned with the Sautrāntika tendency to articulate self-cognition within a more epistemological framework.

== In Tibetan Buddhism ==
Svasaṃvedana is at the root of a major doctrinal disagreement in Indian Mahayana Buddhism. While defended by the Yogācāra thinkers such as Dharmakīrti and the eclectic Śāntarakṣita, it was attacked by Prasaṅgika Madhyamika thinkers such as Candrakīrti and Śāntideva. Since in Madhyamaka thought all dharmas are empty of inherent essence (svabhāva), they argued that consciousness could not be an inherently reflexive ultimate reality since that would mean it was self-validating and therefore not characterized by emptiness.

In Tibetan Buddhism there are various competing views regarding svasaṃvedana (Tibetan: ranggi rig pa).

In the Nyingma school's Dzogchen tradition, svasaṃvedana is often called 'the very nature of mind' (sems kyi chos nyid) and metaphorically referred to as 'luminosity' (gsal ba) or 'clear light' ('od gsal). A common Tibetan metaphor for this reflexivity is that of a lamp in a dark room which in the act of illuminating objects in the room also illuminates itself. Dzogchen meditative practices aim to bring the mind to direct realization of this luminous nature. In Dzogchen (as well as some Mahāmudra traditions) svasaṃvedana is seen as the primordial substratum or ground (gdod ma'i gzhi) of mind.

Following Je Tsongkhapa's (1357–1419) interpretation of the Prasaṅgika Madhyamaka view, the Gelug school completely denies both the conventional and the ultimate existence of reflexive awareness. This is one of Tsongkhapa's "eight difficult points" that distinguish the Prasaṅgika view from others. The Nyingma philosopher Jamgon Ju Mipham Gyatso (1846–1912) defended the conventional existence of reflexive awareness as per the Madhyamaka two truths doctrine. According to Mipham, the Prasaṅgika critique of reflexive awareness only applied to its ultimate inherent reality and not its conventional status.

Mipham gives a number of absurd consequences that would follow if the conventional existence of svasaṃvedana were rejected. First, rejecting svasaṃvedana would mean absurdly that one's own consciousness would be hidden to itself. Since one's own consciousness would not be known directly, one would have to rely on inference to know the state of one's own mind in any given moment. This argument draws on a threefold distinction made by Dignāga and Dharmakīrti between: [1] evident objects which can be known by direct perception, [2] hidden objects which must be known by inference, and [3] very hidden objects (such as the precise details of karma and rebirth) which can only be known by relying on the authority of the Buddha. Moreover, it follows from this that there would be no difference between the manner in which one knows one's own mind and the way in which one knows the mind of another person. As Williams explains, "just as one has to infer the existence of other minds, so one would have to infer the existence of one's own mind. Absurdly, one would know one's own mind in just the same way as one knows of the minds of other sentient beings." This would mean one would not be able to prove for oneself that one has a mind of one's own. Finally, if one's mind were hidden to itself, one could have no knowledge of cognitive referents either, and this would amount to a kind of annihilation of the "transactional conventions of awareness."

== In East Asian Buddhism ==
According to Zhihua Yao, Chinese developments in the doctrine of self-cognition can be divided into three phases: the old Yogācāra in China (which blended Yogācāra with Buddha-nature teachings), the new Yogācāra of Xuanzang and Kuiji, and contemporary Yogācāra studies beginning at the start of the twentieth-century. Yao observes that the old and new Yogācāra in China correspond respectively to Nirākāravāda and Sākāravāda views in India. According to the Nirākāravāda, consciousness is without different parts or divisions. Thus, self-cognition is reflexive and not involved with subjective and objective aspects of consciousness. The Nirākāravāda position, according to which subject and object are illusory, is represented in the East Asian śāstra, the Awakening of Faith. On the other hand, the new Yogācārins Xuanzang and Kuiji defended the Sākāravāda view of Dharmapāla. According to their view, the various parts or divisions of consciousness (bhāga) are real.

According to the Huayan patriarch Fazang, self-cognition is the original karmic appearance (yexiang) which causes the delusive world of saṃsāra with all its suffering. In this, Fazang differed from certain Yogācāra views, such as that of Dignāga, according to which self-cognition is an effect of consciousness' subjective aspect perceiving its objective aspect. Fazang's view corresponds rather to that of the Awakening of Faith for which karmic appearance, being a state in which the mind is aware only of itself, is the cause of both the subjective aspect of consciousness as well as the illusory objective world. As Zhihua Yao explains, according to this view, karmic appearance, or self-cognition, "is not contributed by an external agency because the arising or awareness is inherent to the mind or reality itself."

The Korean commentator on the Awakening of Faith, Taehyeon (c. 750), argued that in addition to the five kinds of manas (mentation) enumerated in the text, there should be added another: svajātilakṣaṇa, or "genuine appearance," which he borrows from the Laṅkāvatāra Sūtra. For Taehyeon, genuine appearance is to be regarded as the first manas, as it is unconditioned and not dependent on any other manas. Since it possesses the nature of illumination, genuine appearance is thus the basis of the other five types of mentation (namely, karmic consciousness, or appearance; transformative consciousness; representative consciousness; intellectual consciousness; and continuous consciousness). Regarding self-cognition, Taehyeon states that it refers to both genuine and karmic appearance, corresponding to his first and second manas respectively.

According to the Huayan patriarch and Chan master Guifeng Zongmi, the essence of the true mind is awareness or knowing (知; zhi). Zongmi takes the true nature to be a "spiritual Knowing that never darkens," describing mind as "aware in and of itself," or "spontaneously Knowing" (自知; zizhi). (Note: The expression, "spiritual Knowing that never darkens," lingzhi bumei 靈知不昧 (also translated as "numinous awareness unobscured"), appears in the writings of Zongmi’s Huayan teacher, Chengguan, as well. According to Chengguan, "The non-abiding mind substance is a spiritual Knowing that never darkens.") For Zongmi, knowing or awareness is thus a "direct manifestation of the very essence itself" (t'ang-t'i piao-hsien). Zongmi explains that the true mind has two types of functioning: one original and intrinsic, the other conditioned and responsive. According to Jenny Hung, Zongmi’s intrinsic functioning of the true mind refers to "reflexive awareness in and of itself," while the responsive function is "reflexive awareness with content." Zongmi gives the analogy of a bright mirror to illustrate their relationship: where the responsive function is likened to the appearance in response to conditions of various reflected images, the intrinsic function is likened to the mirror's constant brightness itself. He says, "The reflections appear [when the mirror] is face to face with objective supports. They appear in a thousand varieties, but the brightness is an intrinsically constant brightness. The brightness is just one flavor." (Note: Compare with the following from the famous Chan poem, the Zhengdao ge: "The maṇi pearl is unknown to people; You can find it in the Tathāgata-garbha. The functions of the six senses are both empty and not empty, One perfect light with colors, yet colorless.")

In Chan sources one can also find the term 自照, zizhao, or self-illumination. For example, the Hongzhi Chanshi Guanglu of Chan master Hongzhi Zhengjue, who famously promoted the practice of silent illumination, contains the phrase 本光自照 (ben guang zi zhao), "the inherent light illuminates itself." Zizhao appears in earlier Chan works as well, such as the Xin Ming (Mind Inscription), attributed to Niutou Farong (594–657):

Bodhi exists originally
It has no need of being preserved
Afflictions have no intrinsic existence
They do not need to be eradicated
Numinous knowing is self-illuminated [自照, zizhao]
The myriad dharmas return to Thusness
There is no return, no receiving
Cut off contemplation, forget preservation

See also the well-known Xinxin Ming (Faith-Mind Inscription), attributed to the third Chan Patriarch Sengcan though likely a product of the Oxhead School, which flourished during the Tang dynasty:

Nothing remains
Nothing is harboured in memory
Void, clear, self-illumining [自照, zizhao]
The heart-strength does not struggle
It is not the place of calculated thinking
Difficult for understanding and sentiment to fathom
In the Dharma realm of true Suchness
There is no other, no self

The Japanese Sōtō Zen master Menzan Zuihō (1683–1769) comments in his Jijuyū-Zanmai that this means that "the light of the Self shines brightly," saying that it is "similar to the light of a jewel illuminating the jewel itself." As such, there is no need to engage in mental struggle.

The Chanzong Yongjia ji, attributed to Huineng's disciple Yongjia Xuanjue, expresses that it is unnecessary for a knower to know knowing. This is explained in the context of later moments of knowing proceeding from earlier ones. The text states, "If the prior moment of extinction induces a subsequent knowing, and that knowing in turn continues the cycle of extinction, then the continuity of arising and ceasing is itself the path of saṃsāra. What is meant now by 'knowing' is that one need not 'know the knowing.' It is simply knowing and nothing more. In this way, the prior moment does not connect to extinction, and the subsequent moment is not induced. When before and after are severed from their continuity, the middle point stands naturally alone." (前則滅 滅引知 後則知 知續滅. 生滅相續 自是輪廻之道. 今言知者 不須知知 但知而已. 則前不接滅 後不引起 前後斷續 中間自孤.)

The Śūraṅgama Sūtra, generally regarded to be an East Asian apocryphon, explains the coming into being of the world of illusion in terms of "adding understanding to understanding." According to the sutra, intrinsic enlightenment is inherently pure and endowed with understanding, but on the basis of an additional understanding which has been added to it, there arises illusion. The text explains, "nothing need be added to true enlightenment, but once an understanding is added nevertheless, that understanding must understand something." This is taken to refer to the self-verifying division of the ālayavijñāna, or storehouse consciousness, which is the subtlest aspect of delusion.

== Modern debates ==
The modern philosopher and Buddhist scholar Jay Garfield challenges the view that consciousness knows itself in a direct and non-conceptual manner. According to Garfield, experience is something opaque and deceptive. Garfield regards awareness as necessarily conceptual, stating that "the mind, and even consciousness, are hidden, rather than manifest phenomena, known only by inference, and through imperfect processes." On the other hand, Evan Thompson critiques Garfield's view, dubbing it "Sellarsian Buddhism," after Wilfrid Sellars' idea of "the myth of the given," which Garfield invokes. Thompson defends reflexive awareness, arguing that it does not imply total self-comprehension. Rather, as pre-reflective self-awareness, it is that which makes possible all subsequent reflection and thematization. According to Thompson, "Reflexive awareness (svasaṃvedana) is the nonconceptual feeling (vedana) of being aware in being aware. This form of self-awareness is a necessary precondition for being able to access one's mental states via metacognition, but it does not amount to self-knowledge."

== See also ==
- Prakasha
- Buddha-nature
- Śrīharṣa
- Ösel (yoga)
- Rangtong-Shentong
- Rigpa
- Vijñāna
- Svayam prakāśa (self-luminosity in Advaita Vedanta)
