= Buddha Smriti Park =

Park in Patna, India

- बुद्ध स्मृति पार्क; Buddha Memorial Park
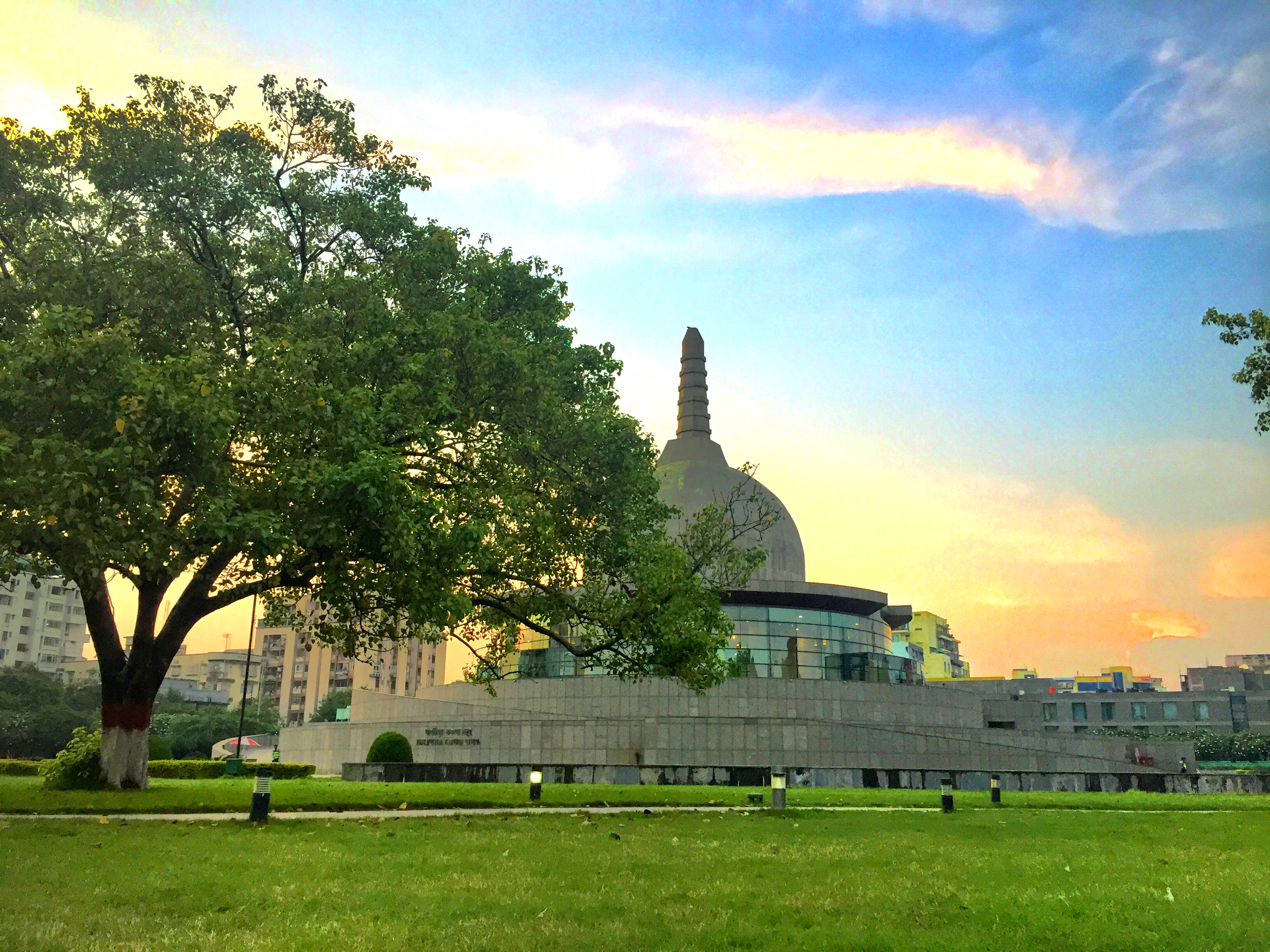
- Patliputra Karuna Stupa in Buddha Smriti Park

- Location within Patna
- Type: Urban park
- Location: Frazer Road, Patna, India
- Coordinates: 25°36′24″N 85°8′10″E
- Area: 22 acres (8.9 ha)
- Operator: Bihar Urban Infrastructure Development Corporation
- Open: perennial open
- Status: Active
- Construction cost: ₹125 crore (US$13 million)
- Website: buddha-smriti-park.com

Buddha Smriti Park is also known as Buddha Memorial Park (as translated in English) is an urban park located on Frazer Road near Patna Junction in Patna, India. This park has been designed by Vikram Lall and developed by the Bihar Government to commemorate the 2554th birth anniversary of the Buddha. This park was inaugurated by the 14th Dalai Lama.

== Overview ==
The park has been constructed at the place where once the historical Bankipur Central Jail of British era existed. After a new central jail was built at Beur on the outskirts of Patna, the old jail become redundant. The park is a brainchild of the Chief Minister of Bihar, Nitish Kumar. Tibetan spiritual leader, Dalai Lama, on 27 May 2010 inaugurated Buddha Smriti Park and planted two saplings one was brought from Bodh Gaya and the other from Anuradhapura in Sri Lanka of the sacred Bodhi tree. A branch of the original Mahabodhi tree at Bodh Gaya is believed to have been taken to Anuradhapura in Sri Lanka by Emperor Ashoka's son Mahendra. The Sri Lankan delegation had brought a sapling from this tree to be planted at the Buddha Smriti Park.

The central attraction of this park is the stupa, known as Patliputra Karuna Stupa, 200 feet high, situated in the middle of the park. This 22-acre park located in the heart of city house the pot containing holy ashes of Buddha inside the main stupa. Previously the pot containing ashes of Buddha was for display in Patna Museum, pot was earlier excavated from Vaishali. The park has a museum, where Buddhist relics from Japan, Myanmar, South Korea, Sri Lanka and Thailand have been installed.

The park is also having meditation hall for prayers. The entry charge is ₹20 per individual be it child or an elder person. It now has a tall statue of Buddha.

== Attractions ==
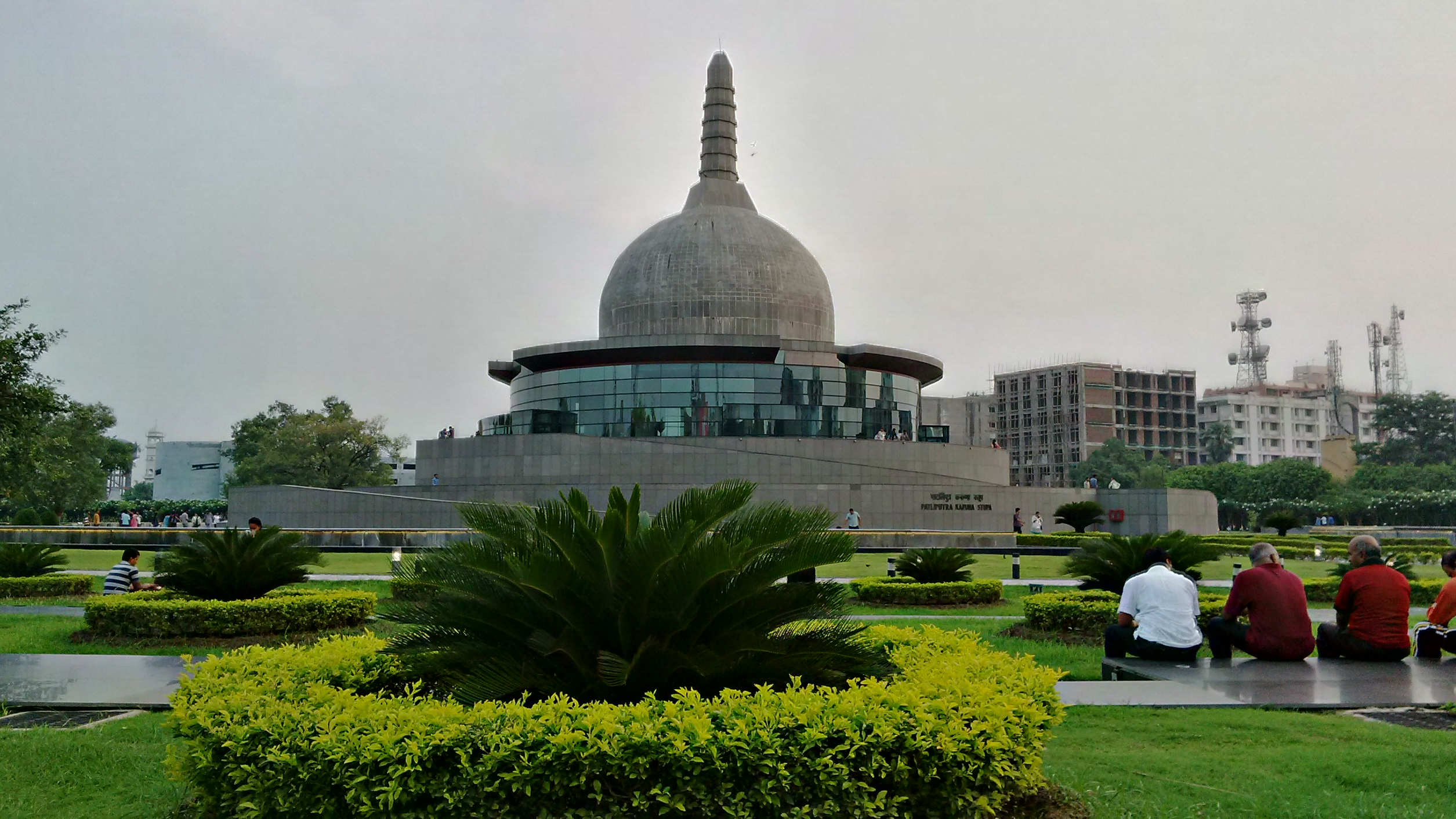
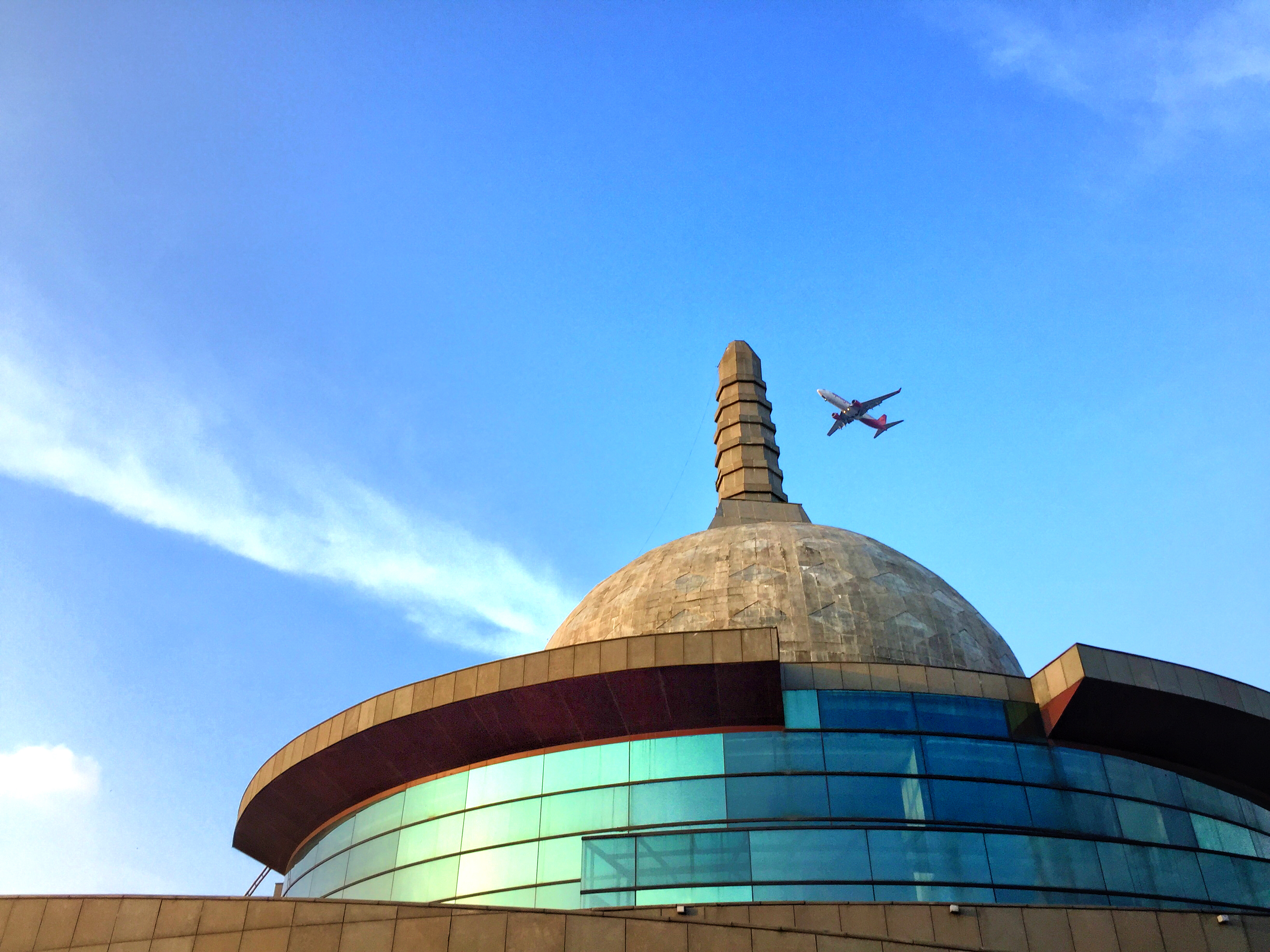
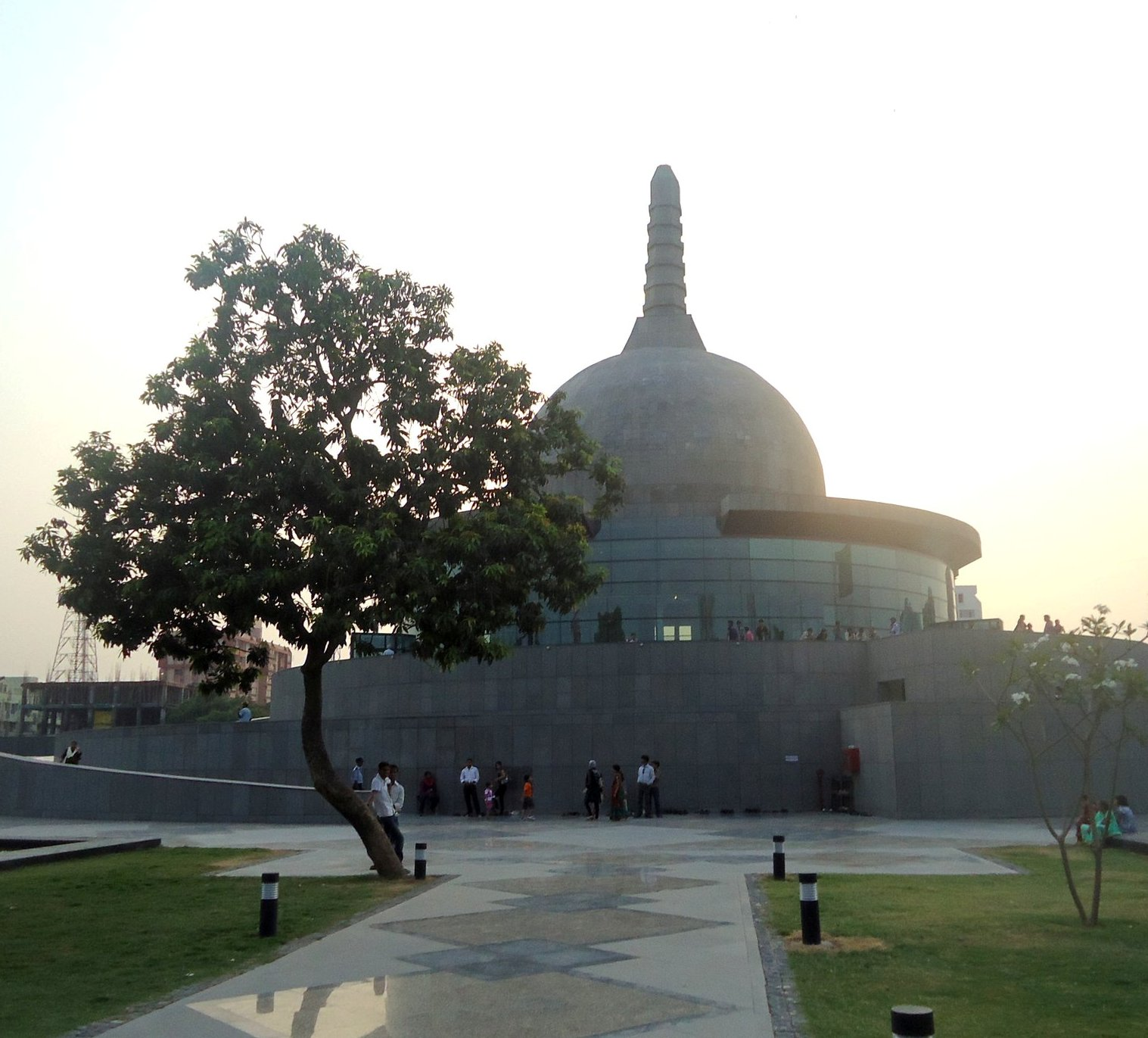
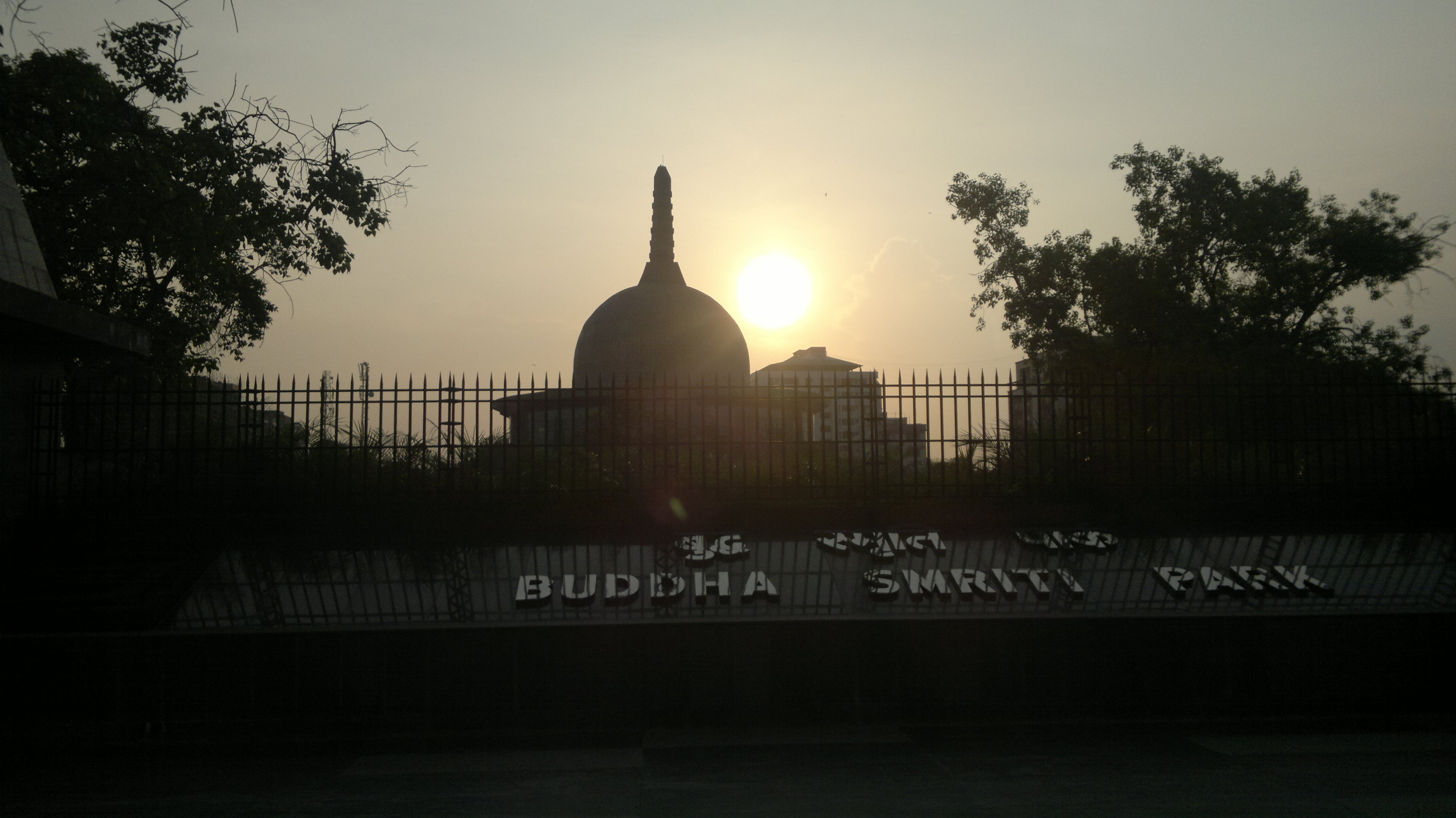
Patliputra Karuna Stupa

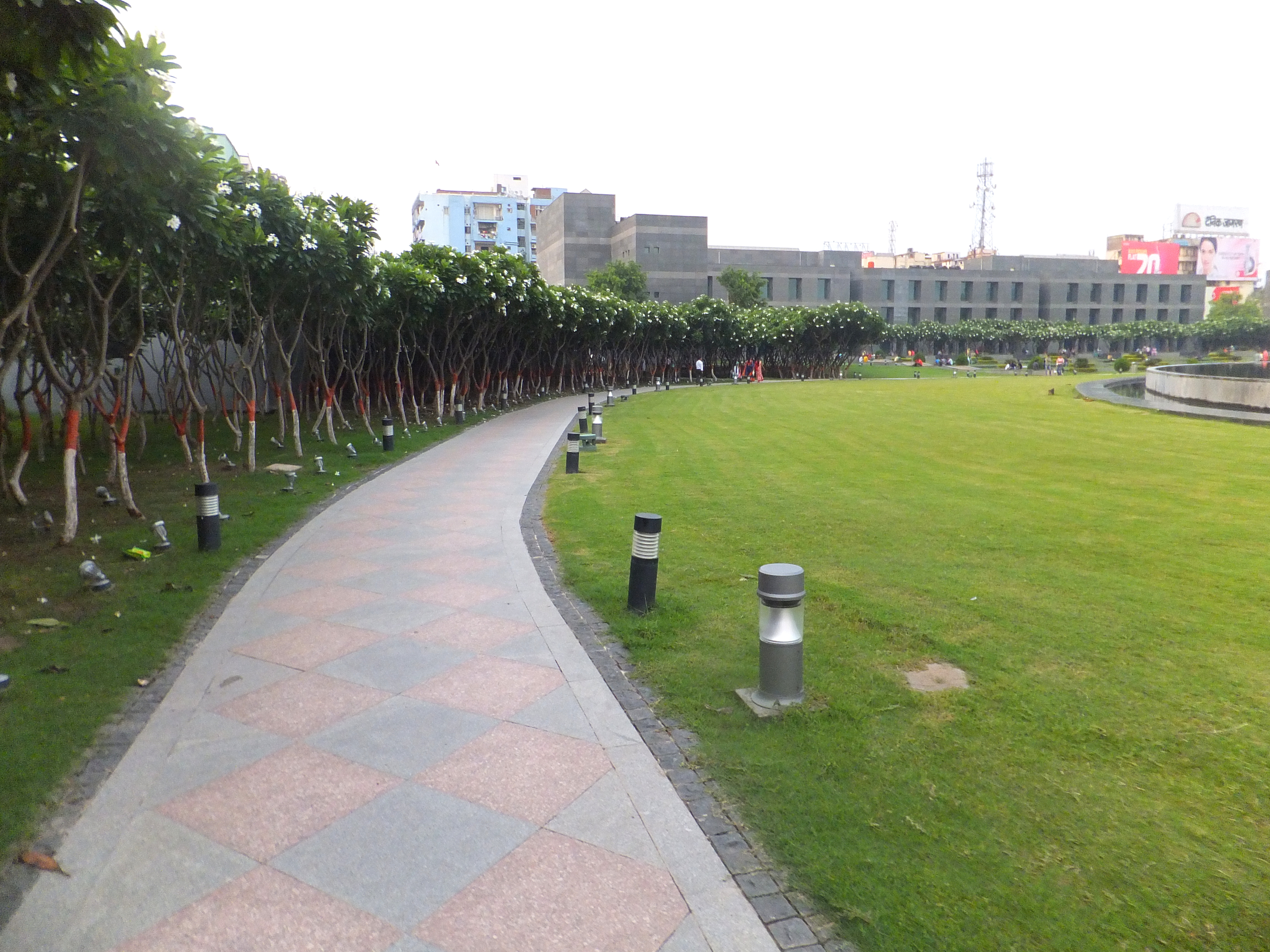
Walkway through the garden

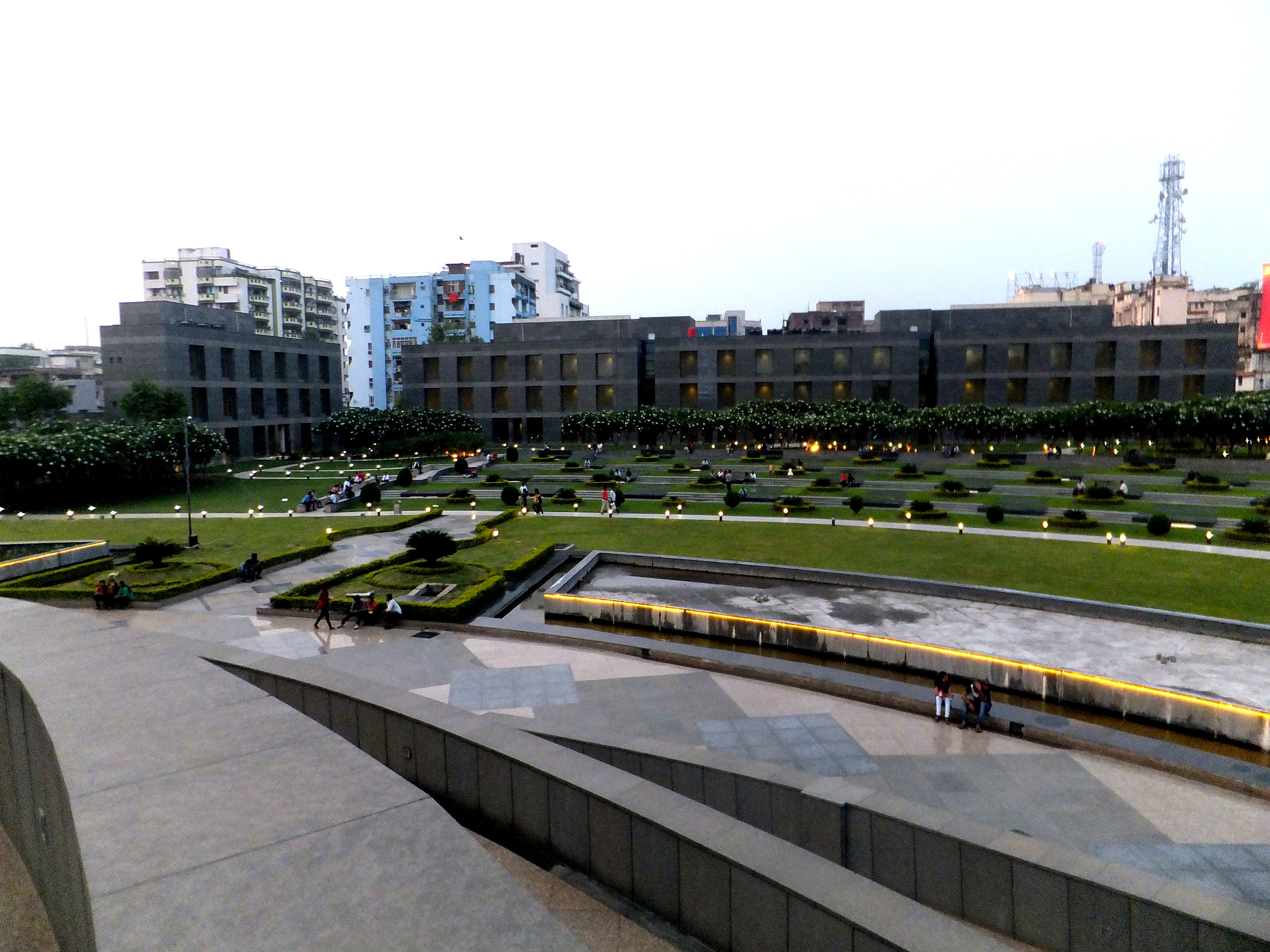
Path leading into the Meditation centre

=== Laser show ===
There is a laser show in the park in the evenings. The show is related to the history of Bihar from the time of Ramayana to post Independence.

=== Meditation centre ===
The Meditation Centre has been developed to create a unique facility dedicated to the derived from plan of the monasteries in the ancient Mahavihara of Nalanda. It consists of a total of 60 air conditioned cells, each having a view of the Stupa enshrining the sacred relics of Sakyamuni Buddha. Its library has books on Buddhism along with a large Audio-Visual Hall. The Hall has been designed to be used by the groups visiting the park.

=== Smriti Bagh (Park of Memories) ===
The park of memories is a landscaped open space which have votive stupas from countries across the world, each designed in the architectural pattern representative of the specific country. The park symbolically represents the dispersion of Buddhism from Bihar to various regions of the world. It has a seating capacity of around 5000 people.

=== Museum ===
The museum building impersonates the free flowing natural form of the Buddhist Cave Monasteries of India that evolved from the earliest examples of Barabar Caves found in Bihar. The museum will showcase the life and times of Buddha through original artefacts, 3-D models, audio — visual medium and multimedia presentations.

=== Stupa ===
The stupa enshrining the holy relics of the Sakyamuni Buddha, is the focal point of the Buddha Smriti Park. Ambulatory paths around the stupa for parikrama have been provided at three levels that lead to the highest level of the building. The relics are enshrined within the secure glass structure of the stupa and is accessible for viewing. Holy relics from Japan, Myanmar, South Korea, Thailand, Sri Lanka and Tibet can be seen here.

=== Bodhi trees ===
The park has saplings of holy Bodhi trees which have been received from Mahameghavana Anuradhapura, Sri Lanka and Bodh Gaya, India.

== See also ==
- Cetiya
- Relics associated with Buddha
- Global Vipassana Pagoda
- Buddha Samyak Darshan Museum and Memorial Stupa
- Eco Park
- Bihar Museum
- Prakash Punj
