= Buddha Samyak Darshan Museum and Memorial Stupa =

Buddhist shrine in India

- Location within India Location within Bihar
- Type: Stupa
- Location: Vaishali district, Bihar, India
- Coordinates: 25.99°N 85.13°E
- Area: 72 acres (29 ha)
- Status: Under construction
- Budget: ₹315 crore

The Buddha Samyak Darshan Museum and Memorial Stupa is a proposed museum and stupa to house the sacred relics of the Buddha that were given to the king of Vaishali in the 6th century BCE. The relics were enshrined in the Buddha Vaishali stupa, then uncovered during an archeological excavation in the late 1950s or early 1960s. The museum and stupa are to be built at Vaishali, about 60 km from the Bihar state capital Patna.

The Bihar state cabinet approved its construction on 9 February 2013, and construction was commenced on 20 February 2019, inaugurated by Bihar chief minister Nitish Kumar. The museum will be built on 72 acres of land with a budget of ₹315 crore. The structure will be built of stone, with the Indian Institute of Technology Delhi providing technical support for its construction.

== History ==
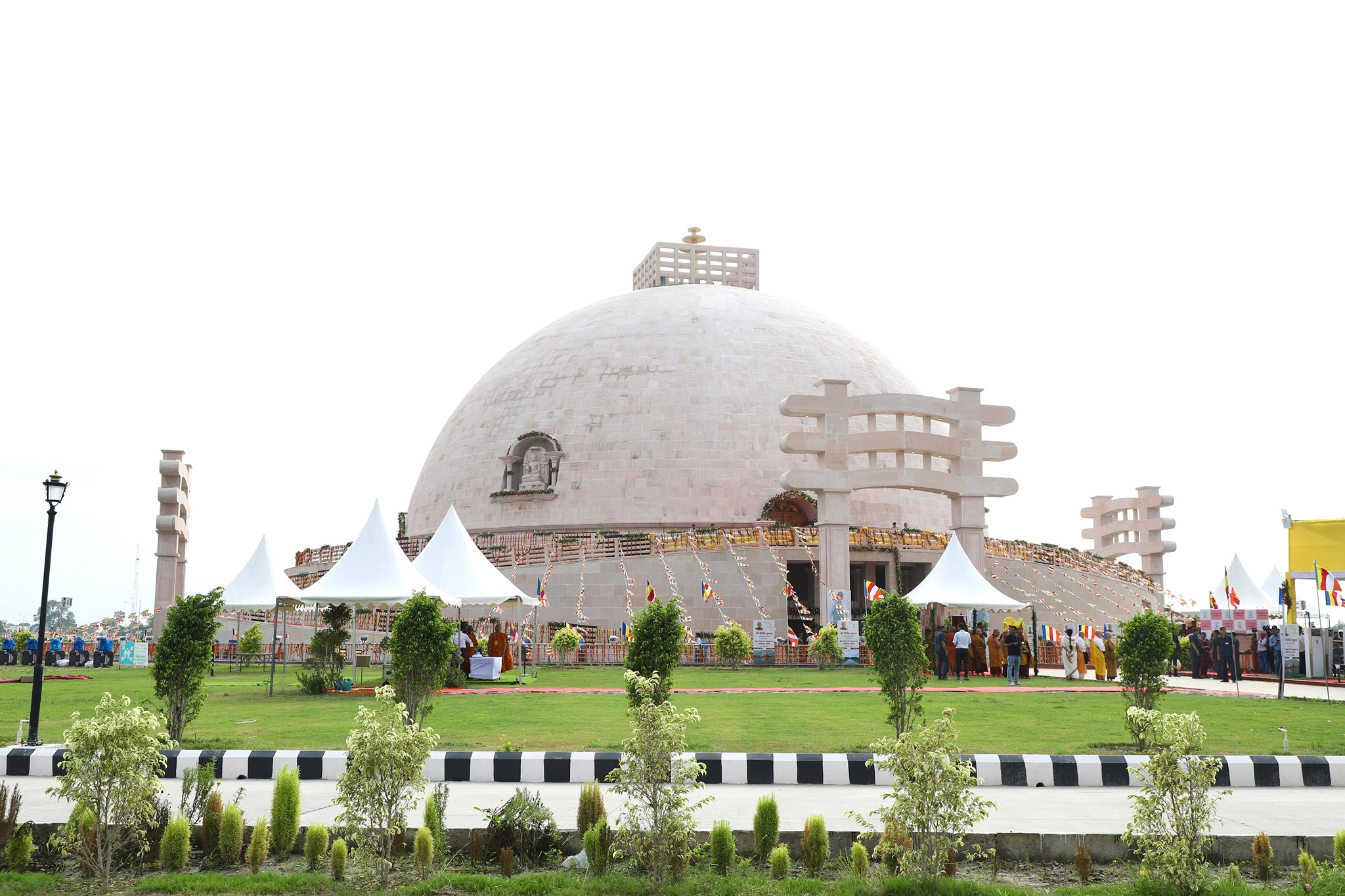
Budha Samyak Darshan Museum and Memorial Stupa in Vaishali.

The body relics of the Buddha, found in Vaishali, were in one of eight caskets that were given to eight kings who were to build stupas to enshrine his sacred body relics for the benefit of pilgrims and beings. The stupas are collectively are known as the Eight Stupas of the Sacred Relics. This casket containing holy relics of the Buddha would be the relics that were given to the Licchavi king of Vaishali after the Buddha attained mahaparinirvana at Kushinagar. One eighth of the Buddha's mortal remains were given to the Licchavi king. The relics were enshrined in the Relic Stupa of Vaishali, in the fourth century BCE. The relic casket containing the holy ashes of Gautama Buddha mixed with earth, a piece of conch, pieces of beads, a thin golden leaf and a copper punch marked coin, is currently kept at the Patna Museum.

The relic site was mentioned by the 7th century Chinese Buddhist monk Xuanzang in his book. Later, Anant Sadashiv Altekar uncovered the relic casket in a brick and clay stupa, dated to c.5th century BCE, during an archeological excavation between 1958 and 1960. Construction of the Buddha Samyak Darshan Museum and Memorial Stupa neared completion in July 2025, with the official inauguration scheduled for 29 July 2025 by Bihar Chief Minister Nitish Kumar. Built at a revised cost of ₹550.48 crore over 72 acres, the complex includes earthquake-resistant architecture using over 42,000 sandstone blocks from Vanshi Paharpur in Rajasthan, assembled without modern reinforcements. The museum houses the sacred bone relics of Gautama Buddha—unearthed between 1958 and 1962—on public display for the first time. Key features include a meditation center, amphitheatre, research library, visitor gallery, solar energy systems, and a large Buddha statue crafted in Odisha. The project was developed by Shapoorji Pallonji Group, with participation from over 15 Buddhist-majority countries anticipated at the inauguration event.

== Exhibition ==
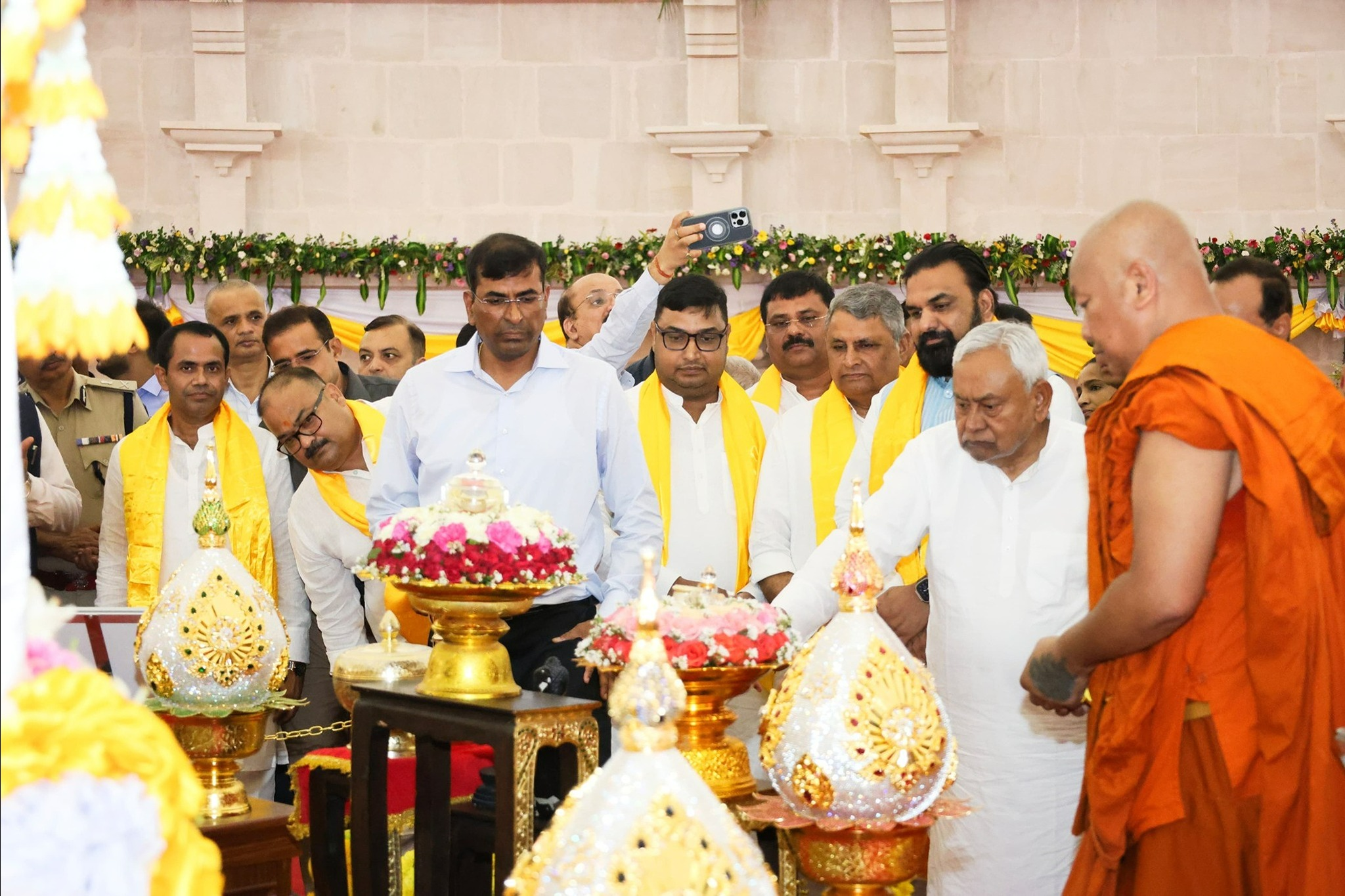
Leaders of Bihar, Nitish Kumar, Samrat Chaudhary, Jayant Raj Kushwaha, Umesh Singh Kushwaha, Siddharth Patel and others inaugurating Budhha Samyak Darshan Museum and Memorial Stupa in Vaishali.

According to the preliminary plan, the Buddha Samyak Darshan Sangrahalya is proposed to be developed on the line of the Global Vipassana Pagoda in Mumbai. It will have two components; a Buddha stupa and a Museum. There will be art and exhibition galleries with original artefacts, 3D models, multimedia presentation and an interpretation centre at the Museum. Animated short film will also be used to acquaint the visitors with the rich heritage of Buddhism. The stupa on the other hand will focus on Bihar and Buddha's Mahaparinirvana and major incidents of his life.

== See also ==
- Global Vipassana Pagoda
- Buddha Smriti Park
- Mahabodhi Temple
