= Lamdre =

Meditative system in Tibetan Buddhism

Lamdré is a meditative system in Tibetan Buddhism rooted in the view that the result of its practice is contained within the path. The name "lamdré" means the "path" (Wylie: lam) with its fruit Wylie: ‘bras). In Tibet, the lamdré teachings are considered the summum bonum of the Sakya school.

== History ==
According to traditional accounts, the lamdré teachings were originally bestowed upon Virūpa, an Indian monk, by the tantric deity Nairātmyā. By practicing the instructions given to him, Virūpa is said to have realized enlightenment. Hagiographical accounts of Virūpa's exploits record outrageous events, including binge drinking, seducing women, and destroying non-Buddhist (Skt. tīrtika) religious sites. Davidson suggests that this depiction shows the laxity of Buddhist morals during the Indian medieval period, but Wedemeyer suggests that the behavior shown in esoteric Buddhist hagiographies is intentionally scandalous, forming a social commentary on broader issues being discussed in the Indian religious milieu.

During his adventures in India, Virūpa converted the Hindu yogin Kāṇha (also called Kṛṣṇa, Wylie: nag po pa) and wrote the Vajra Verses as a guide to Kāṇha's meditations. The teachings were passed from mentor to student in India until they reached the sage Gayadhara.

Lamdré entered Tibet through the Indian paṇḍita Gayadhara (d. 1103) in 1041. Gayādhara worked with a Tibetan lotsawa, Drogmi Śākya Yeshe (Wylie: 'brog mi śākya ye shes, 993-1077?), to translate a plethora of Buddhist tantras from Indian classical and vernacular languages. Drogmi himself spent considerable time in India and Nepal learning both the exoteric and esoteric teachings of Mahayana Buddhism, and was both an accomplished scholar and meditation master when he returned to Tibet. Gayādhara transmitted the entire Lamdré teaching to Drogmi, who in turn passed the teachings on to several other disciples.

A student of Drogmi Lotsāwa, Chos bar, instructed Sachen Künga Nyingpo, who is considered the founder of the Sakya school of Tibetan Buddhism. Sachen mastered the teachings over a period of eighteen years and wrote several explications of the root text of the Lamdré system. He instructed his two sons, Loppön Sönam Tsemo and Jetsün Dragpa Gyaltsen, who themselves became accomplished masters of lamdré. The teachings became fully incorporated into the Sakya school and grew to be the main practice of the Sakyapa.

== Early lineage ==
- Virupa
- Krishnapa and Dombipa
- Damarupa
- Avadhutipa
- Gayadhara (994–1043)
- Drogmi Lotsaba (992–1074)
- Khon Konchog Gyalpo (1034–1102) (tantra), Zhangton Chobar (1053–1156) (pith)
- Sachen Kunga Nyingpo (1092–1158)
- Sonam Tsemo (1142–1182)
- Jetsun Dakpa Gyaltsen (1147–1216)
- Sakya Pandita Kunga Gyeltsen (1182–1251)
- Drogon Chogyal Phagpa (1235–1280)

== As practice ==
The lamdré system is rooted in a very specific view, that the path and its result are contained within each other. All beings have an inherently enlightened nature; however, due to afflictive obscurations, they are prevented from recognizing this nature. The path to Buddhahood, then, aims at removing these obscurations and experiencing the liberated existence of nirvāṇa.

Jetsün Dragpa Gyaltsen summarized the path into five stages:

1. Initiation
2. The creation stage
3. The completion stage
4. Training
5. Concluding practice with tantric seals

The view that saṃsāra (cyclical existence) and nirvāṇa (liberation from suffering) are indivisible illuminates the Lamdré teachings. To enter the path, a student must be consecrated (Skt. abhiṣeka) by an authentic mentor (Skt. guru, Tibetan lama), who instructs the student on how to recognize his or her own buddha-nature. Initiation into the system of practice is crucial because it shows the Lamdré practitioner the result of the path, the wisdom of a buddha.

After being consecrated, the student then engages in the practices of the path. The path includes specific meditations and yogic exercises that aim to remove the adventitious obscurations that are the cause suffering. As with most Anuttarayoga Tantra systems, the Lamdré practitioner will engage in two stages of meditation, the creation stage (Wylie: bskyed rim), where the meditator attempts to embody the awake nature of a buddha, and the completion stage (Wylie: rdzogs rim), which includes yogic meditations on various parts of the tantric anatomy. These practices directly purify obscurations.

In the lamdré tradition, the instructions for meditation are passed orally from mentor to student. As with all tantric Buddhist lineages, in the lamdré tradition, maintaining the secrecy of the teachings is extremely important. This is a reason why the consecration and initiation of the student into the tradition is strongly emphasized. Although eventually teachers like Sachen Künga Nyingpo wrote down oral instructions, originally, the important texts were memorized by the students. This tradition continues to the present day, where some oral teachings remain unwritten, known only by lamdré lineage holders.

== Literature ==
The root text of the lamdré tradition is Virūpa's Vajra Verses (Wylie: rdo rje tshig rkang). These verses form the basis of practice, explicate the view of the inseparability of saṃsāra and nirvāṇa, and allude to experiences on the path. Because of the cryptic nature of the topics contained in the Vajra Verses, secret instructions (Skt. upadeśa) from the mentor are required to make use of them. Within the tradition of Lamdré literature, eleven commentaries on the Vajra Verses were written by Sachen Künga Nyingpo. Other volumes of importance include the Pod ser by Jetsün Dragpa Gyaltsen and the Pod nag by Lama Sönam Gyaltsen.

Although the Vajra Verses are considered the essence of the lamdré teachings, the actual practice of the system comes from the Hevajra tantra and its supplemental explanatory tantras.

The Lam ‘bras is a system of tantric theory and practice based generally on all the anuttarayoga tantras, specifically on the three scriptures known as the Kye rdor rgyud gsum (The Tantra Trilogy of Hevajra), and especially on the Hevajra tantra itself.

The Vajra Verses elucidate the experiences that one will have while practicing the tantric liturgy (Skt. sādhanā) of the deity Hevajra. However, although, traditionally the Lamdré is intimately connected with the Hevajra Tantra, because of the ambiguous language of the Vajra Verses, other tantric systems could theoretically be used in the creation stage, as Sachen does in his Yum don ma commentary, where he connects the Vajra Verses to the Cakrasaṃvara Tantra for the creation stage meditations.

Within the sub-sects of the Sakya school, there are unique traditions of lamdré instructions. Certain controversies of the types of practices included in some traditions occurred, but eventually most Sakyapas agreed that the Slob bshad teachings were the standard.
