= Vikram Lall =

Indian architect (died 2020)

Vikram Lall (died 27 December 2020) was an Indian architect and the principal architect and partner of Lall & Associates.

== Biography ==
Lall had a bachelor's degree in Architecture from the Chandigarh College of Architecture and had a master's degree in Interdisciplinary Design from the University of Cambridge.

He taught at several architectural schools in India and outside, and was also a Visiting Faculty at the School of Planning and Architecture in New Delhi. He was the founder of the non-profit organization Society for Art Appreciation and Research (SAAR).

Lall died on 27 December 2020, in Brussels, Belgium from heart-related complications. While his age was not disclosed, he was noted to be in his late 50s.

== Notable projects ==
Lall was a design management consultant in the creation of the Indian School of Business and aided in the design of Buddha Smriti Park.

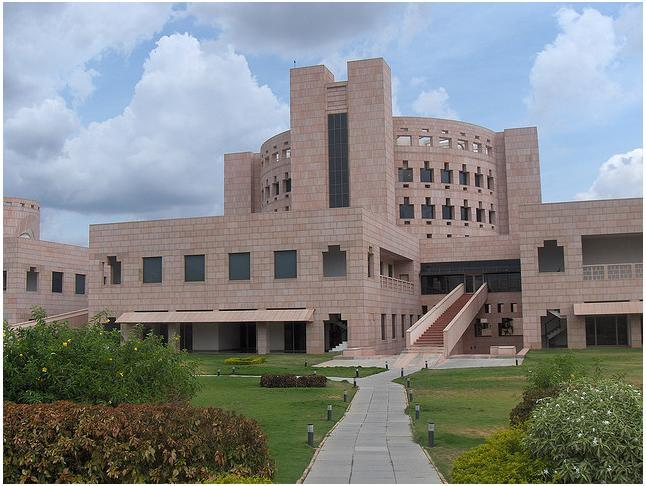
Indian School of Business, Hyderabad, India

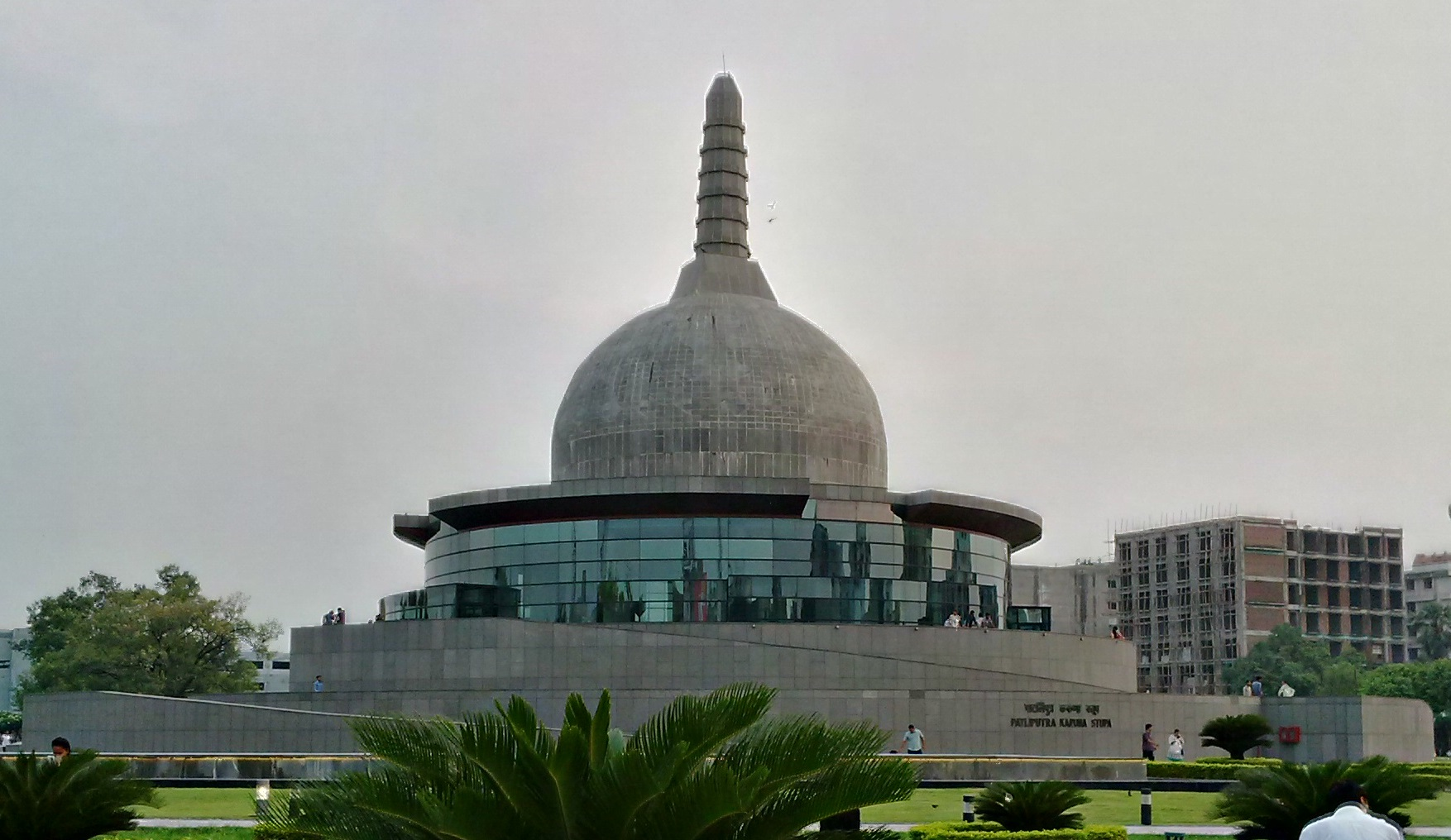
Buddha Smriti Park, Patna, India

== Bibliography ==
- Lall, Vikram (2011). Sacred Spaces: Architecture of the Buddhist World. W W Norton & Company Incorporated. ISBN 978-962-217-754-3.
- Lall, Vikram (2014). The Golden Lands: Cambodia, Indonesia, Laos, Myanmar, Thailand & Vietnam. Abbeville Press Publishers. ISBN 978-0-7892-1194-1.
