= Drogmi =

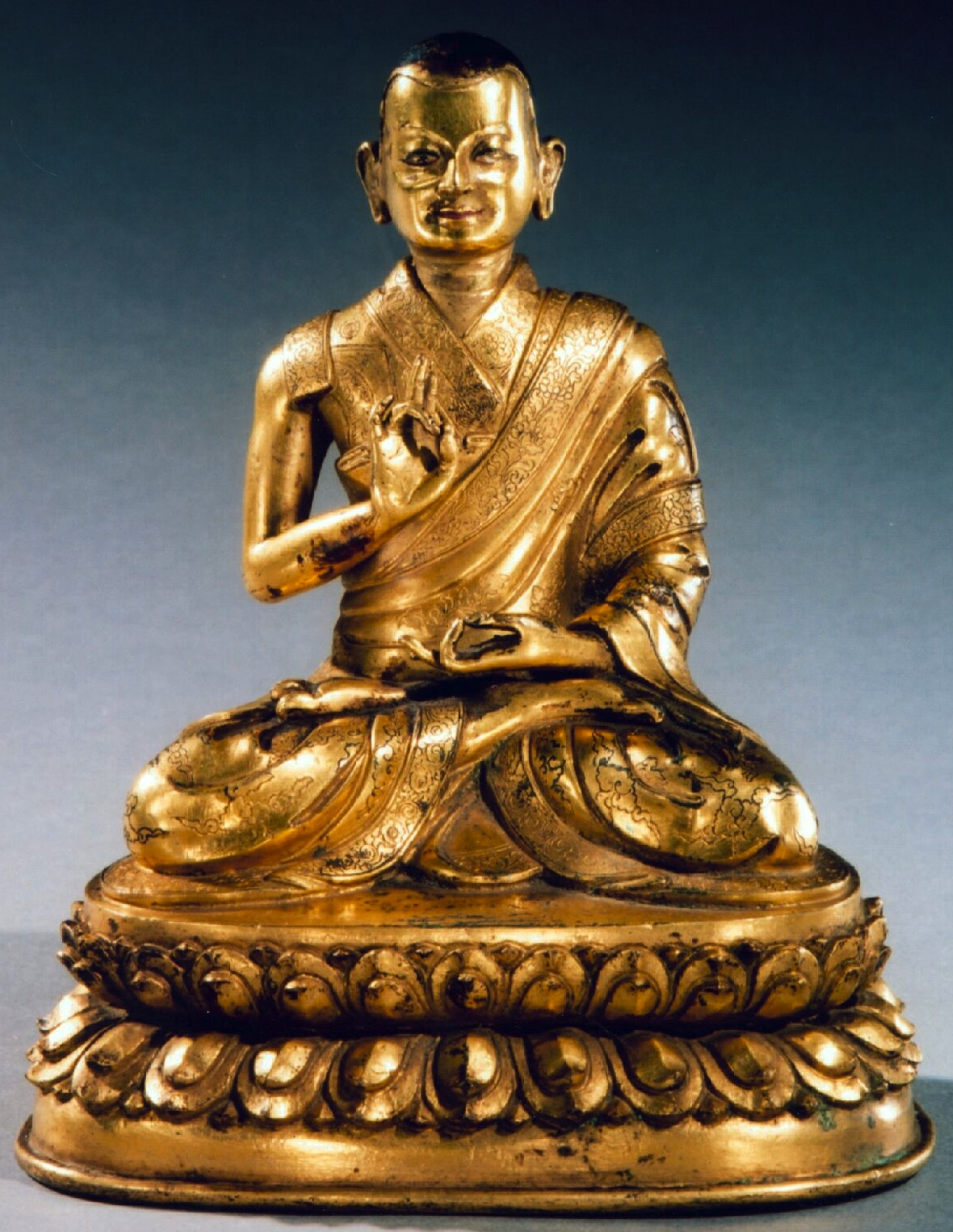
Drokmi Sakya Yeshe Lotsāwa

Drogmi (Drogmi Lotsāwa Śākya Yeshe) (c. 992–1064) transmitted the tantric system "Path and Fruit" (Lamdré) which came to be the central esoteric tradition of the Sakya school of Tibetan Buddhism. Drogmi was a famous scholar and translator who had studied at the Vikramashila monastery directly under Naropa, Ratnākaraśānti, Vāgīśvarakīrti and other great panditas from India for twelve years. He is famous for his beard.

He was also initiated into the Lamdre school by the Indian master, Gayadhara.
