= Relic Stupa of Vaishali =

Archaeological site in India

Vaishali relic stupa
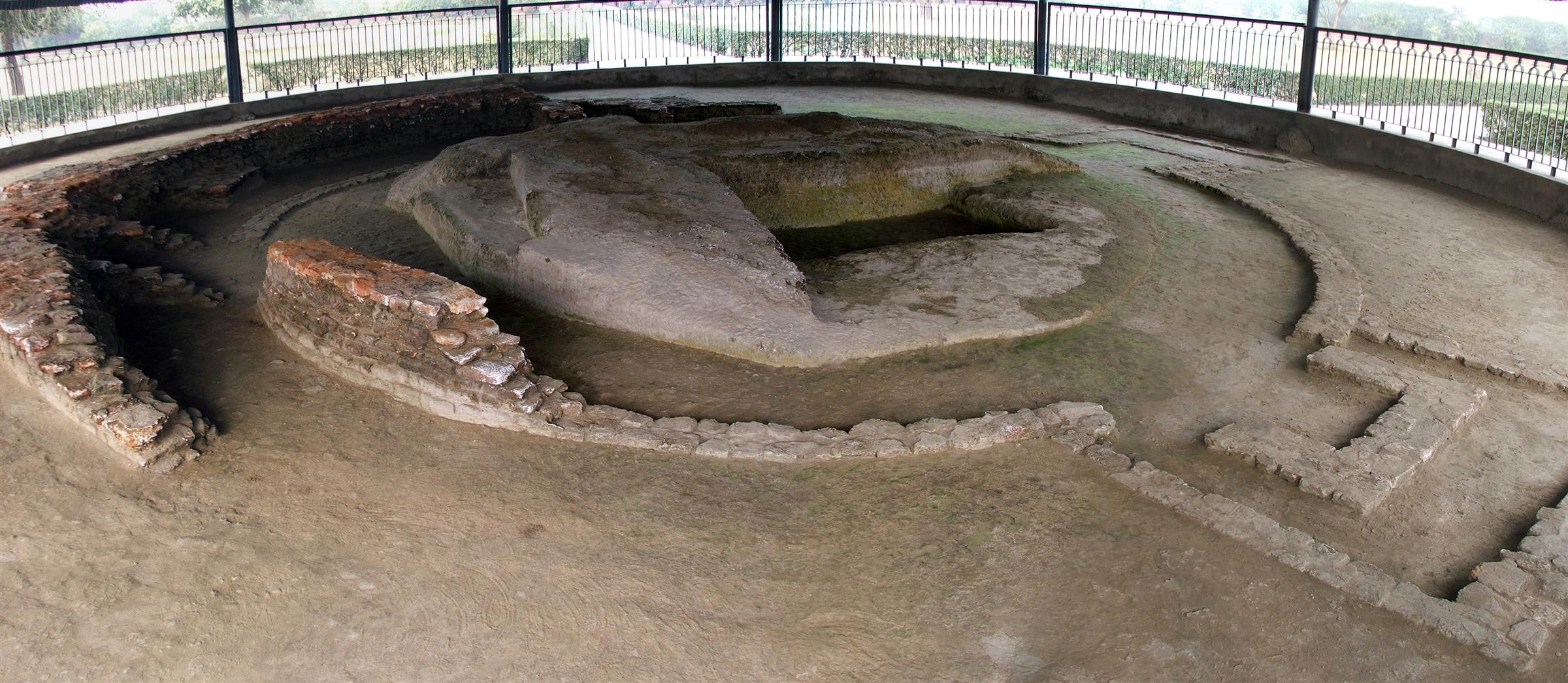
- The relic stupa of Vaishali

- Location in Vaishali

Religion
- Affiliation: Buddhism
- Status: Preserved

Location
- Location: Vaishali, Vaishali district, Bihar, India
- Interactive map of Vaishali relic stupa
- Administration: Licchavis of Vaishali
- Coordinates: 25.99°N 85.13°E

Architecture
- Type: Stupa
- Style: Buddhist
- Completed: c. 5th century BCE
- Materials: Clay, brick and earth

The Relic Stupa of Vaishali is a brick and clay stupa built by the Licchavi king to contain relics of the Buddha. It has been dated to c. 5th century BCE and is considered to be the earliest archaeologically known stupa. Since 2010, the stupa has been considered a tentative site under the UNESCO World Heritage Sites list, in the category of the Silk Road sites in India.

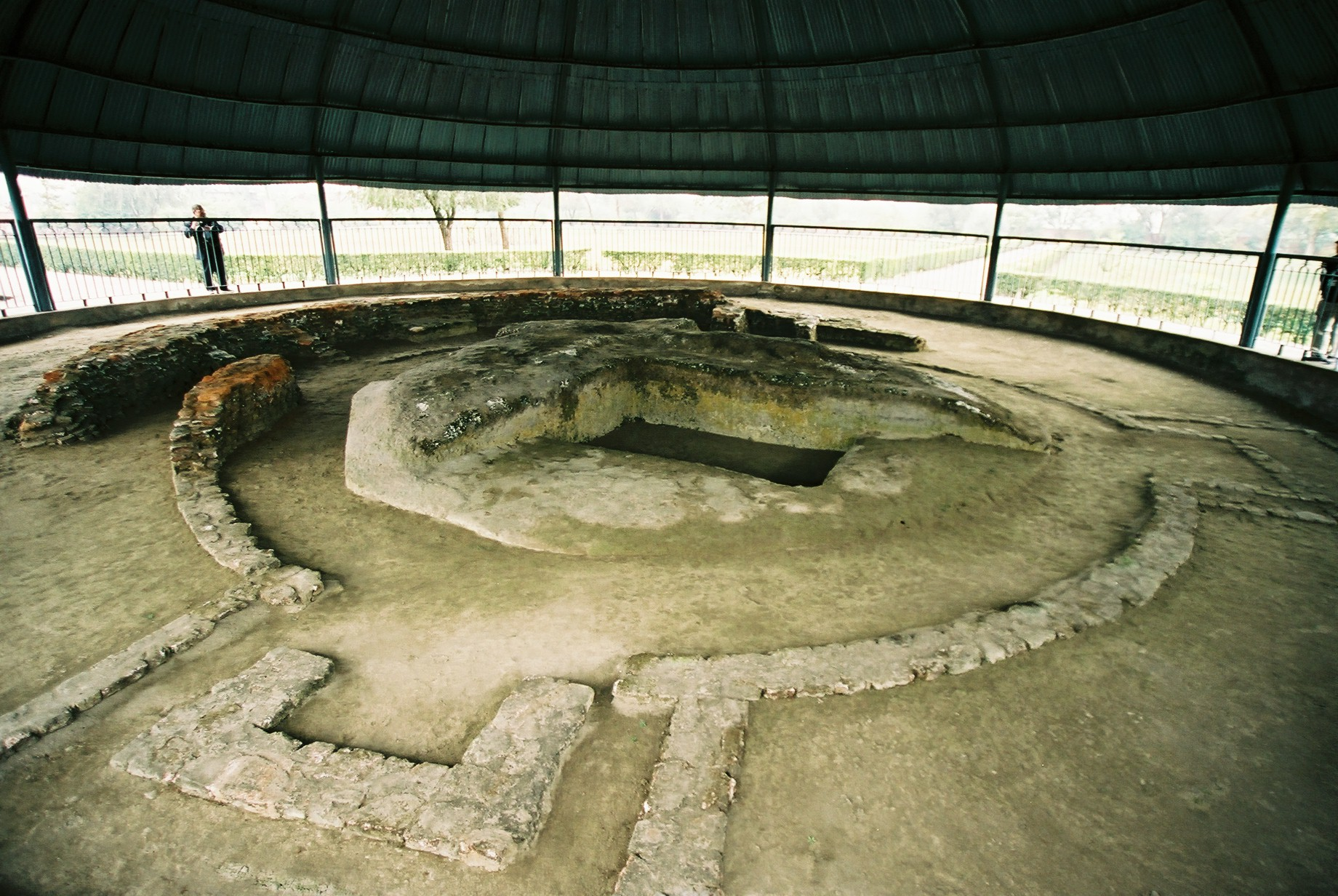
Buddha's Relic Stupa, Vaishali, Bihar

== History ==
Vaishali formed the capital of the Licchavis who ruled from up until 468 BCE. The stupa itself was uncovered in 1958 following excavations at the site. The stupa itself is made of brick and has a clay core that has been enlarged several times. The excavators noted that the final brick addition was contemporary with a nearby 3rd century BCE Mauryan empire column which would therefore mean that the clay core predated the Mauryans. They also found that the relics within the stupa had been removed at a later date. This would match up with the history of Ashoka who is said to have redistributed the relics of the Buddha in the 3rd century BCE.

Sri Lankan sources including the Mahāparinibbāna Sutta have stated that the Licchavis of Vaishali were one of the groups that were designated to receive a portion of the cremated remains of the Buddha and that they built a shrine/stupa to enshrine it at their capital. Thus it can be stated that this clay stupa held either one of the original Eight Great Relic Stupas of the Buddha's remains or held the ashes from the Buddha's cremation which were to be given to the Buddha's family at Kapilvastu, as detailed in the Sutta. The description of the casket's contents was "ashy earth, and also contained a piece of gold leaf, two glass beads, a small conch and a punch-marked copper coin", which describes more closely the ash relics than the bone relics. The relic casket itself has been kept at Patna Museum since 1972.

The original structure measured 26' in diameter at its base. The enlargements of the stupa took place in three phases and had four platforms that pointed in the four cardinal directions, possibly so that offerings could be placed on them.

== Preservation ==
Despite the site being protected by the Archaeological Survey of India, concerns were raised in 2014 about possible security and management issues that are affecting the site. Due to flooding in the region and a lack of drainage, waterlogging has been noted to be a potential threat to the stupa's structural integrity. There are also no security guards deputed at the site.
