= Gayadhara =

Indian Buddhist master and scholar

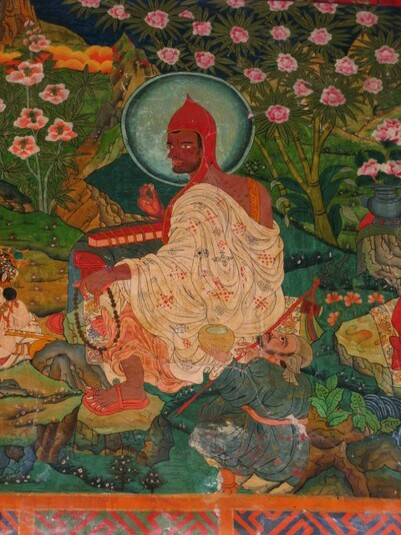
- Painting of Gayadhara from the 15th century

Personal life
- Born: c. 11th century Vaishali (modern-day Bihar, India)
- Died: c. 1103 Tibet

Religious life
- Religion: Buddhism
- School: Vajrayana

Senior posting
- Students: Drogmi

Gayadhara (d. 1103 CE) was an 11th century Indian Buddhist master and scholar and one of teachers who spread the Lamdre doctrine in Tibet from which he was instructed by the teacher, Virupa. He was also the teacher of the Tibetan monk, Drogmi.

He is considered to be one of the more eccentric figures in Indian Buddhist history.

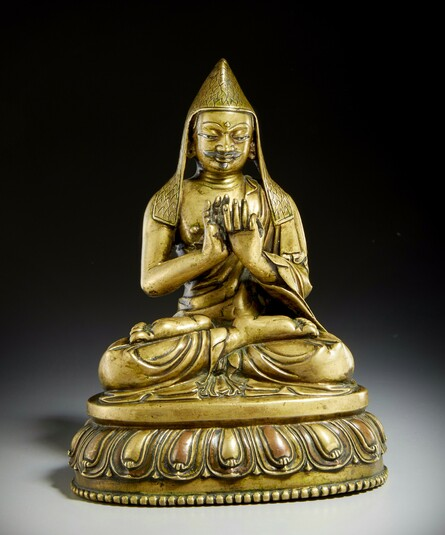
Metal sculpture of Gayadhara, created in 1400 - 1499

== Life ==
The scholars, Rahul Sankrityayan and K. P. Jayaswal, both state that Gayadhara was born in Vaishali in the modern state of Bihar in India. The twelfth-century Tibetan writer, Jetsun Dragpa Gyaltsen writes that Gayadhara belonged to the Kayastha caste of scribes and the sixteenth-century writer, Khyentse Wangchuk, states that his family worked in service of a king of Candrarūpa. The Kayastha caste that Gayadhara belonged to had produced numerous other tantric masters. Tibetan writers, like Pawo Tsuglag Threngwa, also make it clear that Gayadhara was a lay practitioner (Upāsaka) and not an ordained monk and in paintings he is commonly depicted wearing the white robes of a layman in contrast to the red robes of a monk. This is further evidenced by the fact that Gayadhara had a family and one of Gayadhara's sons became an accomplished scholar in his own right and was a disciple of Naropa and Maitripa.

In terms of Gayadhara's own education, he was initiated into the lamdre doctrine by his teacher Avadhuti. He is said to have first encountered Avadhuti on the banks of the Lohit River in what is now North Eastern India where Avadhuti was practising as a naked ascetic. He also received instruction from a Brahmin named Sridhara and received initiation into the Arali tantras by a Sri Lankan yogini by the name of Candramala.

The sources on his life disagree on how many times Gayadhara visited Tibet, with some stating he visited on three occasions and some stating that he visited four times. The confusion seems to have arisen because Gayadhara likely used pseudonyms when visiting Tibet. The scholar, Cyrus Stearns, believes that through looking at the sources, it is clear that Gayadhara visited Tibet on three occasions.

=== First visit ===
His first visit took place when Gayadhara sent a message to Drogmi to come and welcome him to the borders of Tibet. Gayadhara initially received the idea to visit Tibet after receiving a prophetic dream from the bodhisattva, Avalokiteśvara. Cha rgan relates an incident regarding his first visit to Tibet of how one day Gayadhara appeared outside Drogmi's home in Tibet asking for food and money. Over the course of the interaction, Gayadhara eventually took on the role of Sanskrit teacher to Drogmi and initiated him into the Lamdre.

=== Second visit ===
Gayadhara first met Go Khukpa Lhetse in Nepal. Go Khukpa Lhetse wished to compete with his former teacher Drogmi and invite the famed Indian Buddhist master, Maitripa to Tibet. While in Nepal, Gayadhara approached Go Khukpa Lhetse and declared to him "I am Maitripa". Go Khukpa Lhetse then brought Gayadhara with him to Tibet under the false impression that he was Maitripa. From Gayadhara, Go Khukpa Lhetse received many tantric initiations and instructions. Ngor Chen states that during this second visit, Gayadhara also encountered Gö Lotsawa Zhönnu-pel and together they translated the Guhyasamāja Tantra.

=== Third visit ===
All sources agree that Gayadhara's last visit to Tibet was under the invitation of Gyijo lotsāwa Dawe Öser. During this visit, Gayadhara did not adopt any pseudonym and was simply known as Gayadhara and mainly spent his time in the Western regions of Tibet. Ngorchen Konchog Lhundrup notes that together, Gayadhara and Gyijo, completed many translations and commentaries and Gyijo received the Lamdre school transmission.

=== Death ===
The Zhib mo rdo tje records Gayadhara's final moments. He was sat with two disciples of Gyijo named Se and Rog in Kharak Töpu when he became aware of the fact that he would soon die. He stated:

"All my sons, you must not lack diligence in practice! Even though I only went back and forth between Tibet and India, and I have not practiced much when a mantra practitioner dies, he dies like this".

He is said to have sat in a cross-legged meditative posture and held a vajra and bell in both hands before he died.
