= Silk Road sites in India =

List of Indian Silk Road sites

Silk Road sites in India are sites that were important for trade on the ancient Silk Road. There are 12 such places in India. These are spread across seven states in India: Bihar, Jammu and Kashmir, Maharashtra, Puducherry, Punjab, Tamil Nadu and Uttar Pradesh. These sites are on tentative list of UNESCO World Heritage Sites.

== Ruins of ancient Vaishali ==
Kolhua

The excavations conducted by Archaeological Survey of India have unearth remains of Kuthagarshala, Swastika shaped monastery, a tank, a cluster of votive stupas, miniature shrines, main stupas and the Ashokan pillar. The main components of structure belong to period of Maurya Dynasty (3rd century BC) to Gupta Dynasty (7th century AD).

The pillar is 11.00 meters high is monolithic polished sandstone. This pillar is locally called Lat. It is Probably one of the earliest pillar of Emperor Ashoka The Great and does not bear usual edict, but few letters of shell character of Gupta Period are engraved on the pillar.

The brick stupa was erected to commemorate the event of offering honey to Buddha by the chief monkey. It was originally built in Maurya period (323 BC-232 BC) and subsequently enlarged in Kushan period (1st-2nd century A.D.) by raising height and providing brick paved the circumambulatory path. Further brick encasing took place in Gupata and post Gupta period.

The adjoining tank has been identified as Market Hard. This is supposedly dug for Buddha by monkeys. The bricks lined seven-tiered tank which is approximately 65 X 35 meters in dimension having two bathing ghats on southern and western wings.

Kutagarshala represents the spot where Buddha used to stay during rainy season at Vaishali. Excavations have discovered three phases of its construction. Originally it was a small Chaitya built during Shunga-Kushan period in (2nd-3rd century A.D.). It was enlarged to a lofty temple in second phase during Gupta period. In the third phase, it was converted to a monastery in post Gupta times by providing a number of partition walls.

The other monastery which looks like a swastika has 12 rooms, 3 on each arm attached to a common veranda which is around an open central courtyard. This monastery has its entrance towards east and toilet chambers attached to its southern wall. It was constructed in Gupta period probably for nuns.

Antiquities like beads of semi-precious stones, terracotta figurines, seals and sealings, bricks embedded with semi-precious stones, inscribed polished and a unique terracotta figure of crowded monkey found during excavations of the sites are kept on display for visitors in local site museum run by ASI.

Relic stupa

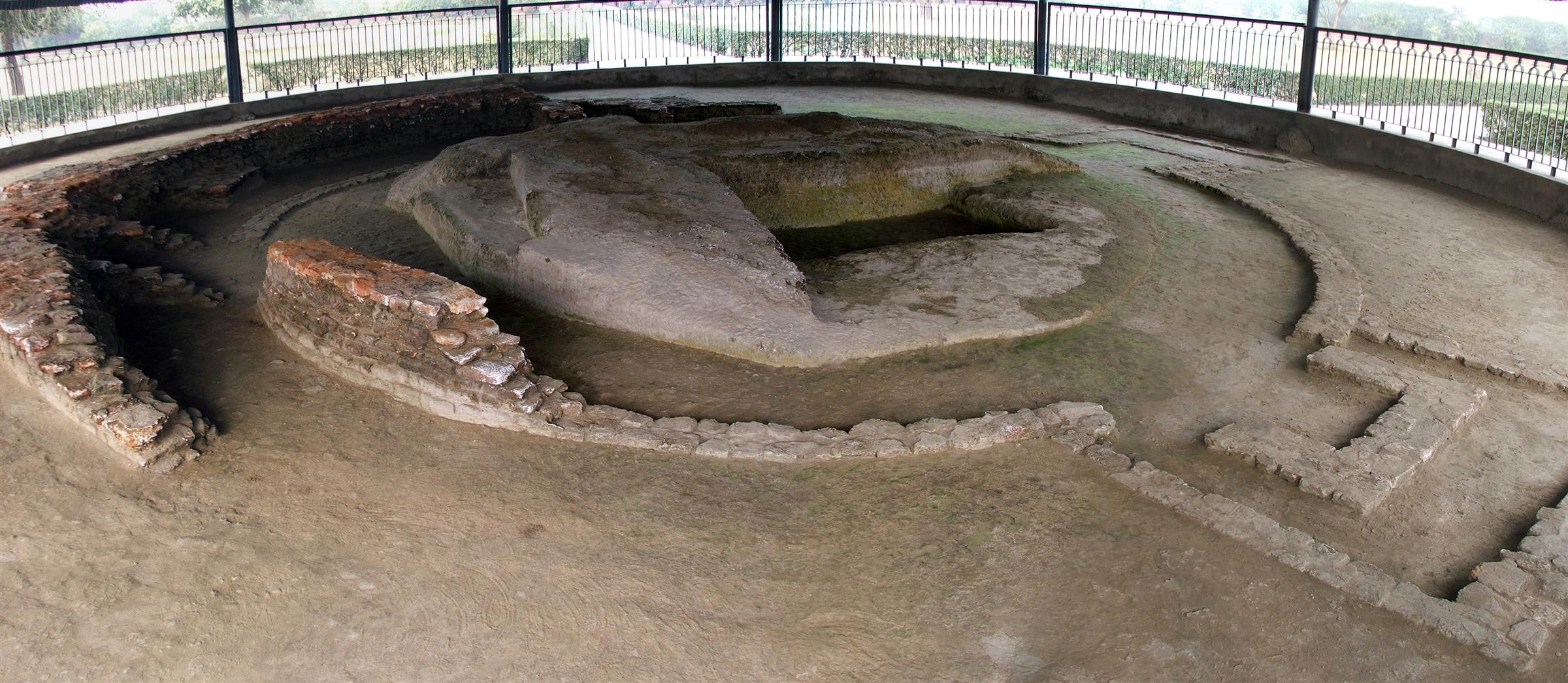
Remains at ancient Vaishali

The stupa has been identified as one of the eight stupas which contain corporeal remains of Buddha. Excavation of this site was done by K.P. Jayaswal Research Institute 1957–58. Originally it was mud stupa, smaller in dimension, erected by Lichhavis over their share of relic of Buddha in circa 5th century B.C. Ayakas noticed that southern and eastern sides are probably the earliest example of its kind. A soapstone casket found in the core of stupa contains ashy earth, a small conch, two glass beads, a small piece of gold leaf and a chopper punch marked on a coin. In Maurya, Shunga and Kushan period the stupa got its enlargement and diameter of stupa was increased by 17.1 meter.

== Remains of Vikramshila Ancient University ==
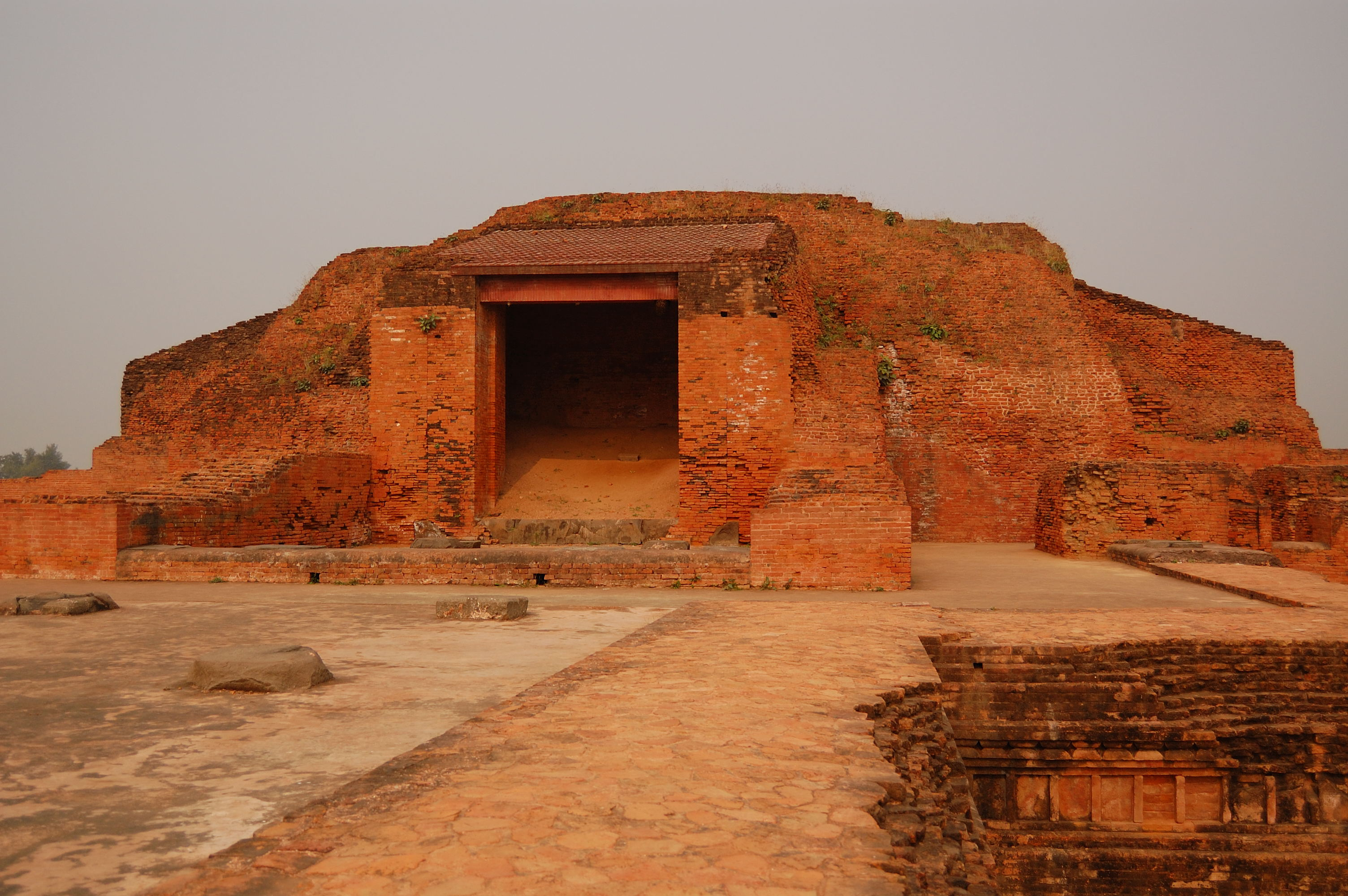
The Main stupa at the center, Bihar

The Property

Excavations have revealed a huge square monastery with a cruciform stupa in its center, a library building and cluster of votive stupas. To the north of the monastery, Tibetan and Hindu temple have been found. The monastery is huge square structure having each side of 330 meters. There are 208 rooms with 53 on each side of the monastery. The entire spread over is over hundred acres. On the wall there are decorative with mouldings and terracotta plaques which testify high excellent art of terracotta art of flouring in the region during Pala period (8th-12th century A.D.). Over the plaques are depicted many Buddhist, Hindu deities and human figures, animals, and birds.

The library building was air-conditioned by cooled water from the adjoining reservoir through a range of vents in the black well.

== Buddhist remains at Kushinagar ==
Description

The remains at Kushinagar are distributed in three sites the main site, Matha-Kuar shine, and the cremation stupa. The main site consists of the main stupa and Nirvana temple with the surrounding monuments.

== Sites ==
Name	Image	Location	Area (hectares)
Ruins at ancient Vaishali	Buddha's ashes Stupa, Vaishali, Bihar Ashoka Pillar, Vaishali, Bihar	Vaishali, Bihar	2.770 (Vaishali) 7.300 (Kolhua)
Remains at Vikramshila ancient university	Vikramshila ancient university Vikramshila ruins	Vikramshila, Bihar	42.35
Buddhish remains at Kushinagar	Kushinagar ruins, Kushinagar Kushinara Stupa	Kushinagar, Uttar Pradesh	6.400 (Kushinagar) 1.660 (Ramabhar)
Sravasti	Sravasti, India Buddha's hut Sravasti	Sravasti, Uttar Pradesh	164.814
Kaushambi	Kausambi Vihara	Kaushambi, Uttar Pradesh	362.341
Ahichhatra	Ahichchhatra Fort Temple	near Ramnagar, Bareilly District, Uttar Pradesh	362.341
Ancient site and Buddhist Stupa (Sanghol)	Sanghol Stupa site Part of excavation at Sanghol	Fatehgarh Sahib district, Punjab	220 m X 200 m
Arikamedu, Early historic site	Arikamedu ruins Arikemedu's ancient harbour	Puducherry	13.89
Excavated remains of Kaveripattinam (Excavated remains of Buddhish Vihara and temple at Pallavaneswaram-Melaiyur)		Nagapattinam District, Tamil Nadu	0.405
Ancient monastery and stupa together with adjacent land (Harwan)		Kashmir Valley, Jammu and Kashmir	74 Kanals 06 Marla
Locally Known as Burud Kot (Nalla Sopara Stupa)	Nalla Sopara Stupa	Nallasopara, Maharashtra	1.0415
Indraprastha (Old fort)	Old Fort, Delhi	NCT Delhi	19.010

== Map ==
Location of Silk Road Sites in India
