= Vaishali (ancient city) =

Historical city in Bihar, India

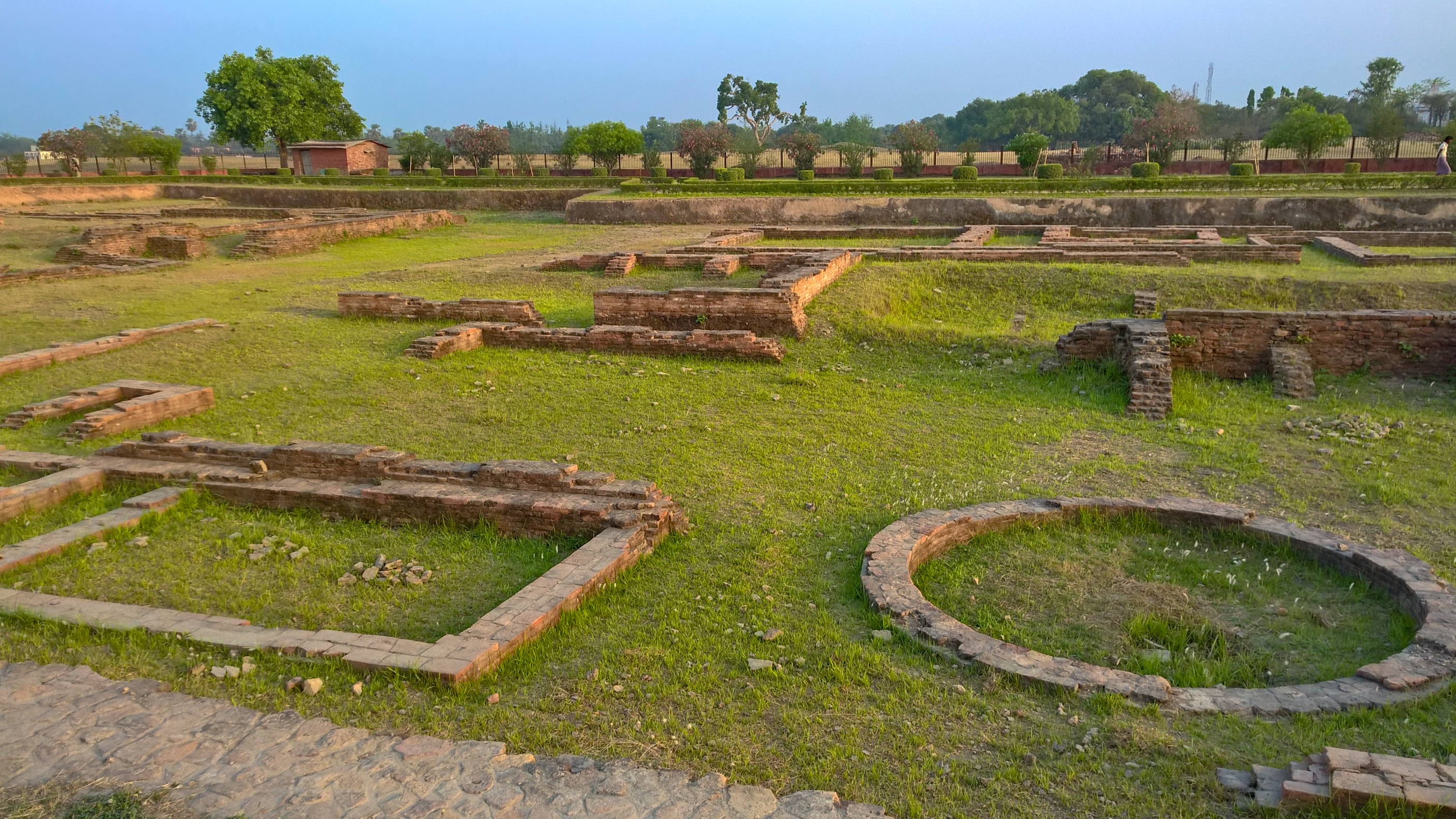
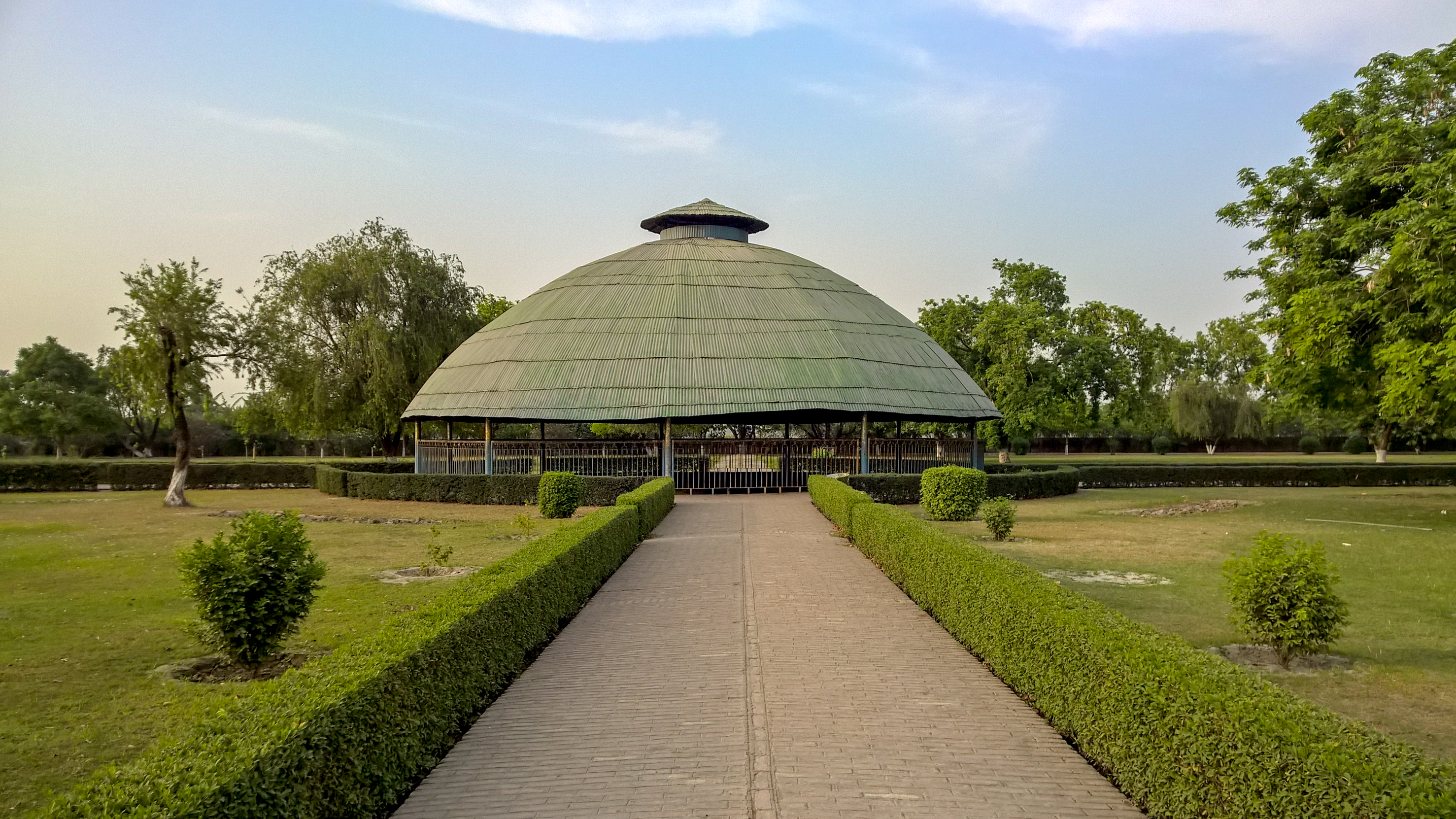
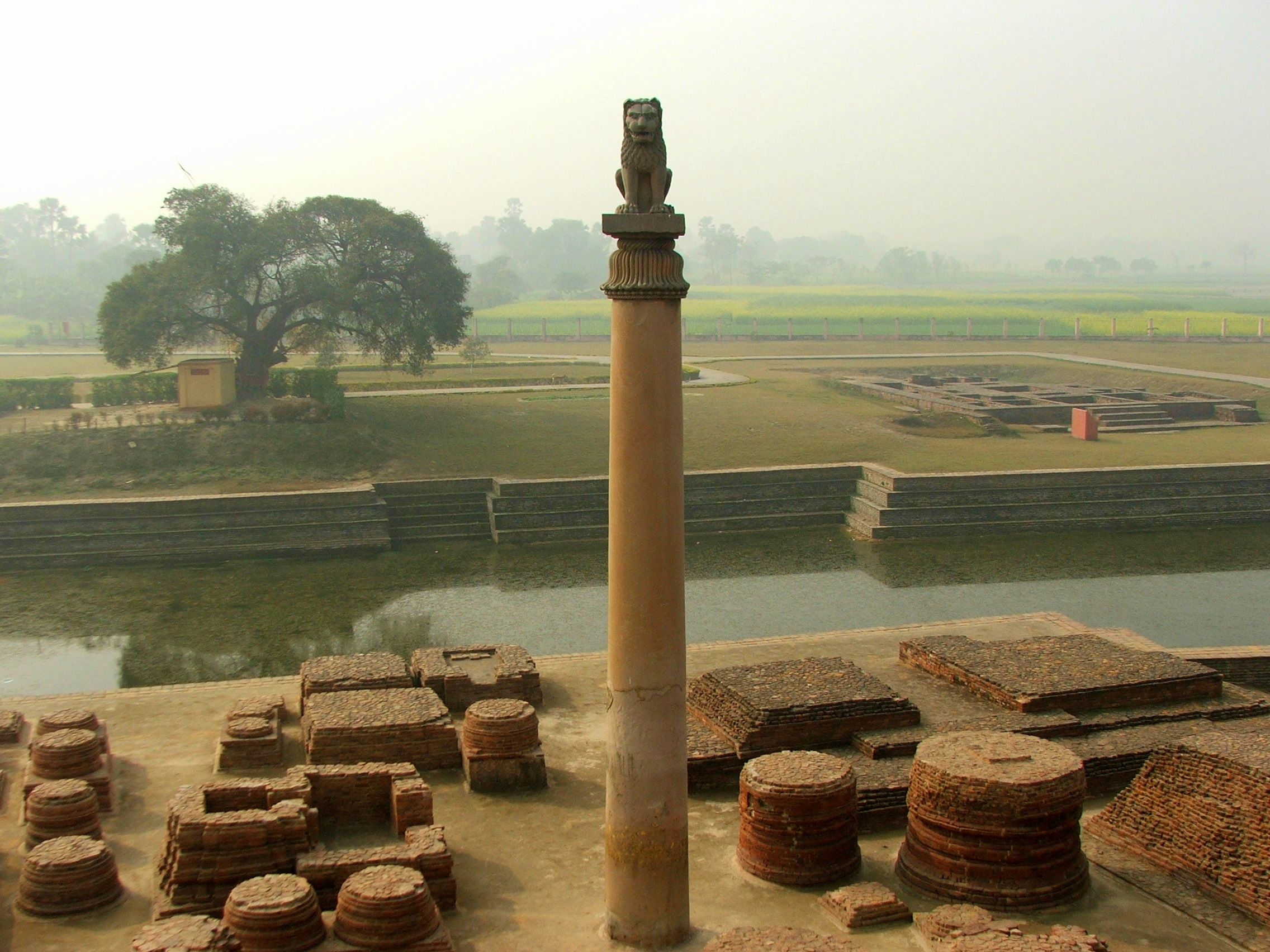
- Fort of Raja Visala, The Buddha's Relic Stupa of Vaishali, Asoka pillar at Kolhua
- Interactive map of Vaishali
- 26.0137°N 85.1090°E
- Type: Settlement
- Cultures: Licchavis of Vaishali
- Region: India

History
- Built: c. 5th century BCE
- Abandoned: c. 600 CE

Site notes
- Condition: In ruins

Vaishali, Vesali or Vaiśālī was an ancient city and today an archaeological site located north of Patna in present-day Bihar, India. It is also a Jain and Buddhist pilgrimage site. As an archaeological site it is spread over a group of modern villages located within the Vaishali District in Tirhut Division.

It was the capital city of the Vajjika League considered one of the first examples of a republic that dates from c. 6th century BCE. Gautama Buddha preached his last sermon before his mahaparinirvana in c. 544 BCE, and Vaishali is also home to two important stupas directly related to the Buddha, the Relic Stupa of Vaishali, which is said to contain the ashes of the Buddha, The 24th and last Tirthankara of Jainism, Mahavira, was born in Kundagrama which has been identified as a suburb of the city of Vaishali and he was therefore referred to as Vesālie.

In 383 BCE the Second Buddhist council was convened here by King Kalashoka. It also contains one of the best-preserved of the Pillars of Ashoka from the 3rd century BCE, topped by a single Asiatic lion.

The city finds mention in the travel accounts of Chinese explorers, Faxian (4th century CE) and Xuanzang (7th century CE), which were later used in 1861 by British archaeologist Alexander Cunningham to first identify Vaiśālī with the present village of Basarh in the Vaishali District of Bihar. Since 2010, parts of the Vaishali archaeological site including the relic stupa and Asokan pillar have been considered a tentative site under the UNESCO World Heritage Sites list, in the category of the Silk Road sites in India.

== Etymology ==
Vaishali derives its name from King Vishal of the Mahabharata age.

== History ==
=== Monarchy period ===
References to what has been termed the "monarchy period" of Vaishali come from literary sources including the Puranas and give an indication of the early Indo-Aryan expansion eastwards in to the Gangetic plains. These sources detail that Vaivasvata Manu descendants settled and ruled in the region Vaishali starting with a King named Nābhānediṣṭha who is said to have founded the city. Traditional sources consider him to be a contemporary of Dasaratha, father of one of the greatest Kings during Treta Yuga Lord Rama, who is one avatars of Lord Vishnu. They belonged to the line of the Ikshvaku dynasty or the Sun Dynasty during ancient time in Bharat.

=== Republic period ===
The Vajji or Vrijji Mahajanapada, 600 BCE.

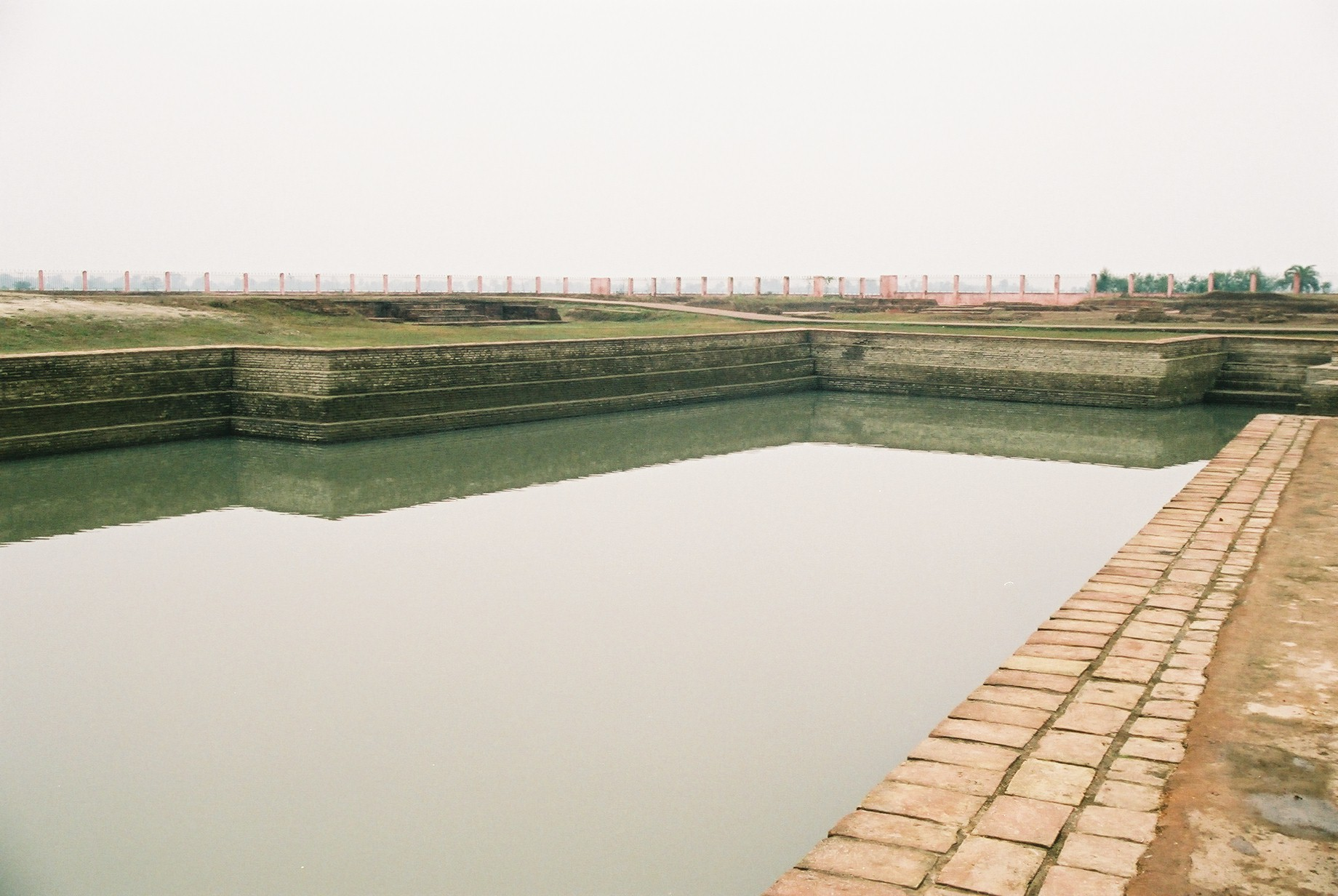
Abhishek Pushkarini, the coronation tank, near Buddha Relic Stupa, Vaishali

The Vajjika League was likely established at some point between the Kosalan conquest of Kasi and the Magadhan conquest of Anga which would place it around the 6th century BCE.

The Vajjika League was located on the territory of the former Mahā-Videha kingdom founded by the tribe of the Vaidehas, an Indo-Aryan tribe in the eastern Gangetic plain in the Greater Magadha cultural region. Around 800 BCE the Mahā-Videha ("greater Videha") kingdom was established between the Sadānirā river in the west, the Kauśikī river in the east, the Ganges river in the south, and the Himālaya mountains in the north.

Shortly before or during the lifetime of the Buddha, around the 7th or 6th century BCE, the Mahā-Videha kingdom was invaded by the Licchavikas, an Indo-Aryan tribe who temporarily occupied the Vaideha capital of Mithilā, from where they could best administer the territory of Videha. The consequence of the occupation of Videha by the republican Licchavikas was that the Licchavikas relatively peacefully overthrew the already weakened Vaideha monarchical system and replaced it by a republican system.

Facing the rising power of Magadha to the south of the Ganges, the Licchavikas established their republic in the southern part of the former Videha kingdom and moved their political centre to the until then marginal location of Vesālī, which the Licchavikas turned into their largest city as well as their capital and stronghold. Meanwhile, the new Videha republic existed in a limited territory centred around Mithilā and located to the north of Licchavi. Many members of the Vaideha aristocracy who had submitted to the Licchavikas joined them in moving to Vesālī, and therefore became members of the Licchavika ruling aristocratic Assembly.

Once settled around Vesālī, the Licchavikas formed a state organised as a gaṇasaṅgha (an aristocratic republic). The Licchavikas themselves henceforth became the leading power within the territory of the former Mahā-Videha kingdom, with the Licchavika Assembly holding the sovereign and supreme rights over this territory. The Licchavikas founded the Vajjika League as a temporary league led by themselves, and named after the Vajji tribe proper, who had been the most powerful tribe in the region of Vesālī and were one of the constituent tribes of the league, within which they held their own sovereign rights.

The Videha republic was ruled by an Assembly of the kṣatriyas residing in and around Mithilā, and governing in the name of the Licchavika Assembly: the Videha republic was thus under significant influence of the Licchavi republic, and it joined the Vajjika League, within which it had limited autonomy concerning their domestic administration under the supervision of Licchavi, who fully controlled Vaideha foreign policy. The Nāyikas, who were a sub-group of the Vaidehas who formed an independent tribe, were another constituent republic of the Licchavi-led Vajjika League, and hence they held autonomy in matters of internal policy while their war and foreign policies were handled by the Vajjika League. The Licchavikas and the Mallakas were considered to be the republican states of Kāsī-Kosala by Jain sources, and both Mallaka republics joined the Licchavi-led Vajjika League to deal with danger they might have faced in common during periods of instability, and within which they held friendly relations with the Licchavikas, the Vaidehas, and the Nāyikas who were the other members of this league, although occasional quarrels did break out between these republics. Unlike the other confederate tribes such as the Vaidehas and Nāyikas, who had no sovereign rights of their own because they were dependencies of Licchavi, the Mallakas maintained their own sovereign rights within the Vajjika League.

During the 6th century BCE, the Gaṇa Mukhya ("head of the republic") of the Licchavikas, that is the head of state of the Licchavikas and of their Council, was Ceṭaka or Ceḍaga, which also made him the head of the Council of the Vajjika League. Ceḍaga's sister Trisalā was married to the Nāyika Gaṇa Mukhya Siddhārtha, with this marriage having been contracted because of Siddhārtha's political importance due to the important geographical location close to Vesālī of the Nāya tribe he headed, as well as due to Siddhārtha's membership in the Vajjika Council. The son of Siddhārtha and Trisalā, that is Ceḍaga's nephew, was Mahāvīra, the 24th Jain Tīrthaṅkara. Ceṭaka became an adept of the teachings of his nephew Mahāvīra and adopted Jainism, thus making the Licchavika and Vajjika capital of Vesālī a bastion of Jainism, and his sixth daughter, Sujyeṣṭhā, became a Jain nun, while the diplomatic marriages of his other daughters to various leaders, in turn, contributed to the spreading of Jainism across northern South Asia: Prabhāvatī was married to the king Udāyana of Sindhu-Sauvīra; Padmāvatī was married to king Dadhivāhana of Aṅga; Mṛgāvatī was married to the king Śatānīka of Vatsa, with their son being the famous Udayana; Śivā was married to king Pradyota of Avanti; Jyeṣṭhā was married to Ceṭaka's nephew, Nandivardhana of Kuṇḍagāma, who was the son of Trisalā and the elder brother of Mahāvīra; Cellaṇā was married to the king Bimbisāra of Magadha.

After the death of the Buddha, the Licchavikas, the Mallakas, and the Sakyas claimed shares of his relics while the Vaidehas and the Nāyikas did not appear among the list of states claiming a share because they were dependencies of the Licchavikas without their own sovereignty, and therefore could not put forth their own claim while Licchavi could.

By the time Xuanzang visited Vaiśālī in the early 7th century, it was on the decline: he wrote of it that "the capital is ruined" and "it may be called a village or town" (as opposed to a city).

=== Visits of the Buddha to Vaiśālī ===
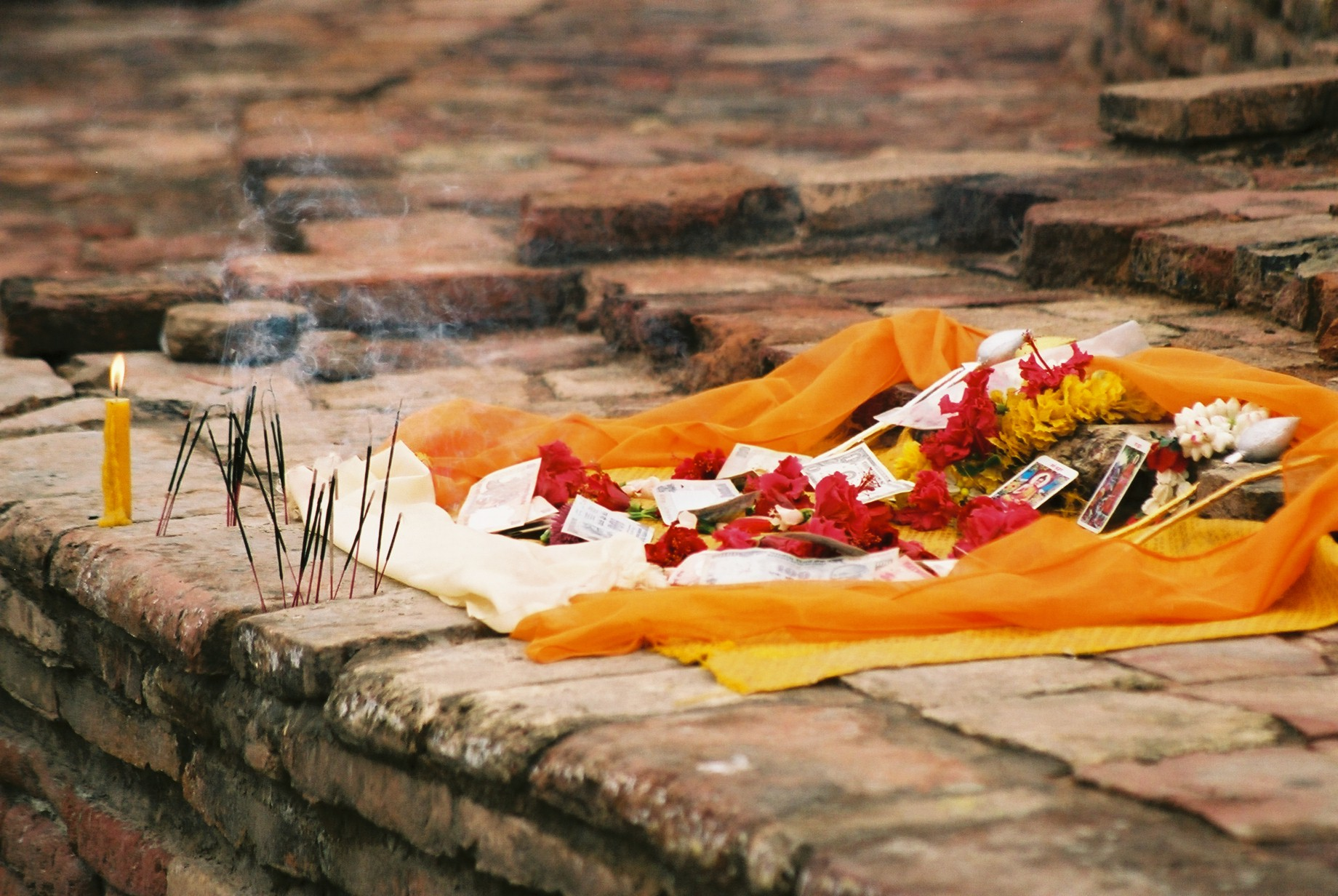
A Buddhist shrine amidst the Vihara, Vaiśālī

Vaishali is well known for its close association with the Buddha. After leaving Kapilavastu for renunciation, Prince Siddhartha came to Vaishali first and undertook his initial spiritual training from Uddaka Rāmaputta (Rāmaputra Udraka) and Āḷāra Kālāma. After the Enlightenment the Buddha frequently visited Vaishali. He organized the sangha on the pattern of Vaishalian democracy. It was here that he first allowed females to join the sangha, initiating his maternal aunt Mahaprajapati Gautami into the order. His last Varshavasa (rainy season resort) was here and he announced his approaching Mahaparinirvana (the final departure from the world) just three months in advance. Before leaving for Kusinagara, where he died, he left his alms-bowl (Bhiksha-Patra) here with the people of Vaishali.

=== Jainism at Vaishali ===
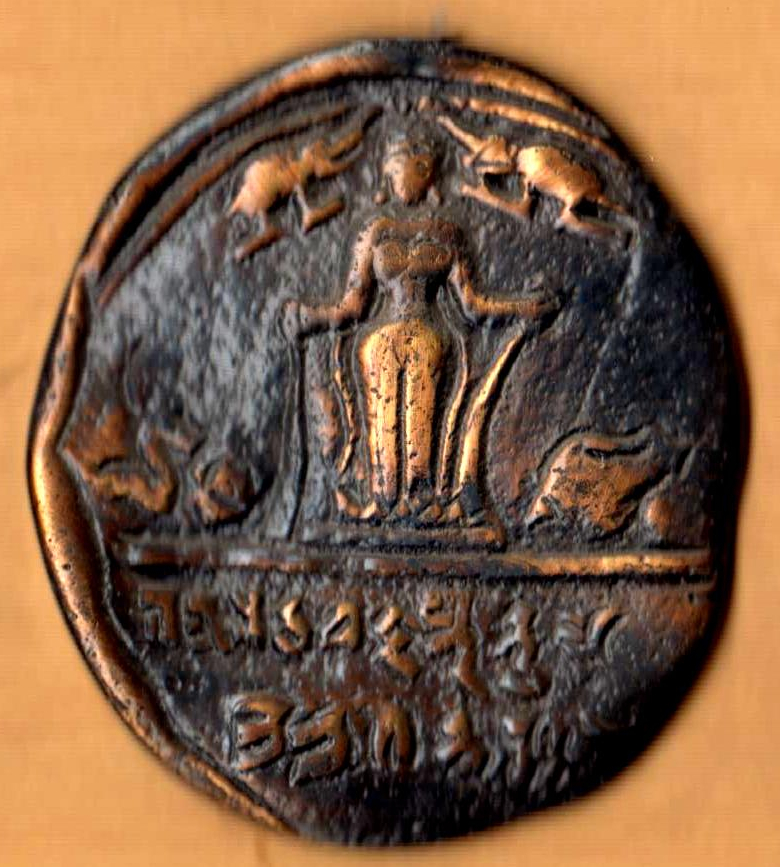
Prince Vardhaman (Lord Mahavira) used this seal after the Judgement

The Śvetāmbaras state that the final Tirthankara, Lord Mahavira, was born and raised in Kshatriyakund district, Vaiśālī to King Siddhartha and Queen Trishala. According to the Jain text Uttarapurāṇa, King Chetaka ruled as a Republican President in Vaishali and was a famed ruler. He is also mentioned as a staunch follower of Jainism. According to the text, Chetaka had ten sons and seven daughters. His sister Priyakarini (also known as Trishala) was married to Siddhartha of the Nāya clan. His daughter Chellana married Shrenik (also known as Bimbisara). As per Indologist Hermann Jacobi, Vardhaman Mahavira's mother Trishala was the sister of King Chetaka.

== Archaeological sites ==
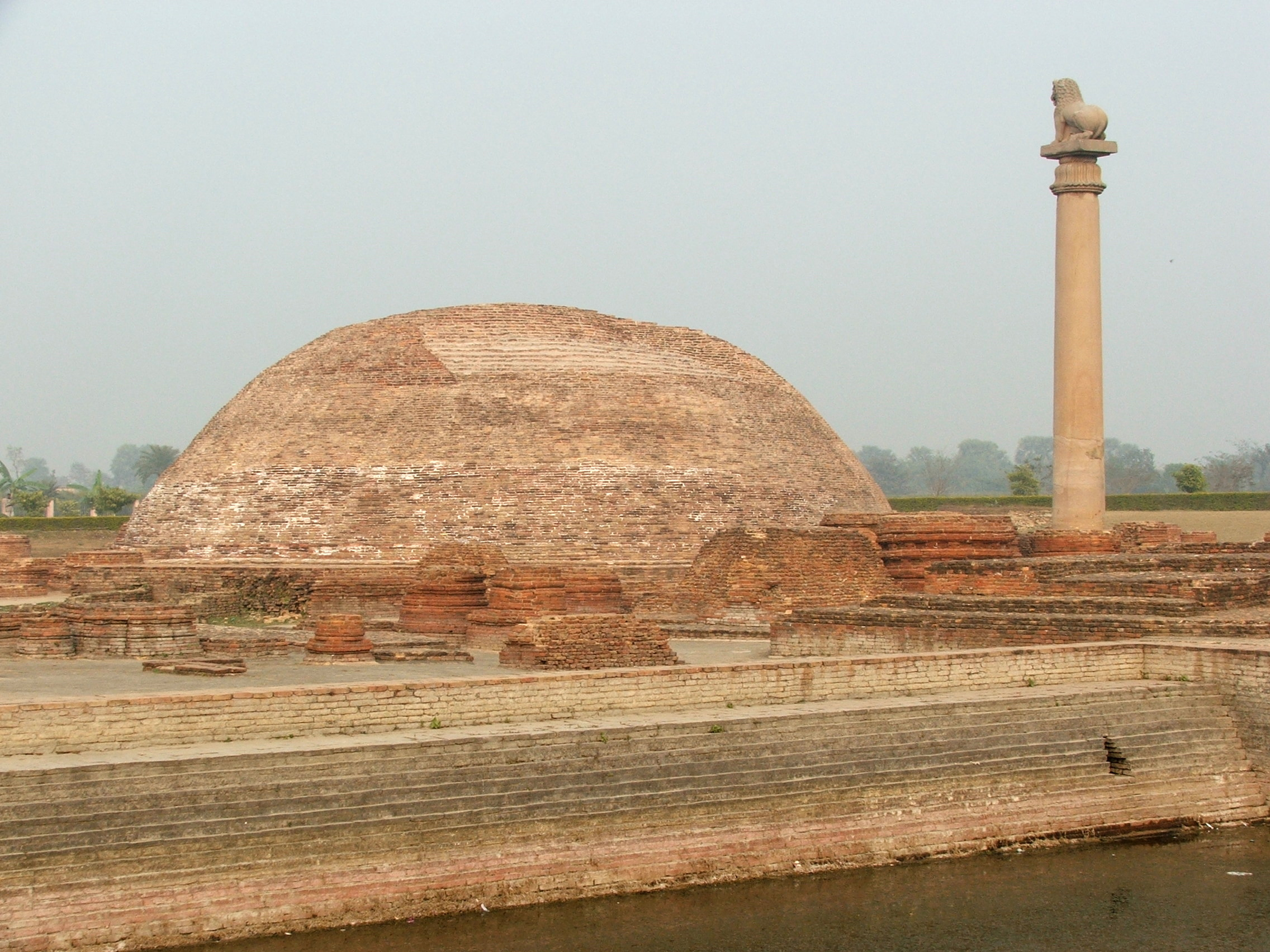
Ānanda Stupa, with an Asokan pillar at Kolhua, Vaiśālī

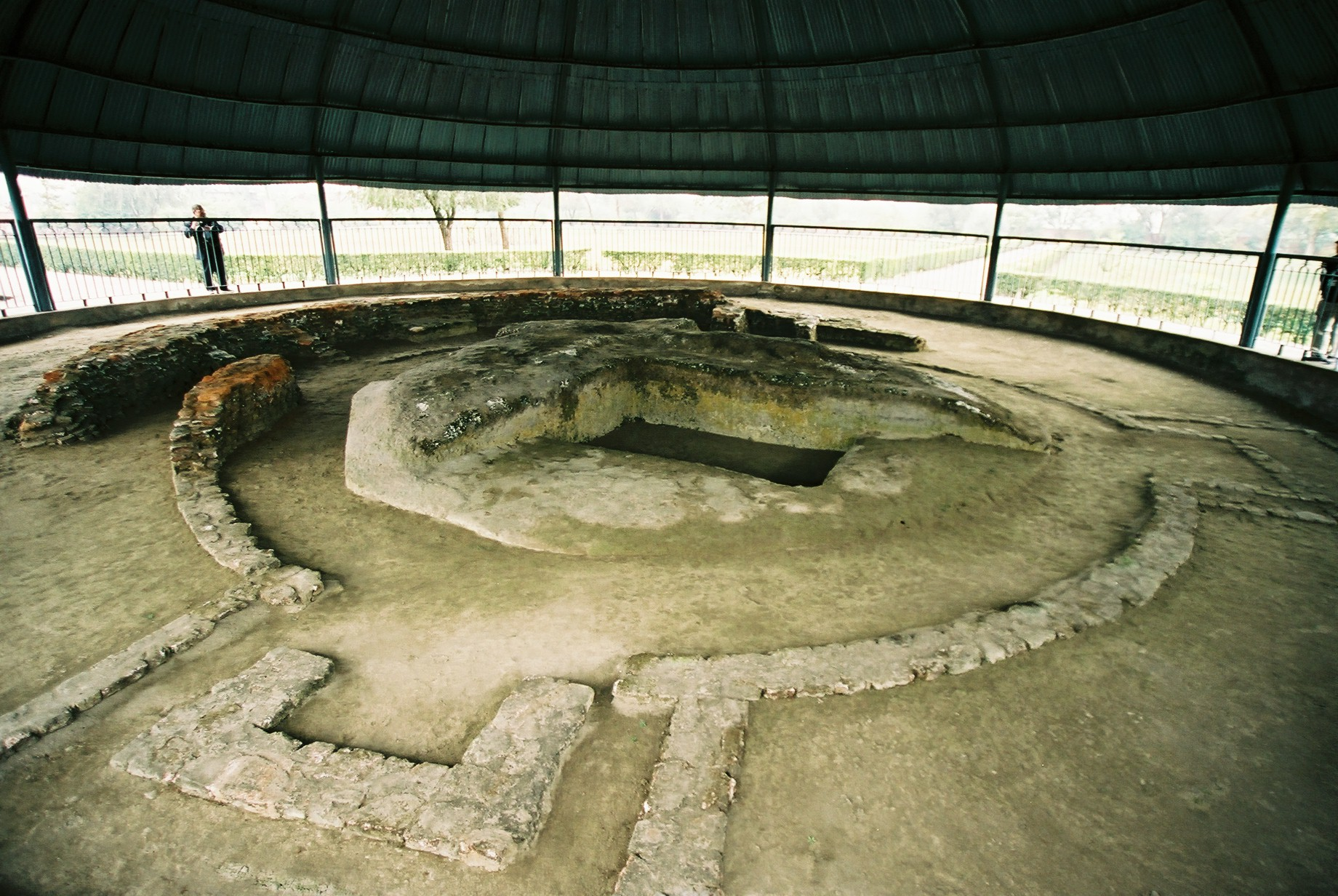
Buddha's ashes Stupa built by the Licchavis, Vaiśālī

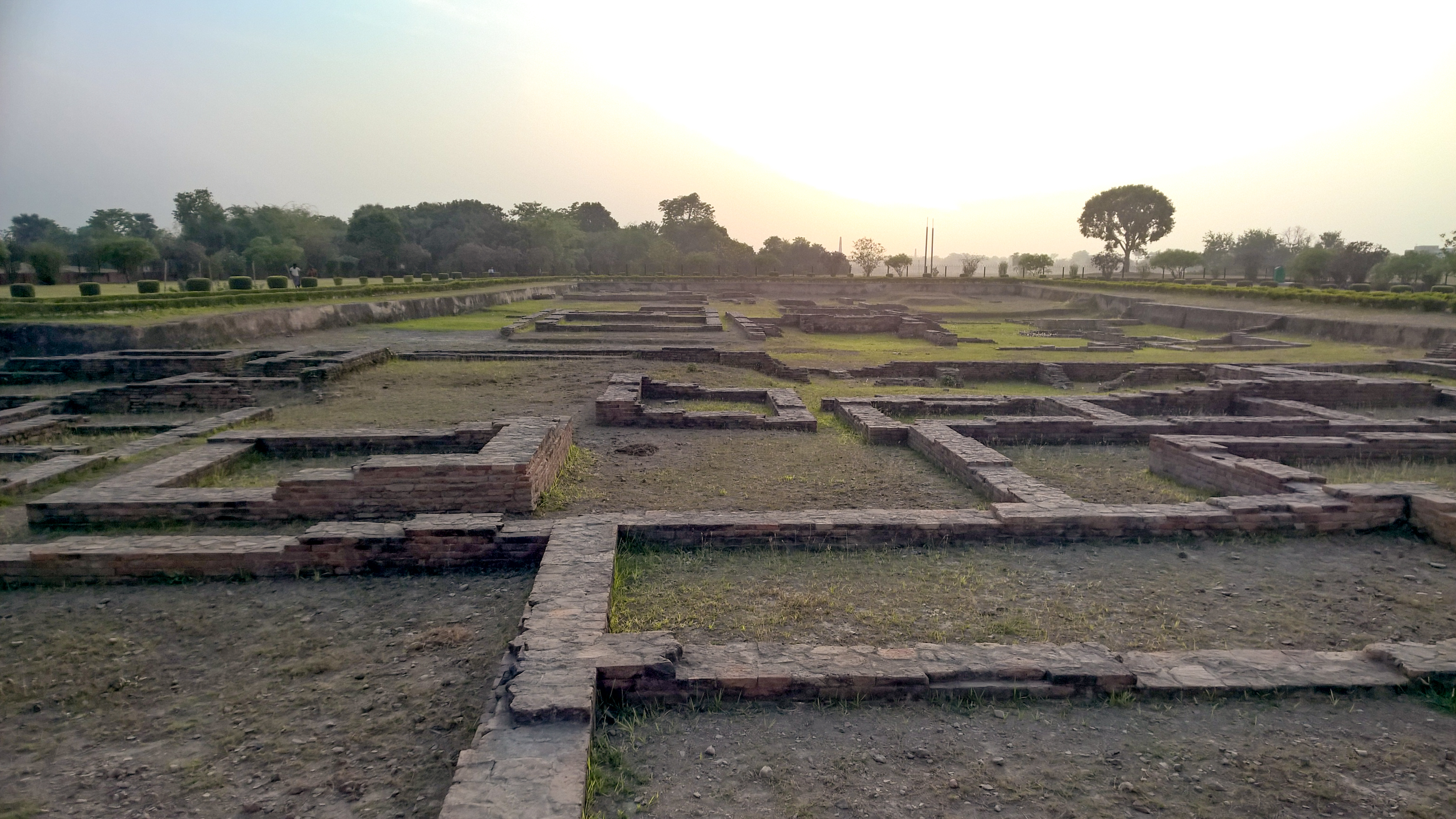
Ruins known locally as "Raja Vishal ke Garh"

=== Relic stupa ===
The relic stupa is one of the archaeological finds in Vaishali. Here the Licchavis reverentially encased one of the eight portions of the Buddha's relics, which they received after the Mahaparinirvana. After his last discourse the Buddha set out for Kushinagar, but the Licchavis kept following him. The Buddha gave them his alms bowl but they still refused to return. He then created an illusion of a river in spate which compelled them to go back. This site can be identified with Deora in modern Kesariya village, where Ashoka later built a stupa.

As per recent research, the relic stupa is potentially one of the earliest archaeologically known stupas.

=== Fort of Raja Vishal ===
A group of ruins near the modern villages of Basarh have been termed by locals as "Raja Vishal ke Garh". Earlier excavations have found objects datedable to the Northern Black Polished Ware period from 500 BCE to 200 BCE and it is believed to be the remains of a citadel of palace during the Vajjika League period. The citadel and likely Vaishali itself was deserted by the period of the Later Gupta dynasty around 600 CE. The historian, Nayanjot Lahiri dates the remains to the sixth century BCE.

=== Kolhua ===
Excavations by the Archaeological Survey of India at Vaishali revealed the remains of Kutagarshala, a swastika-shaped monastery, a tank, votive stupas, miniature shrines, a main stupa, and an Ashokan pillar, spanning from the Mauryan (3rd century B.C.) to post-Gupta (7th century A.D.) periods. The 11-meter polished sandstone pillar known locally as "Lat," topped with a lion capital, is likely one of Ashoka's earliest pillars and features Gupta-era inscriptions but no edicts. A brick stupa commemorating the monkey chief's offering of honey to Buddha was initially built during the Mauryan era, expanded with a circumambulatory path in the Kushan period, and further modified during Gupta times.

Nearby is the brick-lined, seven-tiered tank called ‘Markat-Hrad,’ believed to have been dug by monkeys for Buddha, measuring approximately 65 by 35 meters with bathing ghats. Kutagarshala, Buddha's seasonal residence, underwent three construction phases—from a small Chaitya (Sunga-Kushana) to a grand temple (Gupta) and finally a monastery with partition walls (post-Gupta).

The Gupta-period swastika-shaped monastery, possibly for nuns, contains twelve rooms around a central courtyard, an eastern entrance, and a toilet. Artifacts such as semi-precious beads, terracotta figures, seals, inscribed pottery, and a unique terracotta crowned monkey found here are exhibited at the local ASI museum.

== World Peace Pagoda ==
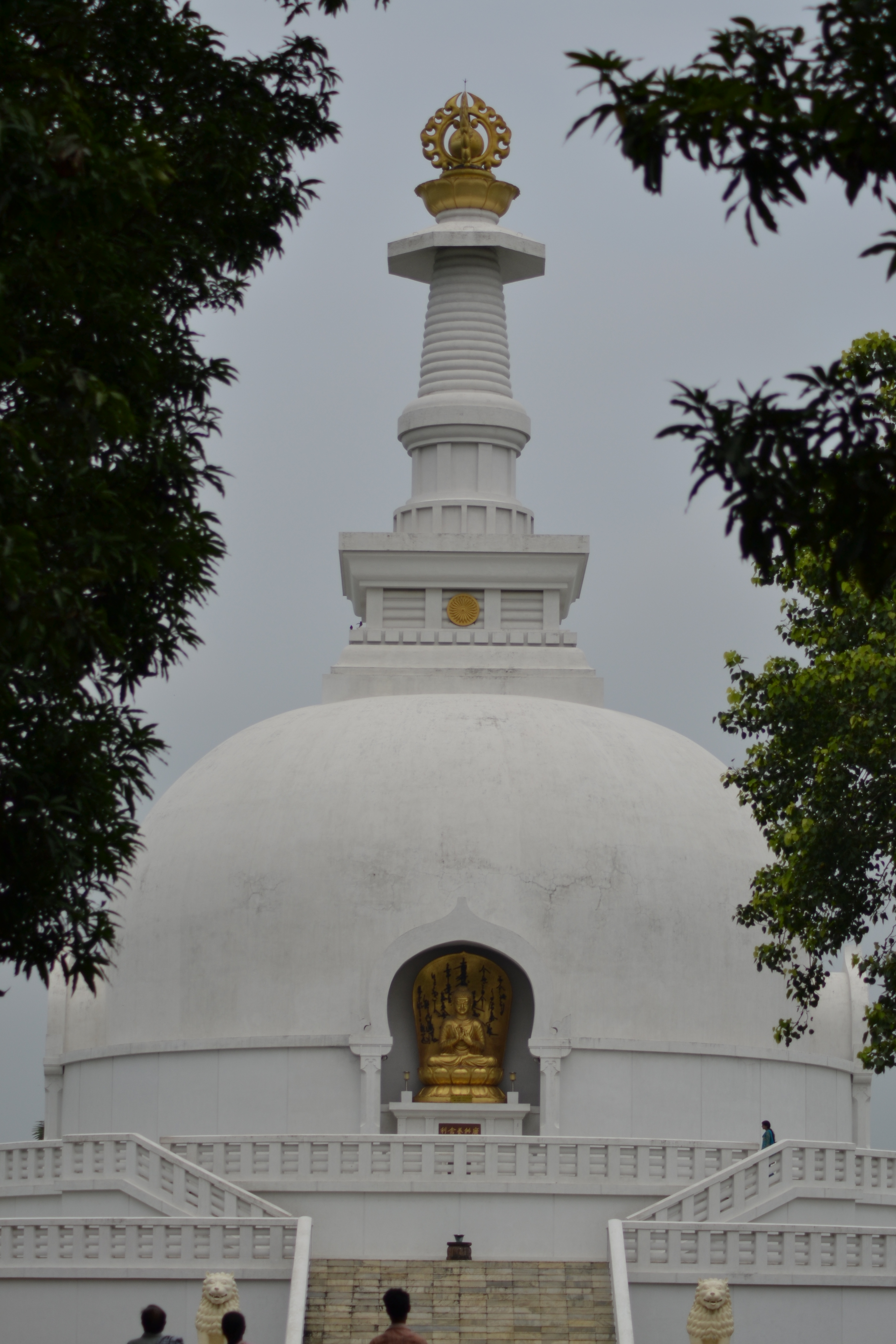
Visva Santi Stupa

Next to the coronation tank stands the Japanese temple and the Viśvā Śānti Stūpa (World Peace Pagoda) built by the Japanese Nichiren Buddhist sect Nipponzan-Myōhōji. A small part of the Buddha's relics found in Vaiśālī have been enshrined in the foundation and in the chhatra of the Stupa.

The Vaishali Museum was established in 1971 by the Archaeological Survey of India to preserve and display the antiquities found during the exploration of sites around ancient Vaishali.

== Recent development ==
- In February 2019, Chief Minister of Bihar Nitish Kumar laid the foundation stone of Buddha Samyak Darshan Museum and Memorial Stupa to house Buddha relics.
- In September 2020, Prime Minister of India Narendra Modi inaugurated the Vaishali Railway station. This rail line now connects the city with Hajipur and Patna.

== Historical figures from Vaishali ==
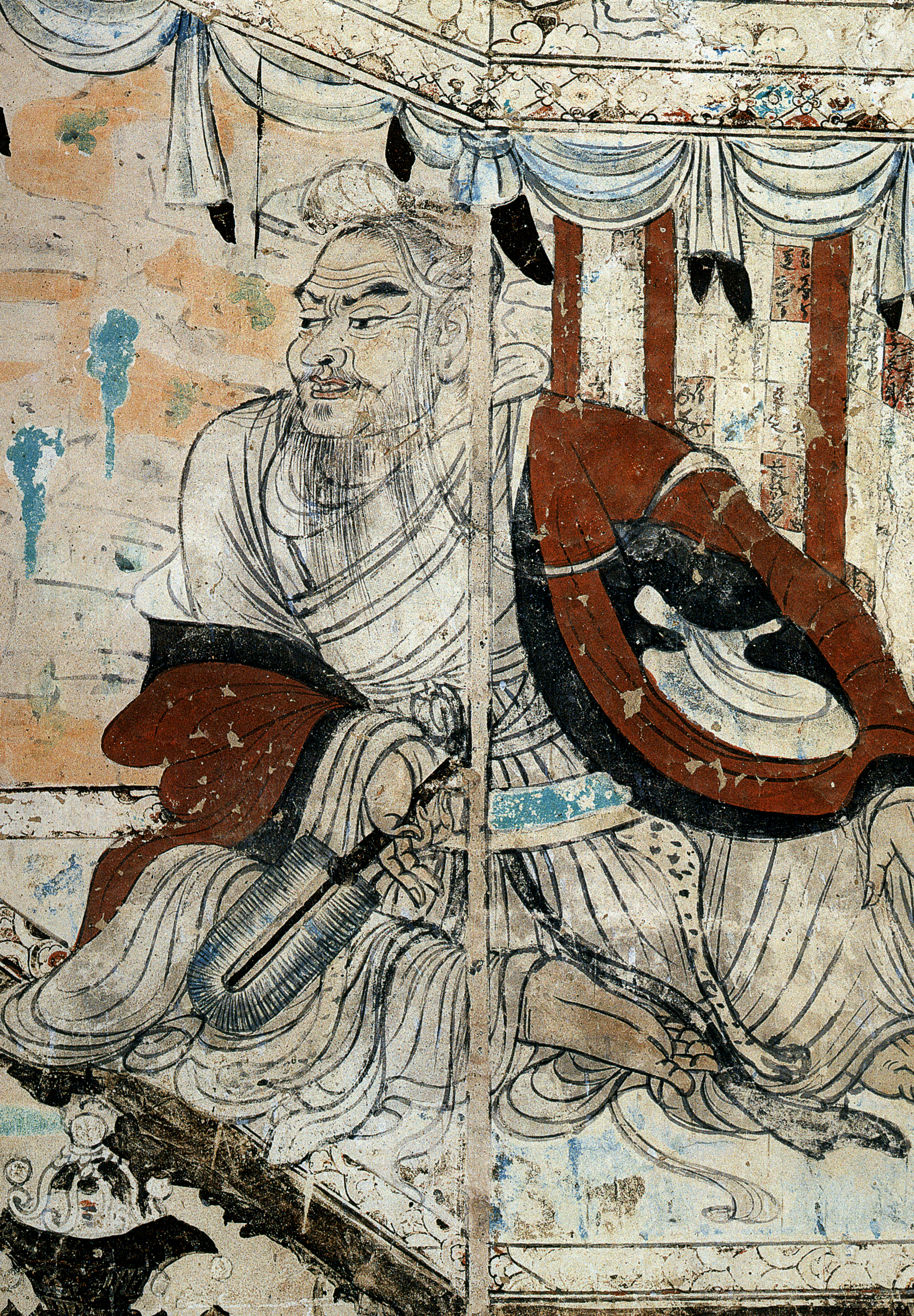
Vimalakirti, 8th century wall painting, Dunhuang

- Mahavira, the 24th Tirthankara of Jainism. Born into a royal kshatriya family in what is now Vaishali district of Bihar. He abandoned all worldly possessions at the age of 30 and became an ascetic. He is considered a slightly older contemporary of the Buddha.
- Chetaka, King and ruler of the Vajjika League which had its capital in Vaishali.
- Vimalakirti, the central figure of the Vimalakirti Sutra and a lay practitioner of Buddhism.
- Gayadhara, 11th century Buddhist master and scholar

== See also ==
- Mithila (region)
- Pillars of Ashoka
- Chaumukhi Mahadev Mandir

== Bibliography ==
- Kumar, Dilip (1986). Archaeology of Vaishali. Ramanand Vidya Bhawan.
- Singer, Noel.F. (2008). Vaishali and the Indianization of Arakan. APH Publishing. ISBN 978-81-313-0405-1.
- Mishra, Yogendra (1962). An Early History of Vaiśālī: From the Earliest Times to the Fall of the Vajjian Republic, Circa 484 B.C. Motilal Banarsidass.
- Prasad Sinha, Bindeshwari (1961). Vaiśālī Excavations, 1958-1962. Directorate of Archaeology and Museums.
- Nath Prasad, Birendra (2021). "Urbanization in Early Historic Vaiśālī, c. 600 BCE-400 CE". Rethinking Bihar and Bengal: History, Culture and Religion. Routledge. ISBN 9781000465099.
- Deo, Shantaram Bhalchandra (1956). History of Jaina Monachism from Inscriptions and Literature. Pune, India: Deccan College Post-Graduate and Research Institute. ISBN 978-9-333-68377-7.
- Jain, Kailash Chand (1974). Lord Mahāvīra and His Times. Delhi, India: Motilal Banarsidass. p. 66. ISBN 978-8-120-80805-8.
- Sharma, J. P. (1968). Republics in Ancient India, C. 1500 B.C.-500 B.C. Leiden, Netherlands: E. J. Brill. ISBN 978-9-004-02015-3.
- Sikdar, Jogendra Chandra (1964). Studies in the Bhagawatīsūtra. Muzaffarpur, Bihar, India: Research Institute of Prakrit, Jainology & Ahimsa. pp. 388–464.
- Pannalal Jain (2015), Uttarapurāṇa of Āchārya Guṇabhadra, Bhartiya Jnanpith, ISBN 978-81-263-1738-7
- Sunavala, A.J. (1934), Adarsha Sadhu: An Ideal Monk. (First paperback edition, 2014 ed.), Cambridge University Press, ISBN 9781107623866
