= Relics associated with Buddha =

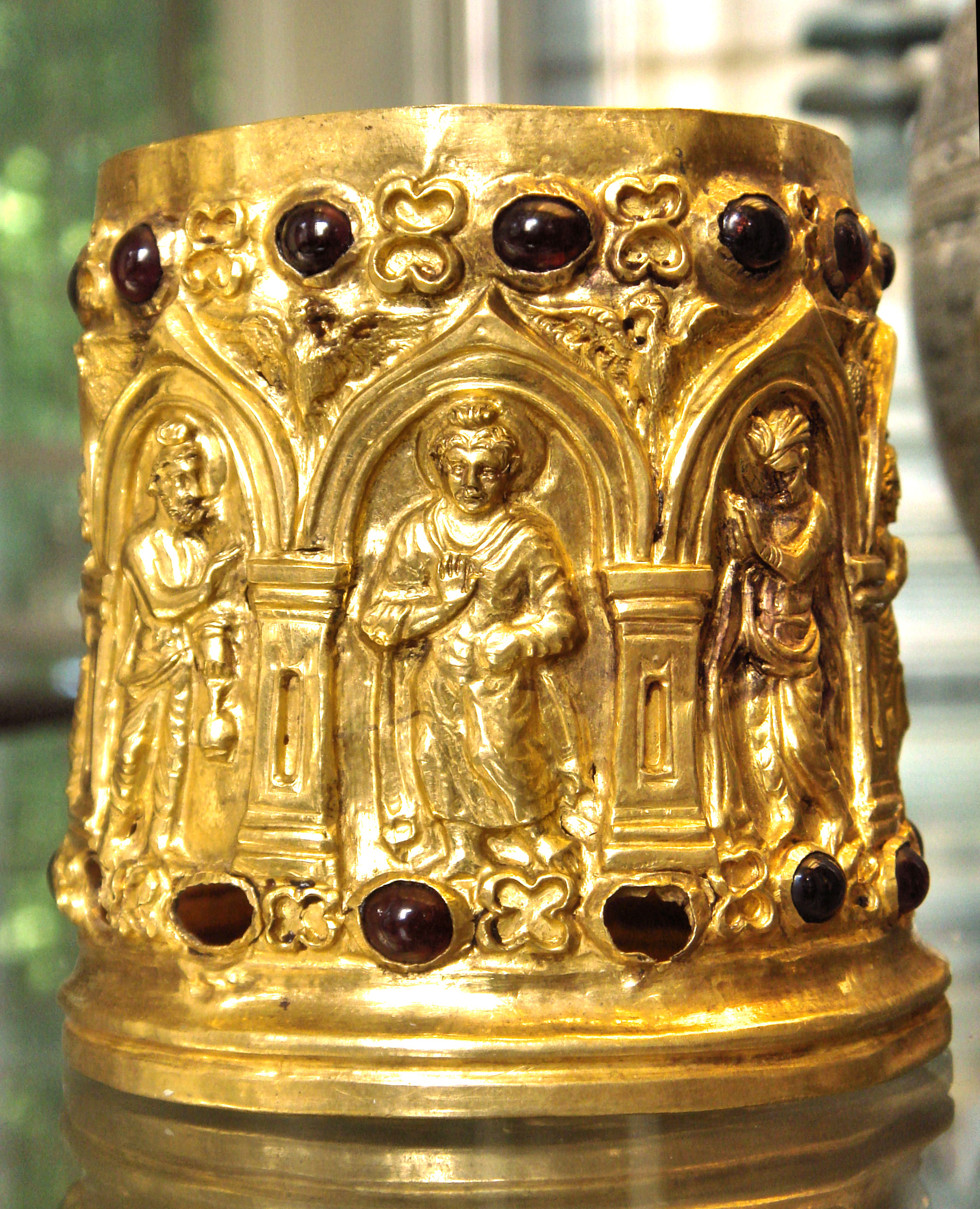
The Bimaran Casket is a 1st-century gold reliquary for relics of Buddha, found inside stupa no.2 at Bimaran, near Jalalabad in eastern Afghanistan

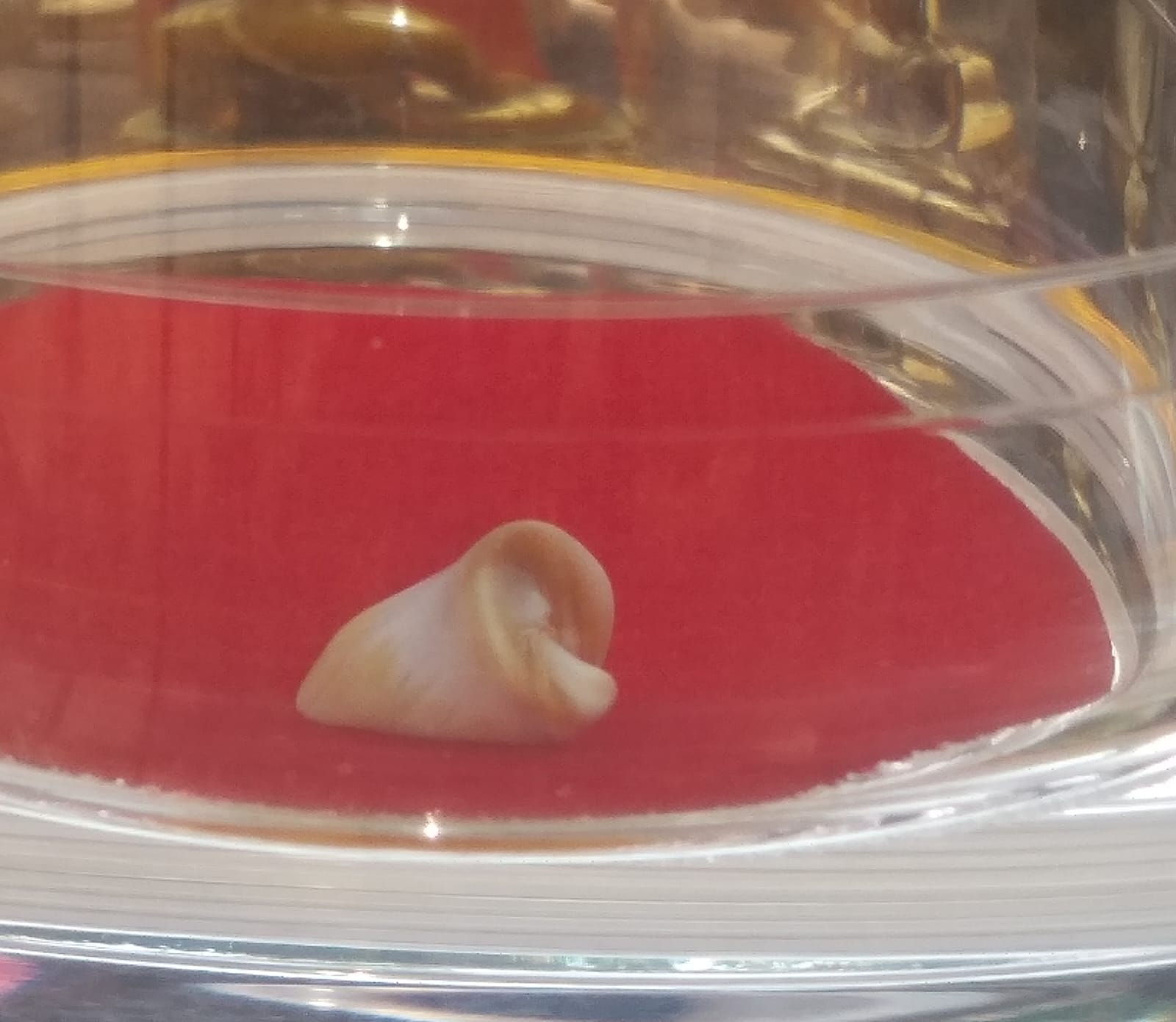
Sacred tooth relics of the Buddha, venerated at a Buddhist site in Bandarban, Bangladesh

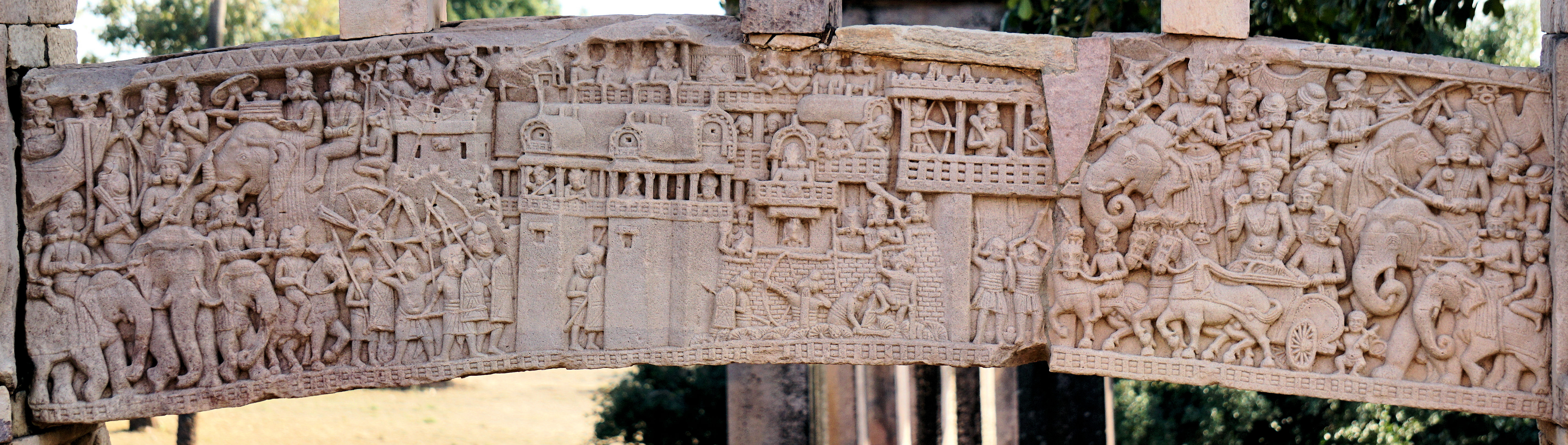
War over the Buddha's Relics at Sanchi (1st century BCE/CE). The Buddha died in Kusinagara, the capital of the Mallakas, who initially tried to keep all the relics of the Buddha for themselves. A war erupted in which the chiefs of seven other clans waged war against the Mallakas of Kushinara for the possession of the Buddha's relics. In the center of the architrave, the siege of Kushinara is in progress; to right and left, the victorious chiefs are departing in chariots and on elephants, with the relics borne on the heads of the latter.

According to sources in the Sutta Piṭaka of the Pāli Canon, like the Mahāparinibbāṇa Sutta (Sutta 16 of the Dīgha Nikāya), after the parinirvana (the Buddha's final nirvana during his physical death), the physical body of Gautama Buddha was cremated and the bodily relics which remained afterwards, called Śarīra, were divided among his lay followers, who took them to different regions of India and built stupas for them.

== Division of the relics ==
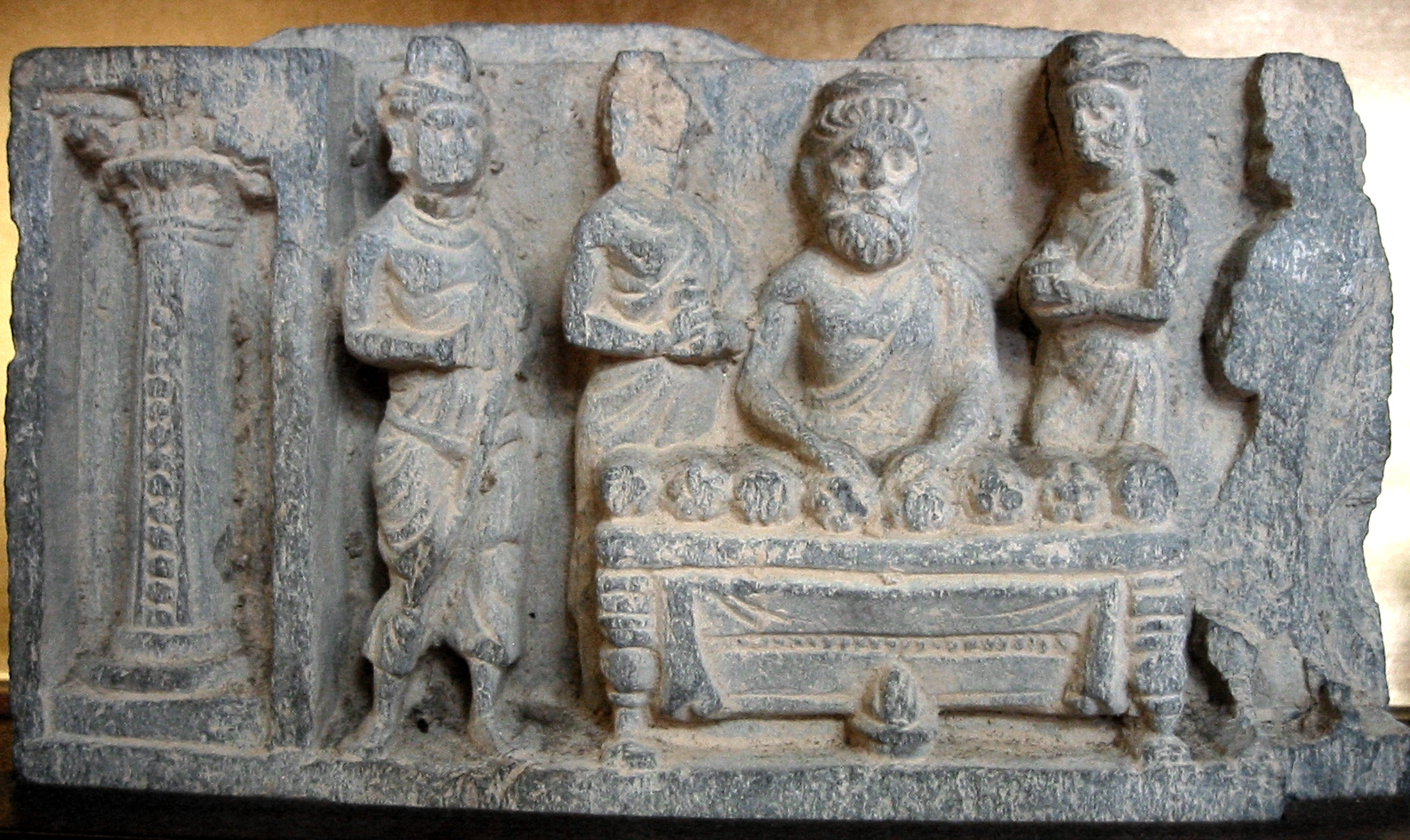
The division of the relics of the Buddha by Drona the Brahmin. Greco-Buddhist art of Gandhara, 2-3rd century CE. Zenyōmitsu-ji, Tokyo.

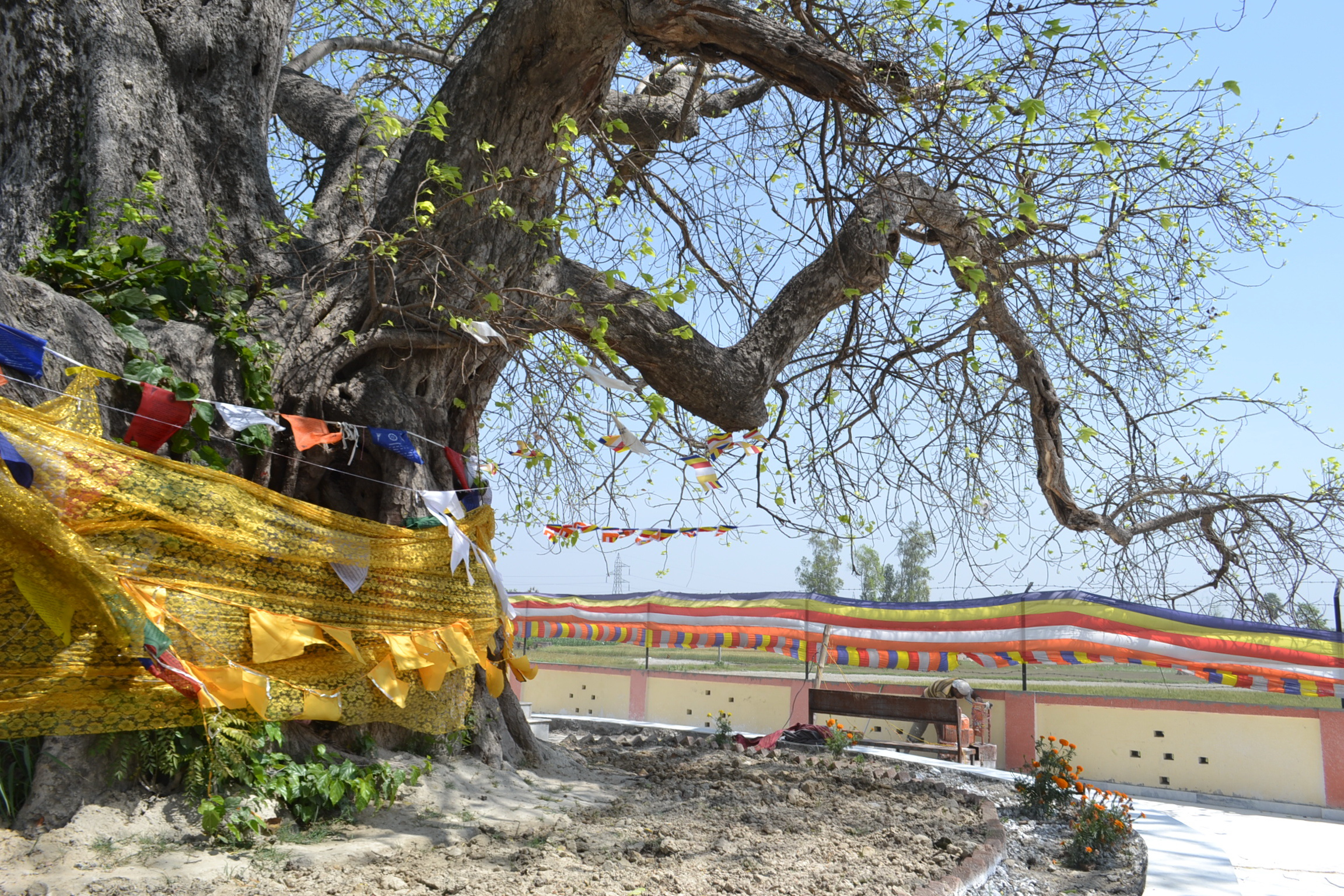
Site of the distribution of the relics of the Buddha, Kushinagar

According to the Mahāparinibbāṇa Sutta, after his parinirvana in Kushinagar, the remains of the Buddha were cremated at that location. Originally his ashes were to go only to the Sakya clan, to which the Buddha belonged. However, six other clans and a king demanded the ashes of the Buddha. In order to resolve this dispute, a Brahmin named Drona divided the ashes of the Buddha into eight portions. These portions were distributed as follows: to Ajātasattu, king of Magadha; to the Licchavis of Vesāli; to the Sakyas of Kapilavastu; to the Bulis of Allakappa; to the Koliyas of Rāmagāma; to the Vethadipaka-Dronagramakas; to the Mallas of Pāvā; and to the Mallas of Kusinārā. In addition to these eight portions, two other important relics were distributed at that time: Drona (the Brahmin who distributed the relics) received the vessel in which the body had been cremated, and the Moriyas of Pipphalivana received the remaining ashes of the funeral pyre.

According to Buddhaghosa and Mahavamsa, Each of these ten portions was placed in a reliquary (such as the Kanishka casket or the Bimaran casket) and buried in a tumulus. These tumuli have been expanded or reconstructed over many centuries to form large stupas. King Ajasat of Magadha, according to the instructions of Maha Kassapa, took relics from Stupas of different countries and made a great treasure of relics as an underground stupa for the protection of the relics. Of these, the only one which remains intact is the Ramagrama stupa in Ramgram, Nepal. Because at that time, King Ajasat did not take the relic parts from the stupa of Ramagrama because they were to be given to Ruwanwelisaya Maha Stupa in Sri Lanka in the future by the order of Maha Kassapa Thero. There is significant evidence to support the authenticity of the stupa at Piprahwa, as well as the Relic Stupa of Vaishali and the Ramabhar Stupa at Kushinagar. Apart from these, archaeological investigations to date have not definitively identified any of the remaining stupas.

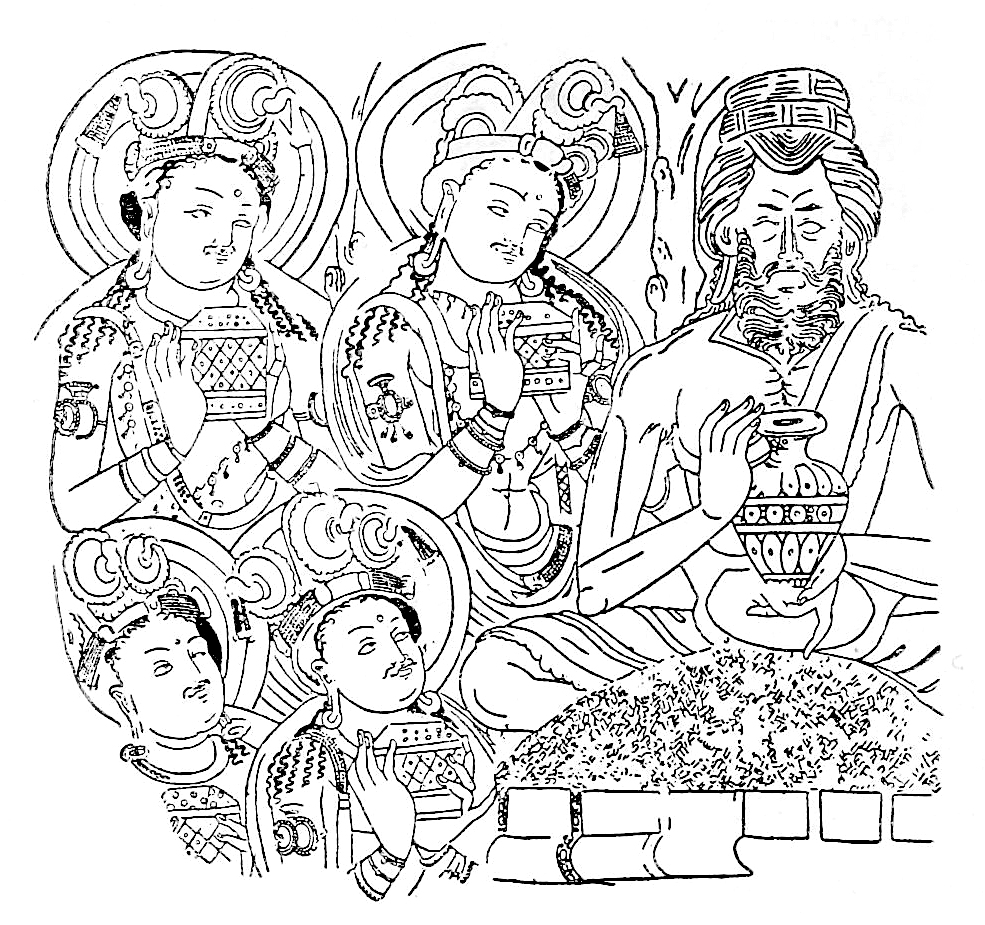
The sharing of the relics of the Buddha by the Brâhmana Drona, to eight kings (four are visible). Relief from the Cave of the Painters, Kizil Caves, circa 500 CE

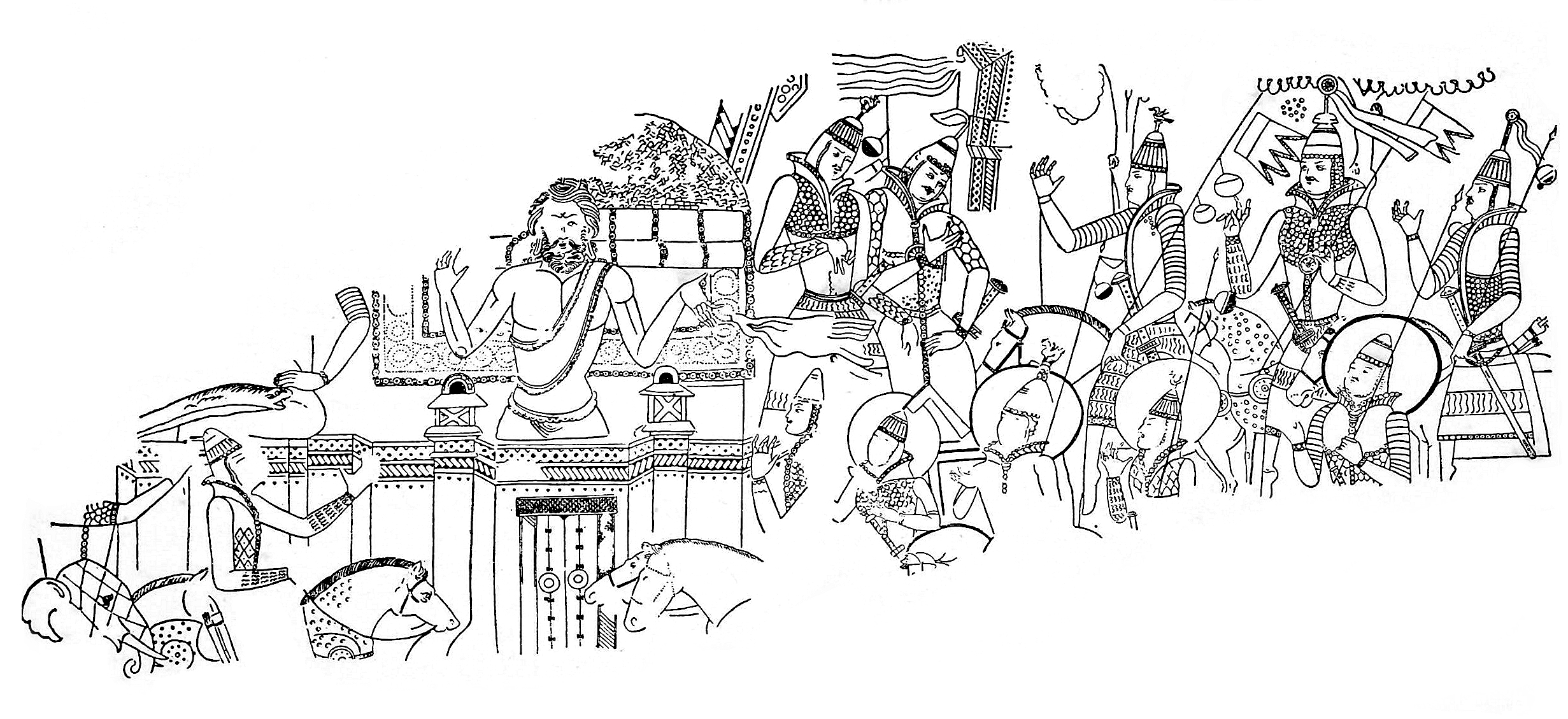
War for the relics: mural with warriors and the Brahmin Drona, Cave of the Painters, Kizil Caves, circa 500 CE

== Spread of the relics by Ashoka ==
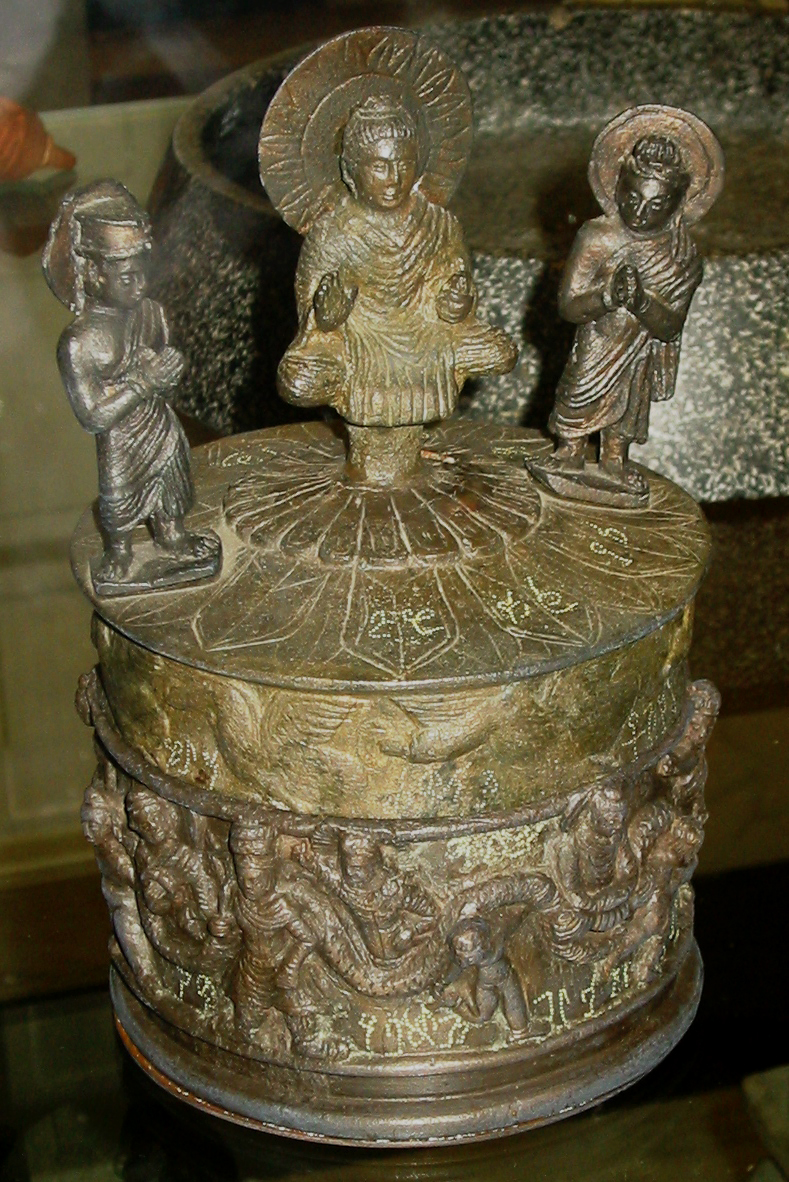
The Kanishka Casket, dated to 127 CE, with the Buddha

The Lokapannatti, a collection of stories written in the 11th or 12th century, tells the story of Ajātasattu of Magadha (c. 492 – c. 460 BCE) who gathered the Buddha's relics and hid them in an underground stupa. According to this text, the Buddha's relics were protected by spirit-powered mechanical robots until they were disarmed two centuries later by Emperor Ashoka (c. 304 – 232 BCE). (Note: King Ajātasattu's Magadha kingdom was the predecessor of the Maurya Empire of King Ashoka.) According to Mahāvaṃsa and Ashokavadana, Ashoka collected seven of the eight relics of Gautama Buddha, and redistributed them across 84,000 stupas that he ordered to be constructed around the world.

When the Chinese pilgrims Faxian (337 CE – c. 422 CE) and Xuanzang (602–664 CE) visited India centuries later, they reported that most of the ancient sites were in ruin.

The Mahaparinirvana sutra says that of the Buddha's four eye teeth (canines), one was worshipped in Silumini Maha Stupa in Skra's Heaven, the second in the city of Ghandara (current location not specifically identified), the third in Kalinga (current location: Temple of the Tooth in Kandy), and the fourth one in Kingdom of Naga King Jayasena in the Naga World (current location: Wilgamwehera Somawathiya Maha Stupa in Seuwila, Sri Lanka). Their current locations are discussed below. In the past relics have had the legal right to own property, and the destruction of stupas containing relics was a capital crime viewed as murder of a living person. A southeast Asian tradition says that, after his parinirvana, the gods distributed the Buddha's 800,000 body and 900,000 head hairs throughout the universe. In Theravāda, according to the 5th century commentator Buddhaghosa, possessing relics was one of the criteria for what constituted a proper monastery. The adventures of many relics are said to have been foretold by Buddha, as they spread the dharma and gave legitimacy to rulers.

In Buddhist eschatology, it is said that all of Buddha's relics will one day gather at the Bodhi tree, where he attained enlightenment, and will then form his body, sitting cross legged and performing the twin miracle; the disappearance of the relics at this point will signal the coming of Maitreya Buddha. In the Nandimitravadana translated by Xuanzang it is said that the Buddha's relics will be brought to parinirvana by sixteen great arhats and enshrined in a great stupa. That stupa will then be worshipped until it sinks into the earth down to the golden wheel underlying the universe. The relics are not destroyed by fire in this version but placed in a final reliquary deep within the earth, perhaps to appear again.

Previous Buddhas also left relics; in the Buddhavamsa it mentions that the Sobhita, Paduma, Sumedha, Atthadassi, Phussa, Vessabhu, and Konagamana, these Buddhas have had their relics dispersed.

The relics of Buddha's noble disciples like Sariputta and Maudgalyāyana, were also preserved enshrined in stupas (as in Sanchi).

== Relics in Afghanistan ==
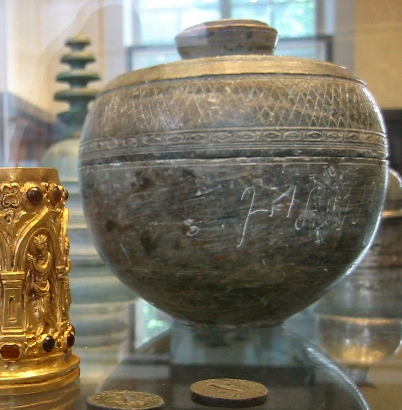
The steatite box that contained the Bimaran casket.

Sometime in the middle of the fifth century, the Chinese pilgrim Daorong traveled to Afghanistan to visit pilgrimage sites. In Nagarahara was a piece of bone from the top of Buddha's skull four inches long. Also in the city was an enshrined staff, and a jeweled reliquary containing some teeth and hair. A shadow was said to have been projected onto a rock wall, said to have belonged to Buddha, as well as a set of footprints, and a site venerated for being where Buddha washed his robe. A temple said to have been built by Buddha is sinking into the ground here, with what is said to be his writing on the wall. A tooth of the Buddha was kept in Baktra. In Bamyan a tooth of Buddha was stored along with the tooth of a cakravartin king. An early masterpiece of the Greco-Buddhist art of Gandhara, and one of the earliest representations of the Buddha, the Bimaran casket was discovered in a stupa near Jalalabad in eastern Afghanistan. Although the casket bears an inscription saying it contained some of the relics of the Buddha; no relics were discovered when the box was opened.

Buddha's first disciples Trapusa and Bahalika received eight strands of hair from him which they brought to their hometown of Balkh and enshrined in a golden stupa by the gate.

== Relics in Bangladesh ==
A Buddha relic is kept in Buddha Dhatu Jadi Bangladesh beneath four Buddha statues. The Buddha's Dhatu was given to Ven. U Paññya Jota Mahathero in 1994 by the State Sangha Maha Nayaka Committee of Myanmar.

== Relics in Bhutan ==
Ringsels from Buddha, Nagarjuna, Longchenpa, Marpa, and Milarepa visited Chubachu Bhutan from Bodhgaya Sri Lanka, in October 2013.

== Relics in Cambodia ==
A Buddha relic was enshrined at Sakyamuni Chedai in Oudong in 2002. Fifty years earlier, this relic was transported from Sri Lanka to Phnom Penh, but was transported again after King Sihanouk voiced concerns about urban decay surrounding Phnom Penh. King Sihanouk of Cambodia received a Buddha relic from the French in 1952. Relics present from the 1950s were recently stolen in Oudong mountain and remain missing.

A golden urn said to contain relics of Buddha was snatched from a mountain shrine, sparking a nationwide manhunt, and was recovered on 5 February 2014. The disappearance of the urn - believed to contain hair, teeth, and bones of Buddha and several small statues - came to light in December and prompted an outcry in the Buddhist-majority country. "Everything is still in the urn," national police spokesman Kirt Chantharith told a news agency.

== Relics in China ==
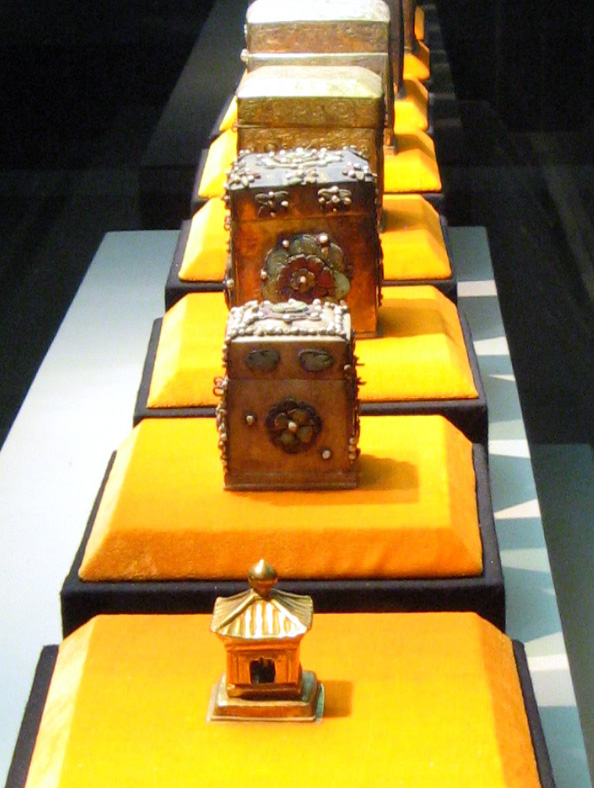
Eight nested reliquary boxes supposed to contain a finger bone of the Buddha. The innermost container, the miniature temple, is made of solid gold. From the Famen Temple.

According to legend, the first Buddha relic in China appeared in a vase in 248 C.E. brought by Kang Senghui to show a local ruler. The king of Wu Sun Quan would unsuccessfully attempt to destroy the tooth, by subjecting it to various tests. In legends Daoxuan is attributed with the transmission of the Buddha relic Daoxuan's tooth, one of the four tooth relics enshrined in the capital Chang'an during the Tang dynasty. He is said to have received the relic during a night visit from a divinity associated with Indra. The emperor Taizong tried to burn a tooth relic but was unable to do so.

According to his biography upon his return in 645 C.E. Xuanzang returned from his seventeen-year-long pilgrimage to India with, "over six hundred Mahayana and Hinayana texts, seven statues of the Buddha and more than a hundred sarira relics."

Emperor Wen and Empress Wu of the Sui dynasty both venerated Buddha relics. Daoxuan's Ji gujin fodao lunheng (Collection of [the Documents Related to] the Buddho-Taoist Controversies in the Past and the Present; completed 661) recounts that shortly after being born, Emperor Wen was given to a Buddhist "divine nun" until the age of 13. After becoming emperor, Emperor Wen led three Buddha relic redistribution campaigns in 601, 602, and 604. The relics were enshrined across 107 pagodas along with pictures of the divine nun.

In 2010 remains of Gautama Buddha's skull were enshrined at Qixia Temple in Nanjing. The partial bone had been held in the Pagoda of King Ashoka, constructed in 1011 under the former Changgan Temple of Nanjing. In 1987 a chamber was unearthed below Famen temple and a finger bone said to belong to Gautama Buddha was discovered. In 2003 the finger bone was one of 64 culturally significant artifacts officially prohibited from leaving China for exhibitions. In 2009, the relic was enshrined in the world's tallest stupa recently built within the domains of Famen Temple.

Two bone fragments believed to belong to Gautama Buddha are enshrined at Yunju temple. According to Tang dynasty records, China had 19 pagodas of King Ashoka holding Sakyamuni's relics. Seven of these pagodas are believed to have been found. Currently the tooth relic is kept in Beijing while the knuckle of the middle finger is at Xi'an city Shaanxi province.

In 1072 the Japanese pilgrim Jojin visited the Buddha's tooth in Kaifeng; an imperial emissary had to open the door to the build that housed it in the hall of seven treasures.

The Beijing tooth was discovered in 1900 when it was discovered in the ruins of Zhaoxian pagoda outside of Beijing. The monks of the nearby Lingguang monastery found a box in the rubble with the inscription "The Holy Tooth Relics of Sakyamuni Buddha", written by Shan-hui in 963 C.E. They kept the molar inside their monastery until 1955 when they donated it to the Buddhist Association of China. The Burmese ambassador asked whether Burma could have the relic; to which the Chinese Premier Zhou Enlai had offered. However, when a delegation went to retrieve the tooth it was housed in a golden jeweled casket instead of glass, and only offered to loan it to Burma for eight months. The Beijing tooth temple was reconstructed in 1966 in front of Buddhist delegations from 10 countries.

== Relics in India ==
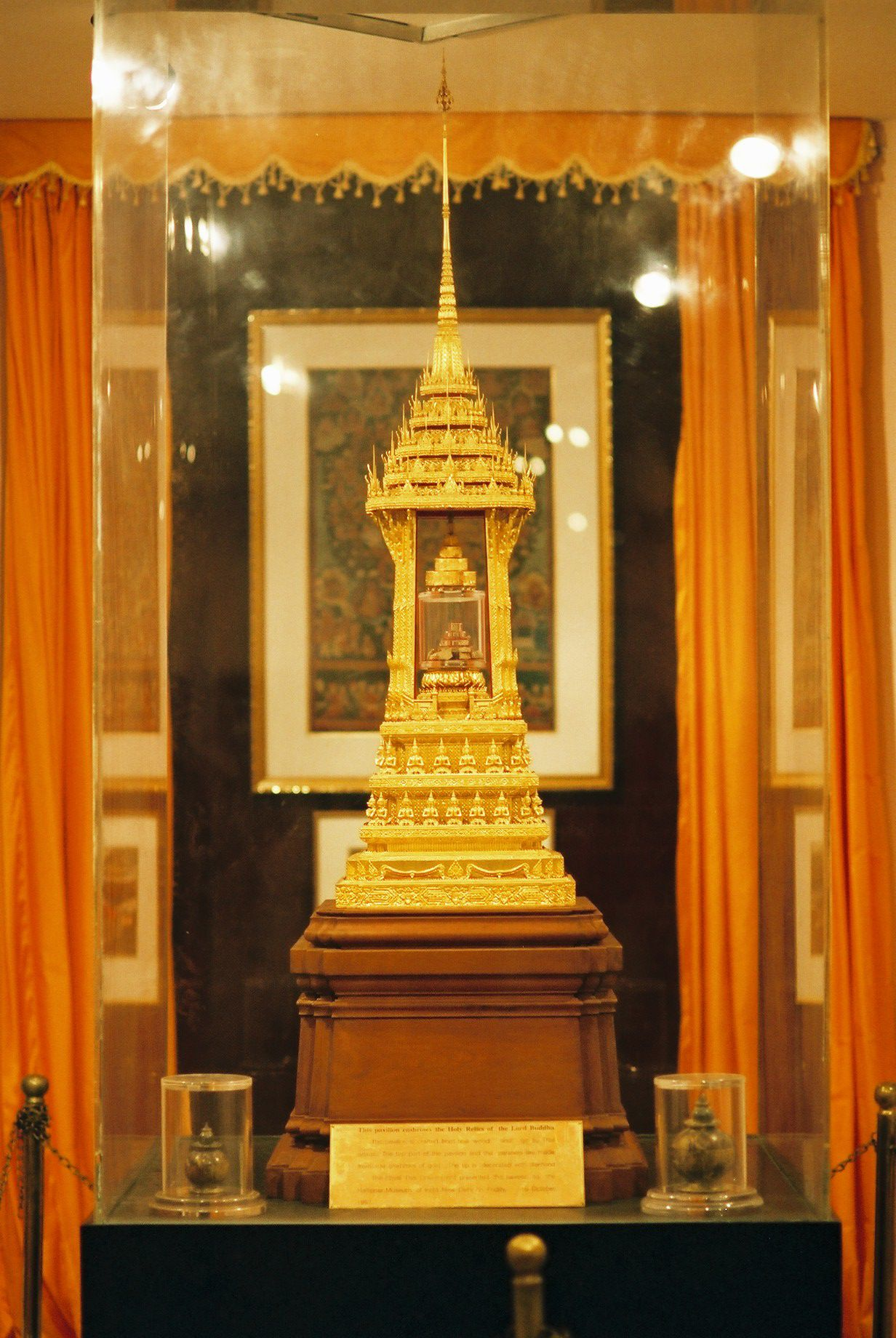
Buddha's relics at the National Museum, New Delhi

Buddha belonged to the Shakya clan, whose capital was located at Kapilavastu. During an excavation in 1898, William Claxton Peppe discovered five small vases containing bone fragments, ashes, and jewels in a long-forgotten stupa in Piprahwa, near Birdpur in the Basti district of Uttar Pradesh, India. A team led by K.M. Srivastava performed further excavations at the Piprahwa site between 1971 and 1973. The team discovered a casket containing fragments of charred bone and dated them to the 4th or 5th century BCE. Based upon the findings of these excavations, the Archaeological Survey of India (ASI) has identified Piprahwa as Kapilavastu. This conclusion is disputed by some authorities, including the Nepalese Department of Archaeology, which claims Tilaurakot as the historical location of Kapilavastu.

The Relic Stupa of Vaishali was built by Lichhavis in Vaishali as a mud stupa in the 5th century BCE. Noted archaeologists Anant Sadashiv Altekar and Sitaram Rai of the K.P. Jayaswal Research Institute led an archaeological excavation of this stupa from 1958 to 1962. A reliquary was discovered and removed from the core of the stupa; it was dated to the 5th century BCE. It was later determined that this reliquary contained ashes of the Buddha mixed with earth, a copper punch-marked coin, and several other items. The casket was brought to the Patna Museum in 1972, where it remains to this day.

Mortal remains of the Buddha belonging to the third or fourth century were found during an excavation in 1962–1963 at Devni Mori which is a Buddhist archaeological site near Shamalaji in Gujarat. Ashes of Buddha were found in a gold bottle wrapped in silk cloth within a copper bowl that was kept in a casket. The 1,700-year-old casket's inscription in Brahmi script mentions ‘Dashabala Sharira Nilaya’ — which stands for 'abode of the bodily relics of Lord Buddha'. The remains are preserved in the Museum of Department of Archaeology and Ancient History of the Faculty of Arts, Maharaja Sayajirao University of Baroda - Vadodara.

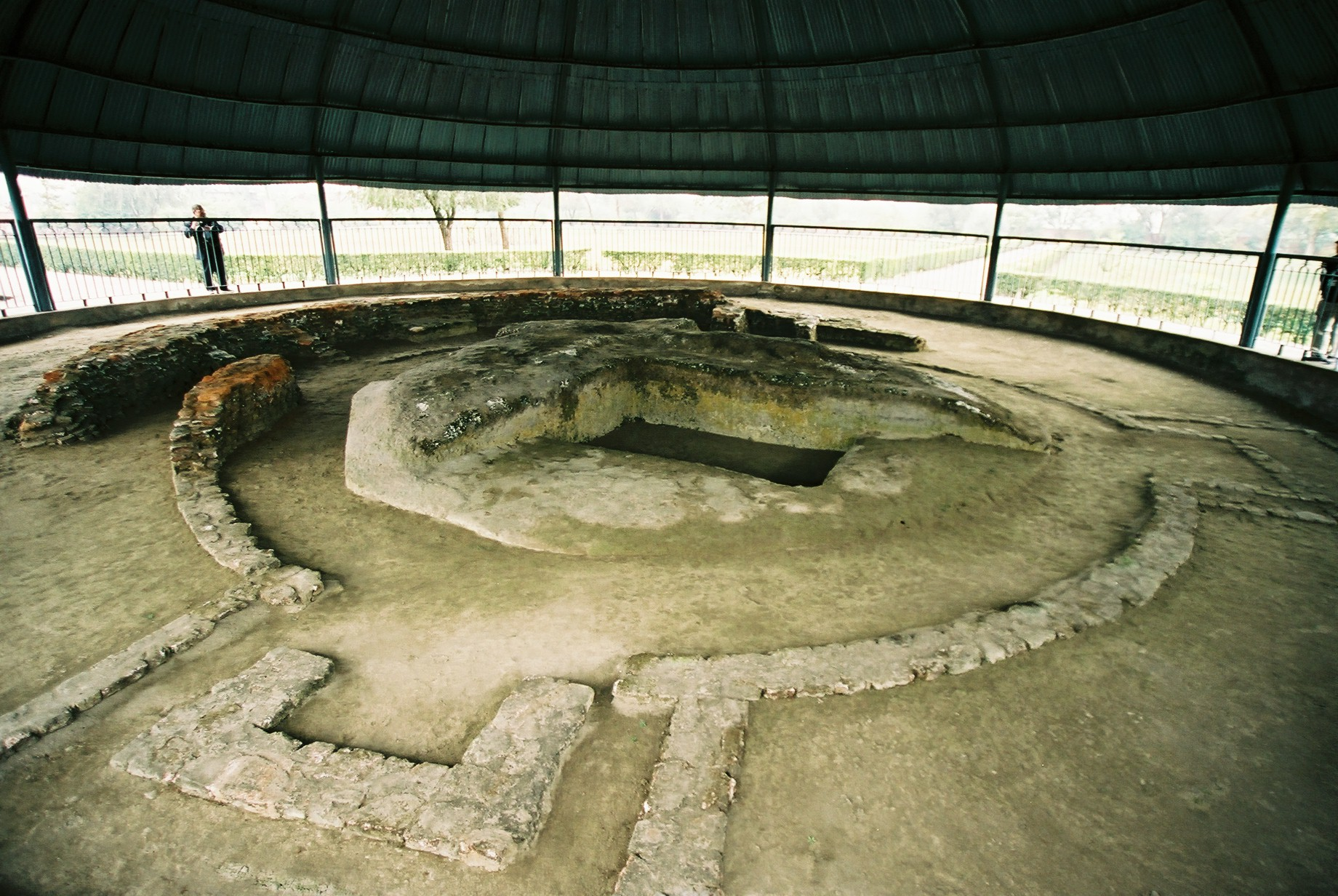
Relic Stupa of Vaishali, Bihar

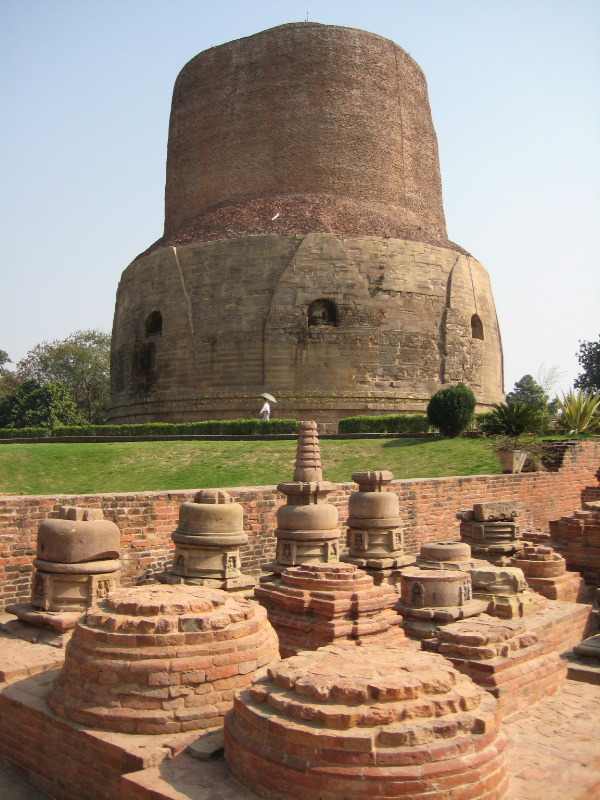
Dhamekh Stupa, Sarnath.

Dhamma Vinaya Monastery Pune located in western part of Maharashtra state. In the Sahyadri hill ranges near khadakwasala dam where Dhamma Vinaya Monastery Pune, a replica of Sanchi stupa constructed and relics of Gautam Buddha's and arhants was enshrined.

When the first dome of the Global Vipassana Pagoda was constructed in October 2006 in Mumbai; bone relics of the Buddha were enshrined in the central locking stone of the dome, making it the world's largest structure containing relics of the Buddha. The relics were originally found in the stupa at Bhattiprolu, Guntur district, Andhra Pradesh, India. They have been donated by the Mahabodhi Society of India and the prime minister of Sri Lanka to be kept at the Global Vipassana Pagoda. A casket was discovered in Lalitgiri in Orissa believed to contain bones of Buddha.

The Culvmsa relays the legend Silakala and King Moggallana who went to India in exile. Silakala became a novice at Bodhgaya where he was given a hair relic; Moggallana took this relic back to Sri Lanka and placed it in a crystal casket, and instigated a regular festival in honor of the hair.

Although king Bimbisara let the women in his palace visit Buddha in his monastery in the evenings; the women wanted a hair and nail stupa they could use to venerate the Buddha any time. After Bimbisara spoke with Buddha who complied with their request.

In Rajagrha, Buddha went to have his hair shaved, but none of the monks were willing to cut Buddha's hair; so they found a young boy named Upali of the barber cast. In the attempt to cut the hair better he controlled his body posture and breathing going into the fourth level of trance, dhyana. The Buddha's disciple seeing this Ananda took the razor from him; then wondered what to do with the hair; thinking it was an impure thing. Buddha reprimanded him and had Ananda deliver the hair in a pot to the general Gopali who took it into battle, becoming victorious.

According to Xuanzang's observation, hundreds of thousands of devotees came daily to venerate the tooth relic in Kanyakubja.

According to the Pali Dathavamsa (tooth chronicle) a disciple of Buddha named Khema took a tooth from Buddha's funeral pyre and gave it to Brahmadatta king of Kalinga (India). In Dantapura the tooth is taken by niganthas to King Gushava, then the Hindu emperor Pandu who attempts to destroy it in several different ways. Unable to destroy the tooth the king converts to Buddhism and venerates the tooth.

One hundred years prior to the visit of Xuanzang the Ephthalite Huns destroyed a number of relics in Kashmira and Gandhara. To escape one of the purges, a monk fled to India and paid pilgrimage to many sacred sites. One day he encountered a herd of wild elephants. He attempted to hide in a tree but was taken by the elephants to one of their young who had a bamboo splinter in his foot. He treated the elephant's wound and it rewarded him with a golden casket containing a tooth of Buddha. On the way back he ferried across a river that threatened to sink them mid-way. The passengers determined it was Nagas wanting the Buddha relic and convinced the monk to throw the tooth in the river. He would spend the next three years learning the proper rituals to tame the Nagas; subduing their king and reclaiming the tooth. He later did this successfully.

In 2025, the sacred Piprahwa relics of Lord Buddha, taken abroad during colonial rule after their discovery in 1898, were brought back to India. Prime Minister Narendra Modi called it a proud moment reflecting India's deep connection with Buddha and its commitment to cultural heritage. The government acted swiftly when the relics appeared in an international auction, reinforcing its resolve to preserve the sentiments of all communities in India.

== Relics in Indonesia ==
Borobudur in Java contains one of the Buddha's relics.

== Relics in Japan ==
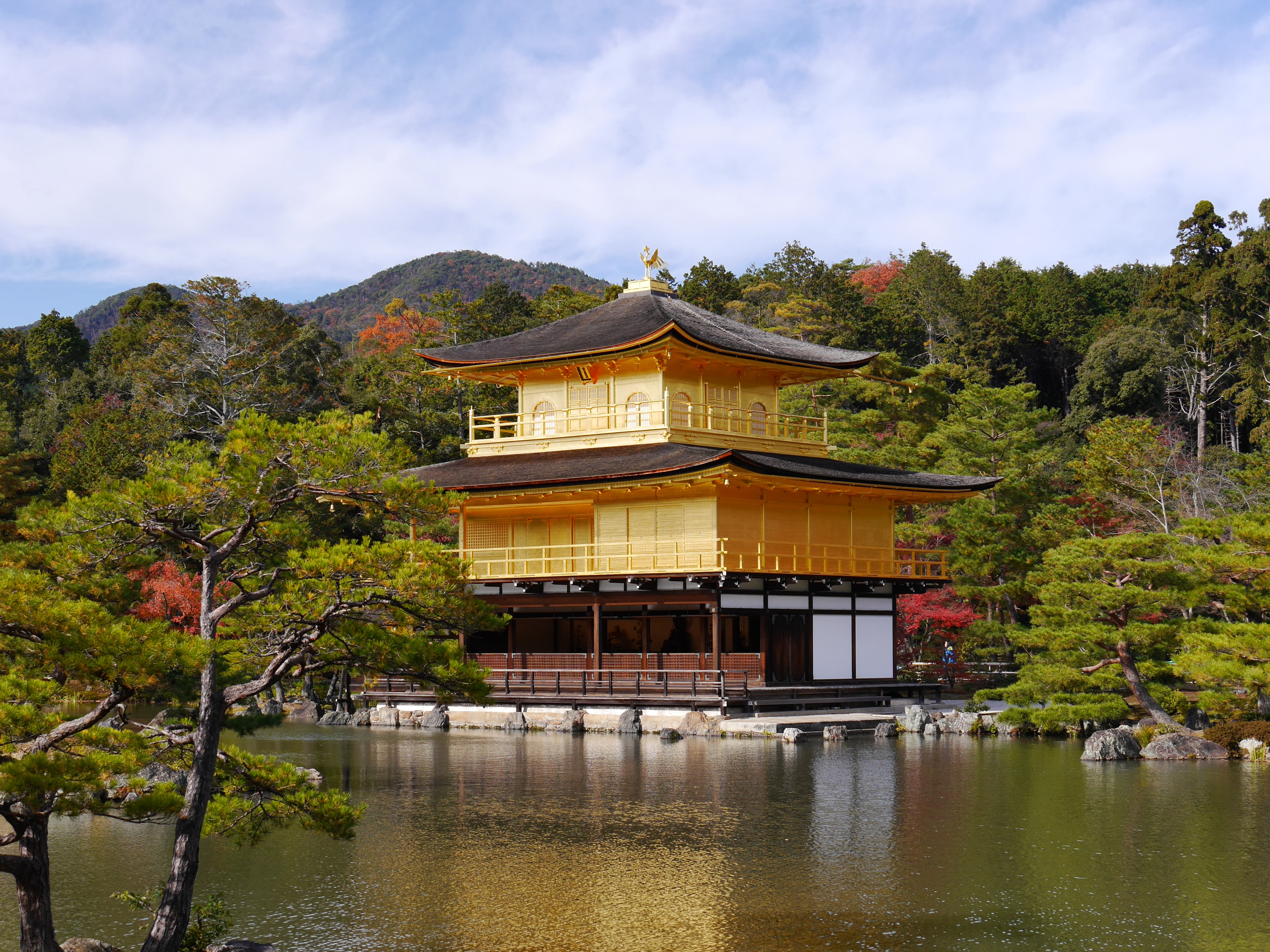
Shariden reliquary at Kinkaku-ji, Kyoto, Japan

Relics, known as shari (舎利; from Sanskrit śarīra), are often stored in a shariden (舎利殿; relic hall, reliquary). The Golden Pavilion at Kinkaku-ji in Kyoto is a well-known example of a shariden.

According to legend in Japan 552 C.E. there was an attempt to destroy a tooth relic, one of the first of Buddha's to arrive in the country; it was hit by a hammer into an anvil; the hammer and anvil were destroyed but the tooth was not. On January 15, 593, Soga no Umako ordered relics of Buddha deposited inside the foundation stone under the pillar of a pagoda at Asuka-dera. According to Japanese legends the tooth of Indras heaven would be stolen from Drona's turban by a demon called Sokushikki (demon fleet foot); however he was caught by an even faster divinity and the tooth was given to Indra. Although no mention is made of Xuanzang specifically having a tooth, a Japanese tradition claims one was eventually taken by the monk Gishin and kept in Tendai and Fujiwara.

== Relics in Korea ==
Tongdosa temple, (one of the three Three Jewel Temples of Korea), was founded by Jajang-yulsa after he returned from a pilgrimage to China in 646 AD. The temple houses a robe, begging bowl and a piece of skull said to belong to Buddha. Other temples built by Jajang also house relics. Bongjeongam hermitage is said to possess sarira from Gautama, while Sangwonsa houses bone relics. Additionally Jeongamsa Temple, and Beopheungsa Temple are said to contain relics. At Bulguksa Temple in South Korea, beneath a three-story stone pagoda; 46 sarira have been kept for over 1200 years, 2 more having appeared recently.

It is said that Chinese emperor Huizong tried to sink a tooth relic at sea but it was unable to do so, as Goryeo people secretly took and enshrined the relic in the Korean Peninsula.

== Relics in Laos ==
Pha That Luang is the most important national symbol of Laos. Buddhist missionaries from the Mauryan Empire are believed to have been sent by the Emperor Ashoka, including Bury Chan or Praya Chanthabury Pasithisak and five Arhata monks who brought a holy relic (believed to be the breast bone) of the Buddha to the stupa.

== Relics in Malaysia ==
In 2001, Mahindarama Buddhist Temple, located in George Town, became the first temple in Penang to house the relics of the Buddha. The two bone fragments of the Buddha had been presented to the temple's Chief Monk, Ven. E. Indaratana Maha Thera, while he was in India during the previous year. The relics are currently on display within the temple's main prayer hall.

In 2012, a small portion of the Buddha's relics was presented by the Thai royal family to Wat Chetawan in Petaling Jaya, Selangor, as a token of goodwill of Thai Buddhists towards Malaysian Buddhists. The relics had been discovered in Uttar Pradesh, India in 1898, before being gifted by India's British authorities to Siam's King Chulalongkorn.

Fa Yu Chan Si temples crystal pagoda contains relics from Gautama Buddha and other Buddhist masters.

In conjunction with 24 hours Metta around the World 2013, a silver-golden casket containing Gautama Buddha's relics was brought by Ven. Dhammananda from Sri Lanka to be enshrined in Samadhi Vihara, Shah Alam.

== Relics in Mongolia ==
According to legend, Abtai Sain Khan was given a Buddha relic by the third Dalai Lama. The fourteenth Dalai Lama prayed for this relic during his visit to Mongolia in 2011; its location was kept a close secret for concern it would be taken by the Soviet government.

== Relics in Myanmar ==
The Shwedagon Pagoda in Myanmar houses 8 strands of Buddha's hair taken by his first 2 disciples Tapussa and Bhallika; to the site where three relics of Buddha's previous incarnations had been enshrined. Shwedagon was created with the help of the King of Okkalapa and the Sule nat (spirit). Buddha's hairs are also said to be enshrined at Sule and Botataung Pagodas.

The Kanishka casket is said to have contained three bone fragments of the Buddha, which were forwarded to Burma by the British following the excavation, where they still remain in U Khandi's dazaung (hall).

The Uppatasanti Pagoda also holds a tooth relic from China.

The Chakesadhatuvamsa, or chronicle of the six hair relics of the Buddha, was written in Myanmar. The text says that the Buddha gave six hairs to disciples at Venuvana in Rajagrha. These were given to 6 bordering countries who had never seen the Buddha. The stories say that when the Buddha came to Mon State to give sermons, he gave six of his hairs to hermits from Kyaiktiyo, Zinkyaik (to Tissa), Mount Zwegabin (to Thiha), Kaylartha, Kyaikdaeyone and Myathabeik. A pair of belu brothers from Kyaikhtisaung also received a hair. All the hermits and belus enshrined the hair in great stones.

Burmese and Sri Lankan tradition says that Trapusa and Bhallika lost some of the hair relics to the Naga king Jayesana; who took them to worship in his undersea palace.

The Hledauk Pagoda in Burma crumbled during an earthquake in 1912; exposing 2 relic chambers. Inside was a vessel containing relics from the Buddha and small figures of bronze representing stages of his lives.

On his way flying through the air with 499 disciples to Sunaparanta, Buddha stopped at Saccabandha where he talked the heretic teacher of the same name into becoming an arhat. On his way home from Sunapranta Buddha stopped by the banks of the Nammada river where he was welcomed by a devote Buddhist naga king who asked for a memento to honour, so he left an impression of his footprint in the river bank. They visited Saccabandha again who asked for something to honour as well; Buddha obliged by pressing his foot into solid stone.

== Relics in Nepal ==
According to UNESCO, Ramagrama stupa is the only undisturbed original stupa containing relics of Lord Buddha; built in the 5th century BCE. Nepal believes Tilaurakot to be Kapilavastu, and nominated it along with Lumbini for world heritage status. An excavation at Tilaurakot in 1962 revealed ancient brick structures but no relics. In 1970's thousands of Buddha relics were said to begin growing out of the east side of the stupa of Swayambhunath in Kathmandu. According to Xuanzang, relics of Koṇāgamana Buddha were held in a stupa in Nigalisagar; visited by Ashoka, in what is now southern Nepal.

== Relics in Pakistan ==
The stupa built in what is now Peshawar by Kanishka of the Kushan Empire in the second century has been described as one of the tallest in the world and has been visited by early Chinese Buddhist pilgrims such as Faxian, Sung Yun and Xuanxang. In Peshawar, Faxian reported in the fourth century that the Buddha's begging bowl held 4 liters and was made of stone, made of four bowls bestowed upon him by the four guardian gods of the four quarters of mount Vinataka surrounding mount Sumeru. Another legend is of a Yuezhi king who wanted to take away the bowl but could not with the strength of eight elephants, so he constructed a stupa over it.

The stupa was excavated in 1908–1909 by a British archaeological mission; where the Kanishka casket was discovered with three small fragments of bone. Three pieces of bone (approx 1½ in. or 3.8 cm long) were found in a crystal reliquary in a bronze casket bearing an effigy of Kanishka and an inscription recording his gift. They were removed to Mandalay in 1910 by Gilbert Elliot-Murray-Kynynmound, 4th Earl of Minto, the Governor-General of India, for safekeeping. They were originally kept in a stupa in Mandalay but it has become dilapidated and is used as housing. The relics are being kept in a nearby monastery until funds can be found to build a new stupa to house the relics next to Mandalay Hill. The crystal reliquary holding the bones is now enclosed in a gold and ruby casket provided by Burmese devotees.

== Relics in Persia ==
Xuanzang said that the Buddha's begging bowl had found its way to Persia after spending time in many different countries. It is said the bowl will one day be given to Maitreya Buddha. According to Faxian however, Buddha's alms bowl took several hundred years to travel across several countries before being taken by a naga king. The bowl would then reappear at Mount Vinataka, where it would be divided into the original four bowls and given to the four guardian kings to bestow on Maitreya. Maitreya would then press the bowls together forming one again, with the next thousand buddhas repeating this same process; using the same bowl. According to Daoxuan, the Buddha's bowl — given to him at the time he was offered milk rice — was made of clay. It was bestowed by a mountain deity who had been given the bowl by the previous Kassapa Buddha. The bowl was later repaired by Indra and the guardians of the four quarters crafted thousands of stone replicas, which were placed in thousands of stupas all over the world.

== Relics in Russia ==
In 2011 the head of the Buddhist Patriarchy of Sri Lanka met with Kirsan Ilyumzhinov to discuss the movement of relics from Sri Lanka to the Republic of Kalmykia. Former president Kirsan Ilyumzhinov will become the next guardian of these Buddha relics.

== Relics in Singapore ==
The tooth relic is housed in the Buddha Tooth Relic Temple and Museum in the Chinatown district of Singapore. It is claimed the relic was found in a collapsed stupa in Myanmar.

== Relics in Sri Lanka ==
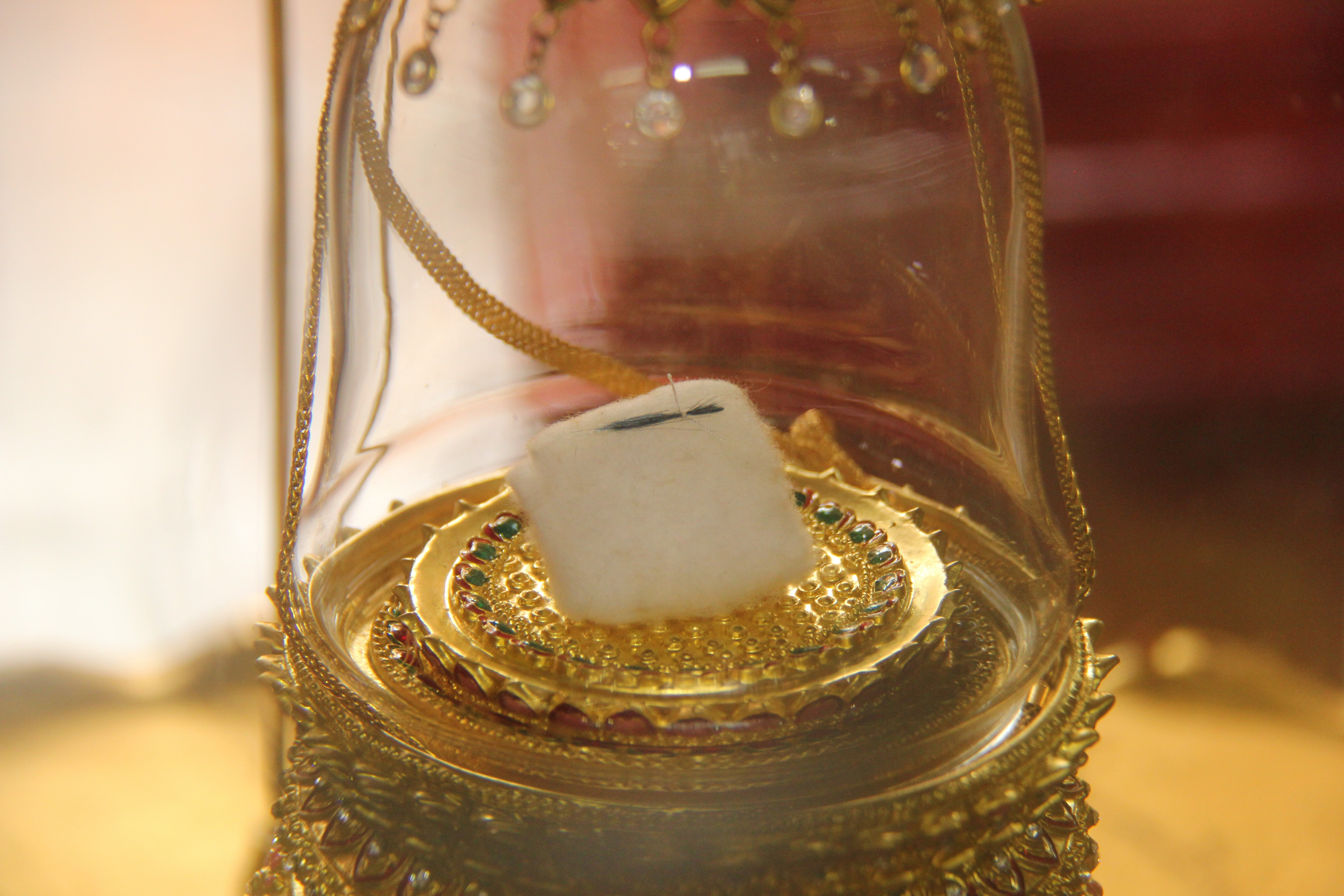
Hair Relics of Gautama Buddha on display at the Gangaramaya Temple in Colombo

In the Mahavamsa, Ashoka chooses not to retrieve Buddha relics in the possession of Nagas at Ramagrama. It was said that on his deathbed Buddha told a prophecy that of the eight dronas of his body relics, one would be venerated by the Koliyas of Ramagrama, then the relics would belong to the Nagas until being enshrined in Sri Lanka. Ashoka is told more prophecy by arhats, who speak of the future enshrinement of these relics by King Dutugemunu.

The two quarts of relics that were enshrined in the village Rāmagāma were, according to The Buddha's determination, destined to be enshrined in the Great Stūpa Ruvanveli. King Dutugemunu who, on the full-moon day of the month of Āsāëha (June–July), under the constellation of Uttarāsāëha, would officiate in the ceremony for the enshrining of the relics in the Great Stūpa, worshipped the Sangha (Order of monks) on the day before the full-moon day, reminded them that tomorrow is the appointed day for the enshrining of the relics and requested them to give him the relics. The Sangha ordered then the novice Arahant Soõuttara, who was gifted with the six supernormal faculties, to bring the relics, which Arahant Soõuttara manages to bring and offer to the Sangha.

Tradition says that Trapusa and Bahalika visited Sri Lanka and brought a hair relic with them in a golden reliquary to Girihandu. Trapusa and Bhallika had initially been disgusted by the hair and fingernail relics. Only after he explains the Jataka tale of Sumedha laying his hair at the feet of Dipamkara are they convinced this is meritorious.

Buddha is said to have given hair relics to Maha Sumana the god of Sumanakuta, which were enshrined at Mahiyangana; he is also believed to have left a footprint at Sumanakuta.

In 1561 in Portuguese Goa, a tooth taken from Sri Lanka said to belong to the Buddha was crushed, burned in a brazier then tossed into the river in front of a crowd by archbishop Don Gaspar. Don Juan Dharmapala the Christian king of Kotte claimed to have to the Kandy tooth. However, according to the Culavamsa; Konnappu Bandara; who had betrayed the Portuguese also claimed to possess the tooth. He used his possession of the tooth along with his marriage to a Kandyan princess to seize the throne. The celebrated procession of the tooth in Kandy coincides with an earlier celebration dedicated to Vishnu.

Thuparamaya, the first dagoba to be constructed in Sri Lanka, was constructed by King Devanampiyatissa (247-207 BCE) in the city of Anuradhapura. It is said to enshrine the right collarbone of the Buddha.

When the Danta and Hemamala family arrive in Sri Lanka in 362-409 CE, they deliver one of the four eye teeth relics to King Sirimeghavanna; who places it with the bowl relic. The relics remain together in Anuradhapura for 600 years until being moved to the new capital of Polonnaruva; at which point it becomes the most venerated relic in Sri Lanka. It is believed the bowl produces rainfall, a 14th-century legend says that king Upatissa put an end to a drought by filling the bowl with water, and sprinkling the ground while following a cart with a golden statue of Buddha. It is said the Buddha's disciple Ananda had done with when Vaisali suffered from famine and pestilence from drought. In the twelfth century at Parakkamabahu's festival for the tooth relic, a rain cloud filled the ponds but did not rain on the celebration.

Then king Dutugemunu received from the Sangha the Buddha's relics upon his head in a casket and departed from the golden pavilion in the midst of manifold offerings and honours made by gods and Brahma. He circumambulated the relic-chamber three times, entered it from the east, and then laid the relic casket on a couch of one koñi worth's silver that was arranged in the north side. An image of the Buddha was then, according to the Buddha's determination, created in the lion's reclining posture (sīhaseyya), and all the relics were enshrined within that image. When the enshrining of the relics in the Great Stūpa Ruvanveli was completed, the two novices Uttara and Sumana closed the relic chamber with the stone blocks that were previously hidden to be used as a lid.

In the Thupavamsa numerous types of beings attended the enshrinement of the relics into the Mahathupa; including the Naga king Mahakala who until recently guarded them. The relics were to be placed atop a golden throne crafted by Visvakarma the divine artificer; the throne brought by Indra. Brahma offers his invisible umbrella of sovereignty, with the king Dutugemunu offering his own. The arhat Indagutta creates a metal canopy over the universe, so that Mara will not interfere, as monks chanted the sutra pitaka. Dutugemunu ceremoniously enters with the urn atop his head; but as he is about to place the urn on the golden throne, the relics rise into the air and form Buddha, with each of the 32 major signs and 8 lesser signs of a great man. In this form he performs the twin miracle of fire and water, fulfilling the fifth of his deathbed resolutions. One hundred and twenty million deities and humans gain arhatship from this experience. The relics return to the urn and they are laid to rest and the chamber sealed with forty-meter stone slabs.

== Relics in Thailand ==
The Piprahwa relics were given to Rama V (the King of Siam) a couple of years after their discovery in 1898, where they still reside. Rama V had Phu Khao Thong, a man-made mountain constructed at Wat Saket. After 1888 the Stupa would house a Buddha relic from Sri Lanka alongside relics from prisoners. Phra Borommathat Chedi is the oldest stupa containing Buddha relics in Thailand. Wat Phra That Doi Suthep was founded after a monk followed a dream and found a shoulder bone that glowed and replicated itself; leading him to believe it was a Buddha relic. (phra that). Wat Com Ping in northern Thailand claims to enshrine over 50,000 buddha relics. Relics of the head were found in Teankam temple, Lampang province in 2007. The temple was built by King Indraditya in the 12th century.

== Relics in Tibet ==
An exhibit donated by the Dalai Lama features relics from Gautama Buddha as well as 40 other Buddhist masters from India, Tibet and China; taken with him out of Tibet after the 1959 invasion. The exhibit was the idea of Lama Zopa Rinpoche; it started in 2001 and has toured 61 countries.

== Relics in the United States ==
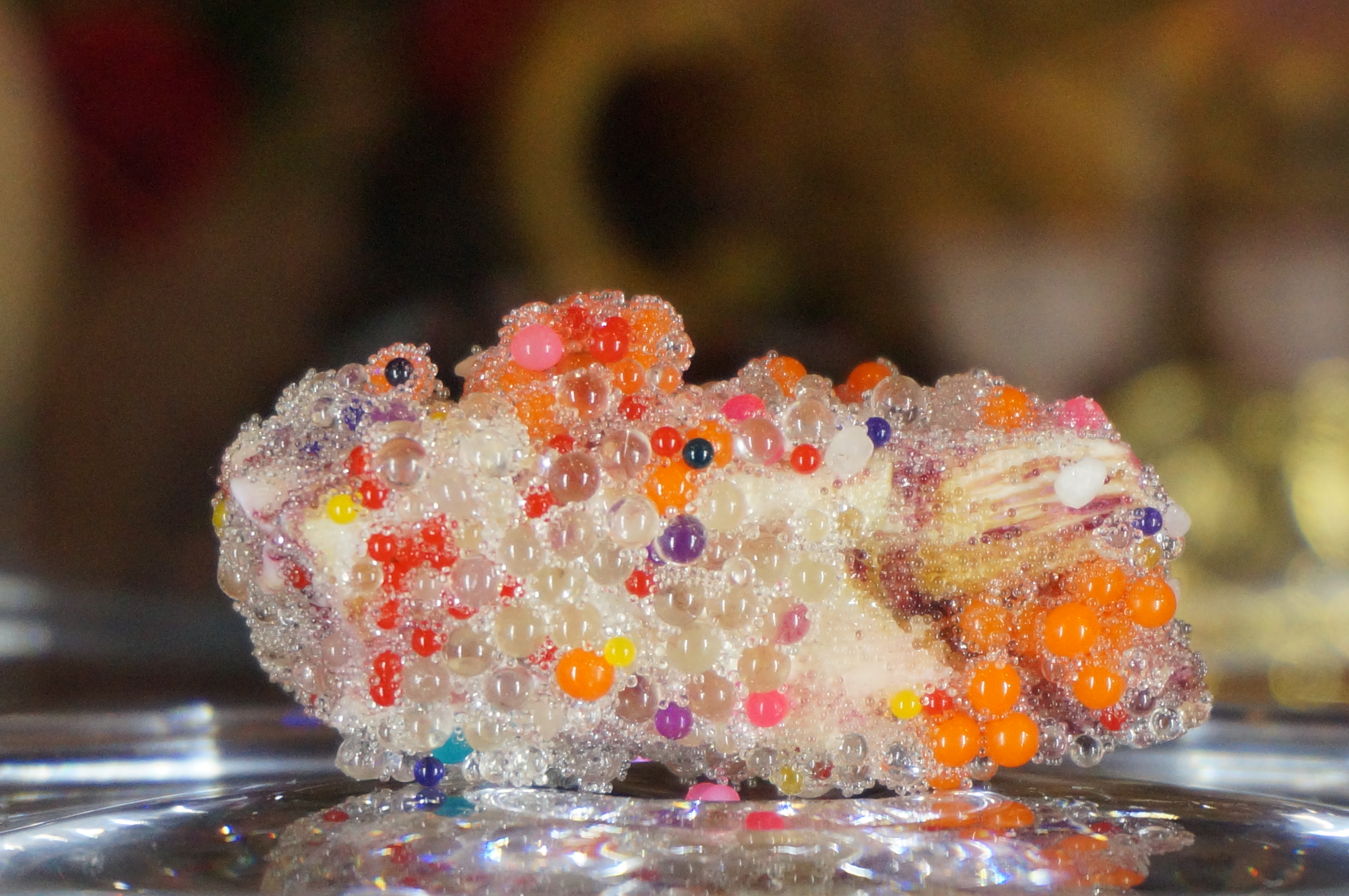
A Buddha Tooth with attached "baby relics" from the 10,000 Buddha Relics Collection

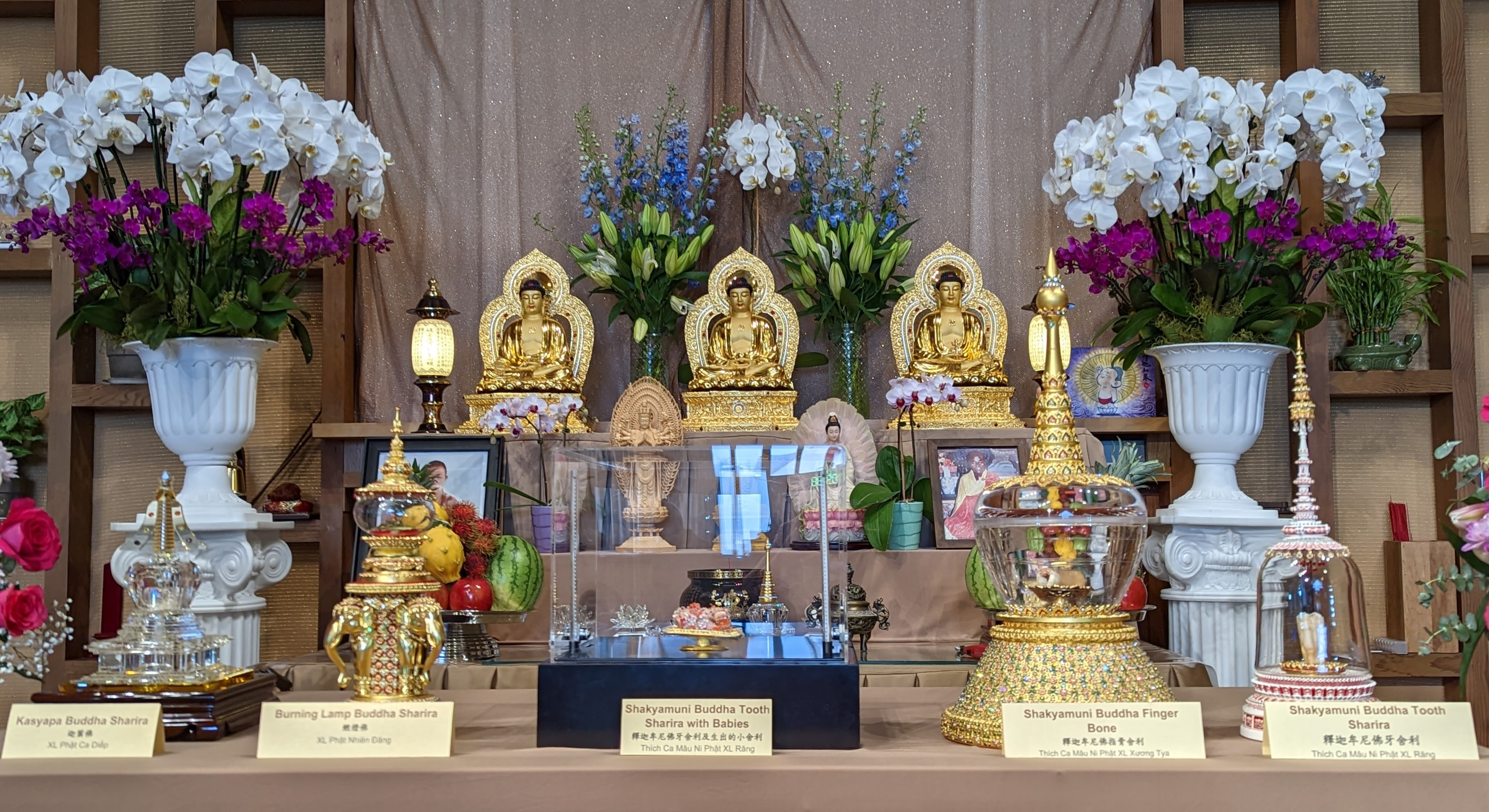
Buddha Relics displayed at the altar of Dharma Treasury Temple during the 10,000 Buddha Relics Exhibition Sep 2022

Bodhi Light International, Inc., a non-profit organization headquartered at Southern California, hosts The 10,000 Buddha Relics Collection, which is the largest known collection of Buddha relics in the United States. This collection includes two teeth, one hair, a finger bone, and thousands of gem-like relics believed to belong to Shakyamuni Buddha and his close family members and disciples. The relics in the collection are known for the phenomenon of producing new colorful crystals called "baby relics".

The collection has been on exhibition to public twice a year since 2013 at Lu Mountain Temple in Rosemead, CA and Dharma Treasury Temple in San Francisco, which attracted tens of thousands of visitors. Most of these relics come from Asian countries such as Myanmar, Thailand, Sri Lanka, and Vietnam.

The exhibit was featured in Season 5, Episode 10 of the History Channel series “The UnXplained” with William Shatner June 2023.

== Relics in Vietnam ==
Xa Loi Pagoda served as the headquarters for Buddhism in South Vietnam during the Vietnam War, its construction began in 1956 to house remains of the Buddha. Giác Lâm Pagoda has housed Buddha relics since they were brought to the temple from Sri Lanka by Narada in 1953. Tịnh Xá Trung Tâm founded in 1965 also houses relics.

== Relics in Heaven ==
It is said the placenta of Buddha ratnavyuha was taken by Brahma to be enshrined in a stupa. When Buddha left the palace to seek enlightenment he severed his hair with a sword. According to Theravada sources, throwing his top knot into the air, and says if he is to be Buddha it will remain in the sky. It stays at a height of one league, until it is taken by God Sakra to Trayastrimsa heaven. Mulasarvastivada Vinaya recounts how a friend of Kasyapa Buddha named Ghatikara gives him a monastic robe, bowl, razor, girdle, needle and water strainer. In another version the Bodhisattva encounters this divinity disguised as a hunter and trades him his Varanasi silk robes; which are enshrined in a catiya. Alternatively, new robes came to Buddha from ten brothers from Kapilavastu who received hemp robes from their mother, about to parinirvanize they told her to give the robes to the Buddha; foreseeing his birth. The mother gave the robes to her daughter near death; who gave them to a tree spirit to give to the son of Suddhodana. Indra disguises as a hunter, then takes the robes from the tree and gives them to Buddha in exchange for the silk robes; which he enshrines in heaven and dedicates a festival to the robes. The bowl in which Buddha received milk rice after his long fast is said to have floated down the Nairanjana River before sinking down to the Naga King Kala putting it with the bowls of the three previous Buddhas.

== Bibliography ==
- Analla, Ds. (2015). Aung, Naing Htet (ed.). Ashin Pannadipa and His Exertions (in English and Burmese). Myanmar.
- Brekke, Torkel (2007). Bones of Contention: Buddhist Relics, Nationalism and the Politics of Archaeology, Numen 54 (3), 270–303
- Germano, David; Kevin Trainor (ed.) (2004). Embodying the Dharma. Buddhist Relic Veneration in Asia. New York: SUNY Press
- Strong, J.S. (2007), Relics of the Buddha, Princeton University Press, ISBN 978-0-691-11764-5
