= Parinirvana Stupa =

Buddhist temple in Kushinagar, India

- परिनिर्वाण स्तूप
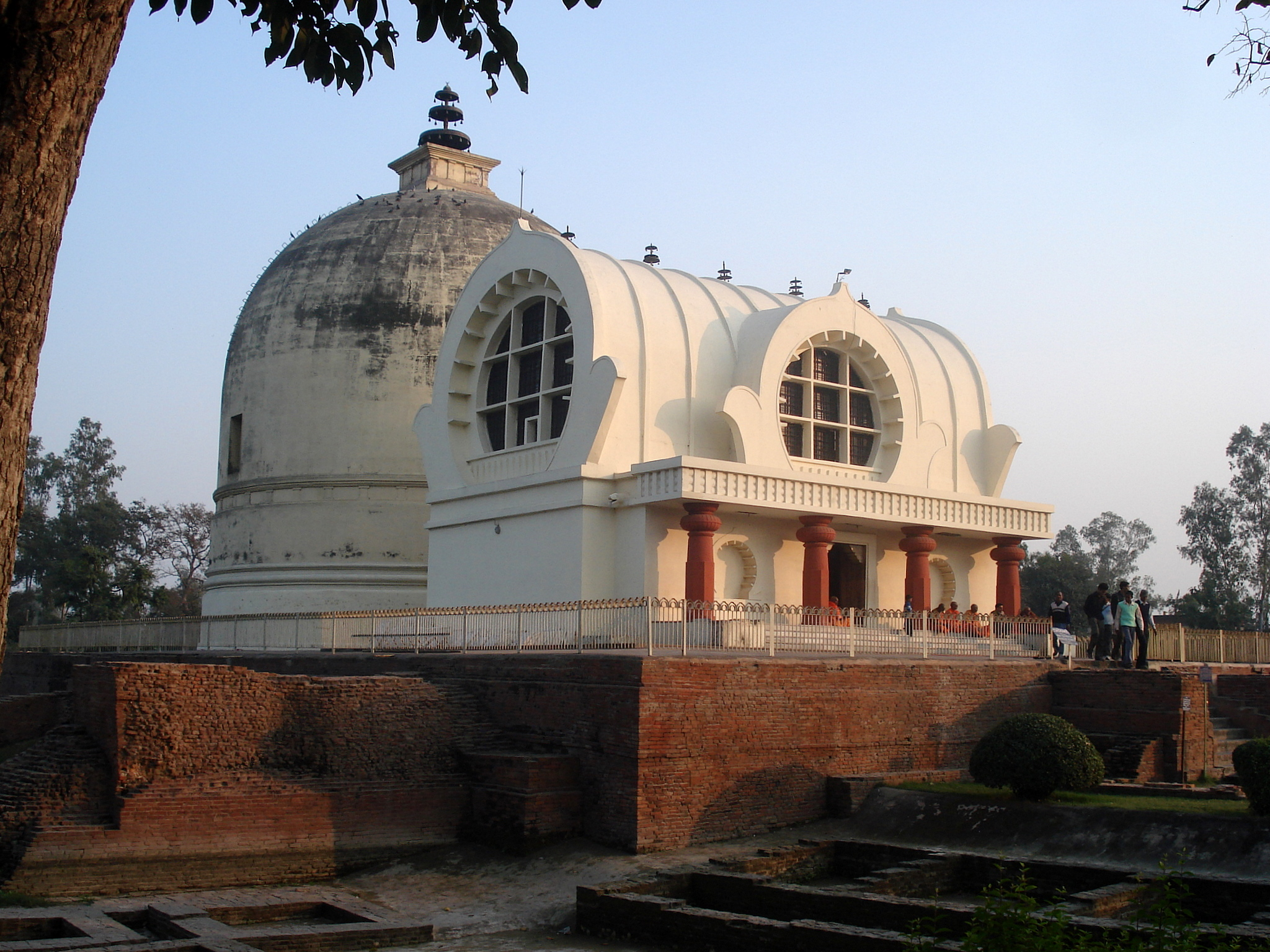
- The Parinirvana Temple with the Parinirvana Stupa, Kushinagar

- Location within Uttar Pradesh

Religion
- Affiliation: Buddhism

Location
- Location: Kushinagar, Uttar Pradesh
- Country: India
- Coordinates: 26.741°N 83.888°E

Architecture
- Completed: 413-55 B.C.

Website
- kushinagar.nic.in

The Parinirvana Stupa or Mahaparinirvana Temple is a Buddhist temple in Kushinagar, India which is said to be the place of death of Gautama Buddha, the founder of Buddhism. Alexander Cunningham gains the most attention for his work in the area, because he conclusively proved that Gautama Buddha had died in the area. The present temple was built by the Indian Government in 1956 as part of the commemoration of the 2,500th year of the Mahaparinivana or 2500 BE (Buddhist Era). Inside this temple, there is a Reclining Buddha image lying on its right side with the head to the north. The statue is 6.1 m long and rests on a stone couch.

== History ==
After 45 years of missionary activities, the Buddha, severely stricken with illness, finally reached to Kushinagar, where he ordained his last disciple and uttered his last words to the sangha and attained Parinirvana in 487 BCE. Maurya king Ashoka reportedly visited Kushinagar in 260 BCE where he built several caityas, stupas to honor the Buddha's place of Nirvana. Buddhist sites in Kushinagar were steadily expanded during the Kushan empire (c. 50-241 CE), while Kushinagar witnessed a golden age during the Gupta empire (c. 320-647 CE) when the Parinirvana Stupa was largely expanded and Parinirvana Temple was reconstructed along with a huge reclining Buddha statue. Alexander Cunningham, a British archaeologist noted the existence of a huge vaulted chamber which he dated no later than 637 AD with the reclining Buddha. The reclining Buddha statue and temple were discovered and excavated along with the adjoining stupa, and were restored in March 1877. The statue was found broken and scattered into numberless fragments and was entirely reconstructed and the temple also repaired, and roofed by the Archaeological Survey of India. The temple has been illustrated in a 14th century history book Jami' al-tawarikh.

Perhaps the most interesting example is the vaulted chamber enshrining the colossal statue of the Nirvana Buddha at Kusinagara. As this statue was seen by Hwen Thsang in A.D. 637, the use of the arch was certainly both known to and practised by the Hindus at that time.

— Alexander Cunningham, Mahâbodhi, or the great Buddhist temple under the Bodhi tree at Buddha-Gaya

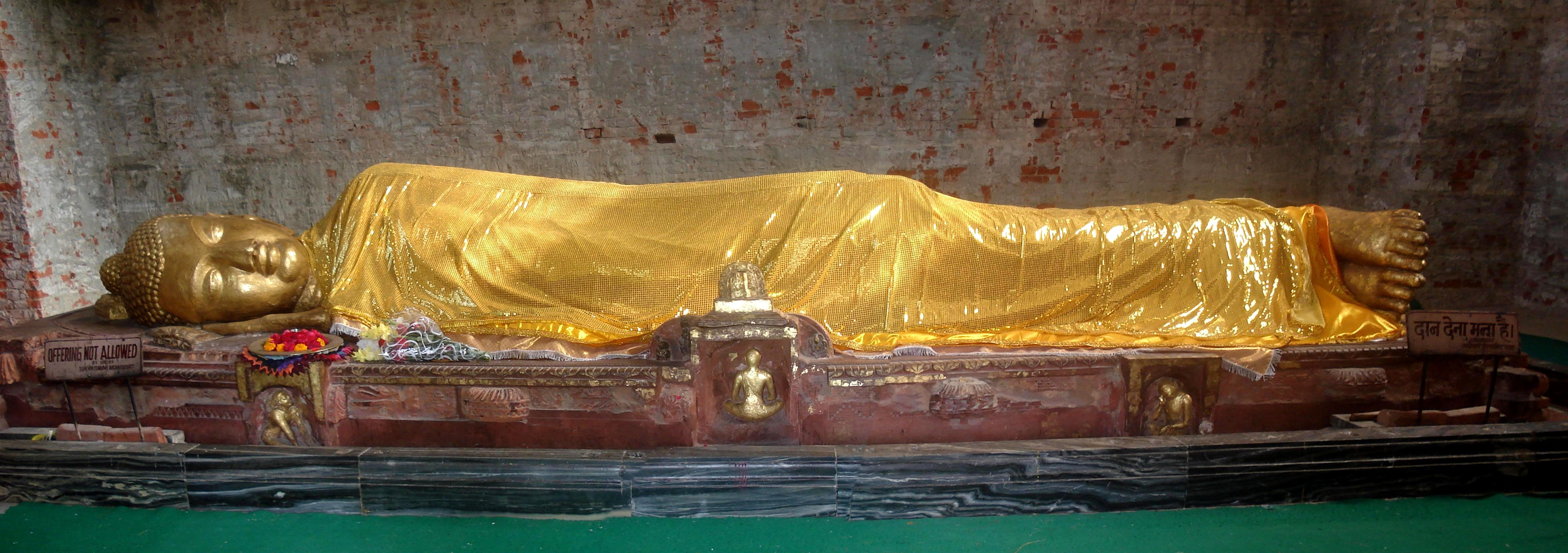
Reclining Buddha statue.
