= Buli (tribe) =

Republican tribe in Iron-Age India

- c. 7th century BCE–c. 5th-4th century BCE
- The Mahajanapadas in the post-Vedic period. Buli was located close to the north of Magadha.
- Capital: Allakappa
- Common languages: Prakrit; Sanskrit
- Religion: Buddhism; Historical Vedic religion Jainism
- Government: Republic
- Rājā
- Historical era: Iron Age
  - Established: c. 7th century BCE
  - Conquered by Magadha: c. 5th-4th century BCE
Succeeded by
Magadha
- Today part of: India; Nepal

Buli (Pāli: Buli) was an ancient Indo-Aryan tribe of north-eastern South Asia whose existence is attested during the Iron Age. The population of Buli was organised into a gaṇasaṅgha (an aristocratic oligarchic republic).

== Location ==
The territory of the Bulayas was located near Magadha, and their neighbours were the Brāhmaṇa tribe of Veṭhadīpa-Droṇagrāma.

The capital city of the Bulis was the city of Allakappa.

== Name ==
The exact origin of the name of the Buli tribe is unknown, although it might have been derived from the Sanskrit root bul, meaning to "cause to sink" or "to submerge."

The name of the Buli capital of Allakappa might have been a compound of the terms alla, meaning "moist" or "wet," and kappa (kalpa in Sanskrit), meaning "anything made with a definite object in view" or "that which is fit and suitable." The name Allakappa would thus have meant "suitably damp" or "almost damp."

== History ==
The Bulis became Buddhists during the life of the Buddha, and after he died and was cremated in the city of Kusinārā, the Bulis sent a messenger to the Mallakas of Kusinārā to demand a share of his relics.

== Political and social organisation ==
=== Republican institutions ===
The Bulis were a kṣatriya tribe organised into a gaṇasaṅgha (an aristocratic oligarchic republic).

==== The Assembly ====
Like the other gaṇasaṅgha, the ruling body of the Buli republic was an Assembly of the kṣatriya elders who held the title of rājās (meaning "chiefs").

==== The Council ====
The Assembly met rarely, and the administration of the republic was instead in the hands of the Council, which was a smaller body of the Assembly, whose members were elected from the assembly. The Council met more often than the Assembly.

==== The Consul ====
The Buli Assembly elected for life a consul rājā who held the title of Allakappa-rājā ("chief of Alakappa"). The consul rājā administered the republic with the assistance of the Assembly and Council.

== Sources ==
- Sharma, J. P. (1968). Republics in Ancient India, C. 1500 B.C.-500 B.C. Leiden, Netherlands: E. J. Brill. ISBN 978-9-004-02015-3.
