= Brāhmaṇas of Vethadipaka =

Tribe in Iron-Age India

Vethadipaka-Dronagramakas
- c. 7th century BCE–c. 5th-4th century BCE
- The Mahajanapadas in the post-Vedic period. Brāhmaṇa was located close to the north of Magadha.
- Capital: Veṭhadīpa-Doṇagāma
- Common languages: Prakrit; Sanskrit
- Religion: Buddhism; Historical Vedic religion Jainism
- Historical era: Iron Age
  - Established: c. 7th century BCE
  - Conquered by Magadha: c. 5th-4th century BCE
Succeeded by
Magadha
- Today part of: India

The Vethadipaka-Dronagramakas were an ancient Indo-Aryan tribe of north-eastern South Asia whose existence is attested during the Iron Age. They were Brahmins and notable as they received shares in the Buddha's relics after his death.

== Location ==
The territory of the Brāhmaṇas was located near Magadha, and their neighbours were the Buli tribe of Allakappa.

The capital city of the Brāhmaṇas was named in Pali alternatively Veṭhadīpa (Viṣṇudvīpa in Sanskrit) or Doṇagāma (Droṇagrāma in Sanskrit).

== History ==
After the Buddha's death, the Brāhmaṇas of Veṭhadīpa-Doṇagāma were given a share of his relics.

== Political and social organisation ==
Little is known about the Brāhmaṇas of Veṭhadīpa-Doṇagāma other than that they belonged to the Dhūmra gotra.

== Sources ==
- Sharma, J. P. (1968). Republics in Ancient India, C. 1500 B.C.-500 B.C. Leiden, Netherlands: E. J. Brill. ISBN 978-9-004-02015-3.
