= Zenyōmitsu-ji =

Buddhist temple in Setagaya, Tokyo, Japan

Coordinates: 35°36′06″N 139°38′31″E

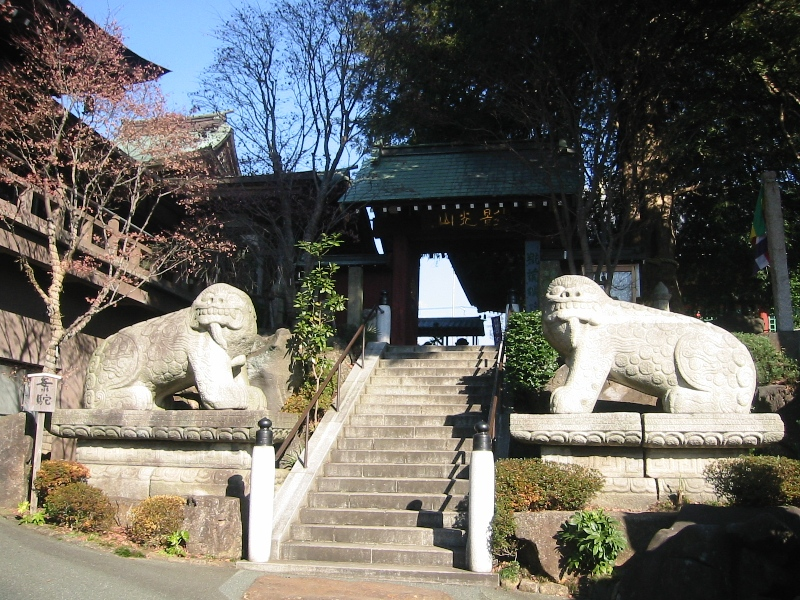

Religion
- Affiliation: Buddhist

Location
- Location: 2-7-11 Noge, Setagaya, Tokyo
- Country: Japan
- Interactive map of Zenyōmitsu-ji

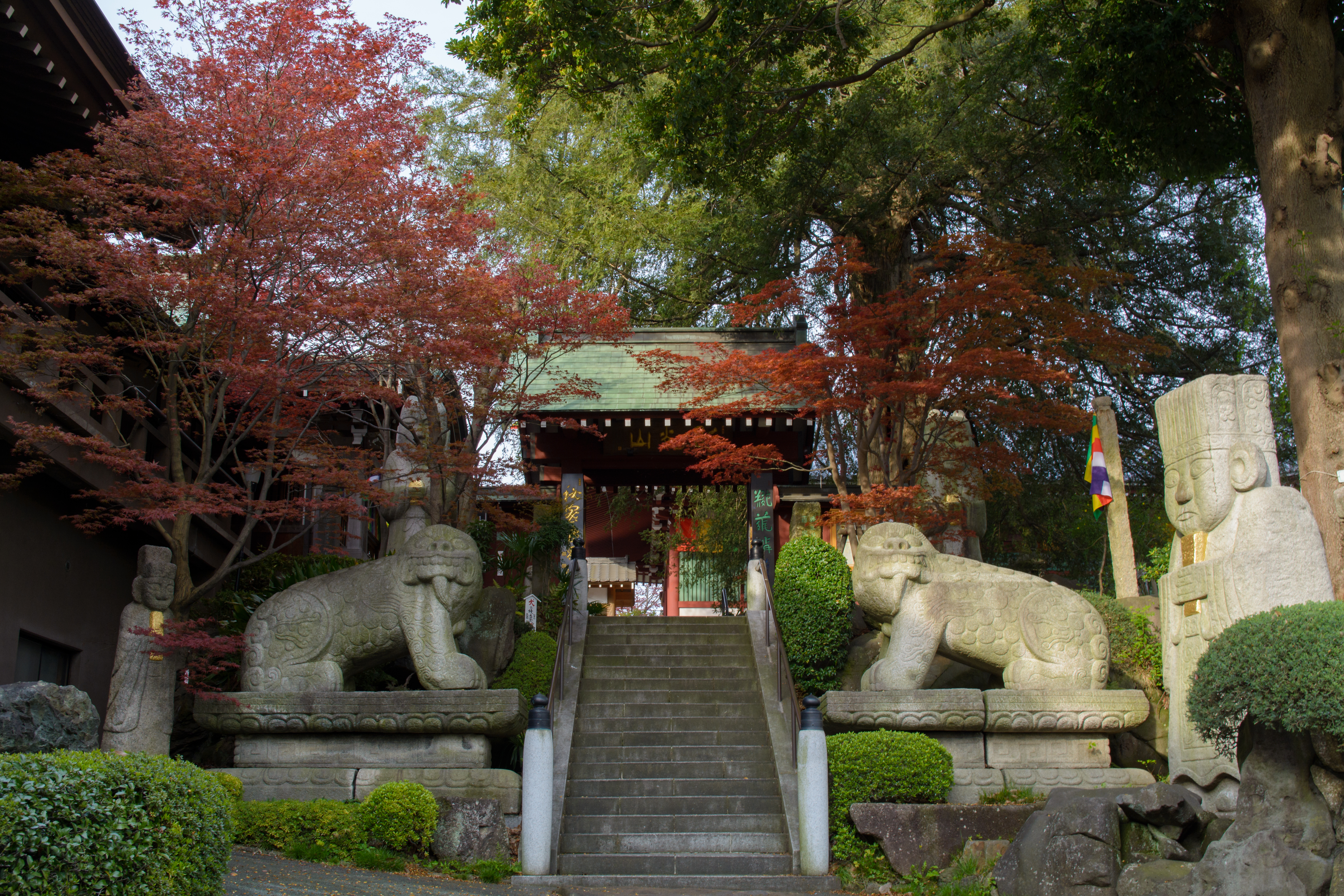
The entrance to Zenyōmitsu-ji

Zenyōmitsu-ji (善養密寺) is a Buddhist temple in the Setagaya ward of Tokyo, Japan. The temple follows the Shingon creed of Vajrayana Buddhism, which attaches particular importance to the origins of Buddhism and its manifestation throughout history.

Zenyōmitsu-ji has a rich collection of authentic historical artifacts from India, Central Asia and China. Most notable is an exceptional collection of art from Gandhara, which was gathered over the course of twenty years by the head of the Temple.

== Transportation ==
The temple is about a 15-minute walk from Todoroki Station on the Tokyu Oimachi Line.

== Artworks ==
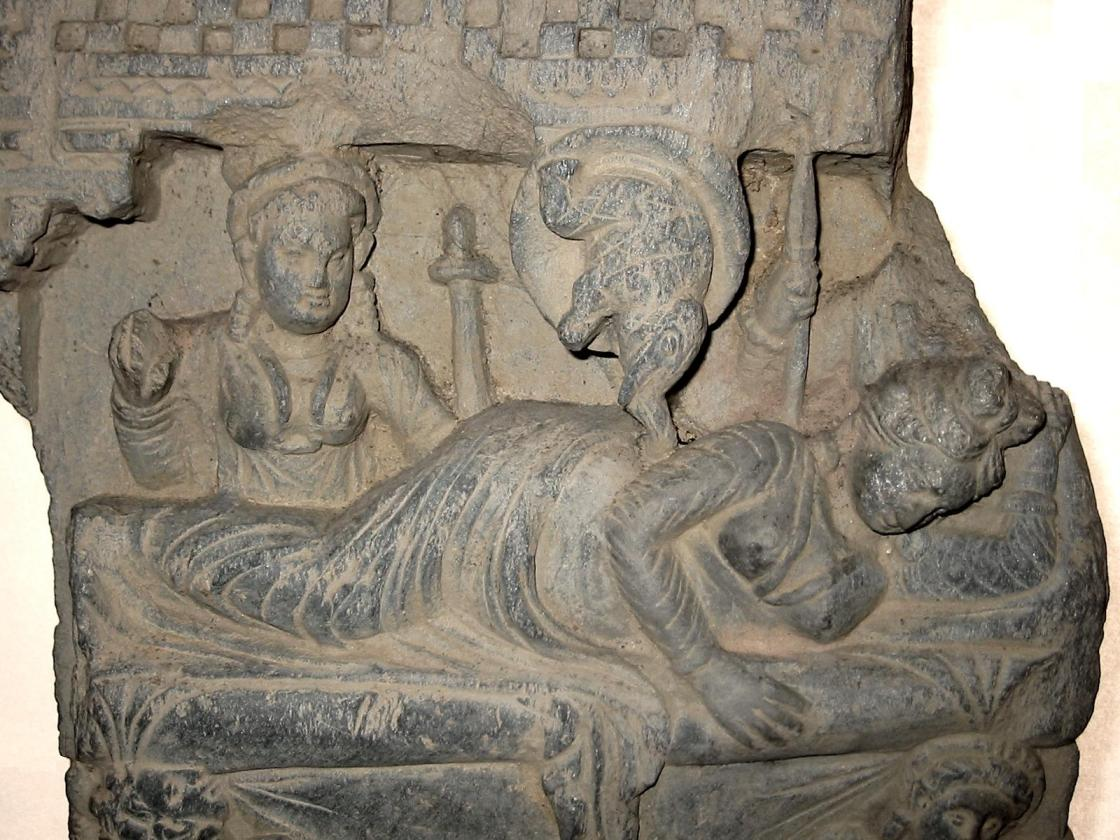
The dream of Queen Maya

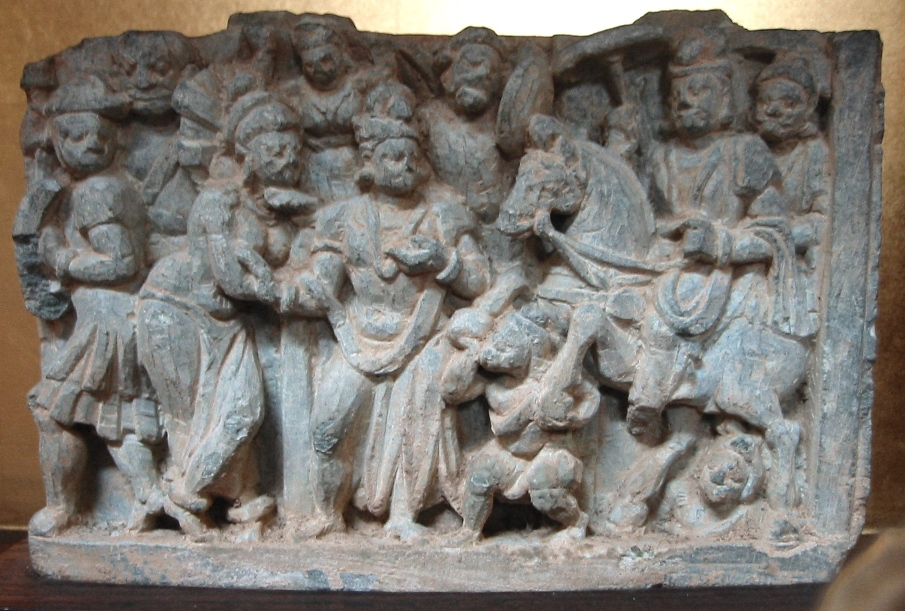
Siddhartha Gautama leaving the Palace

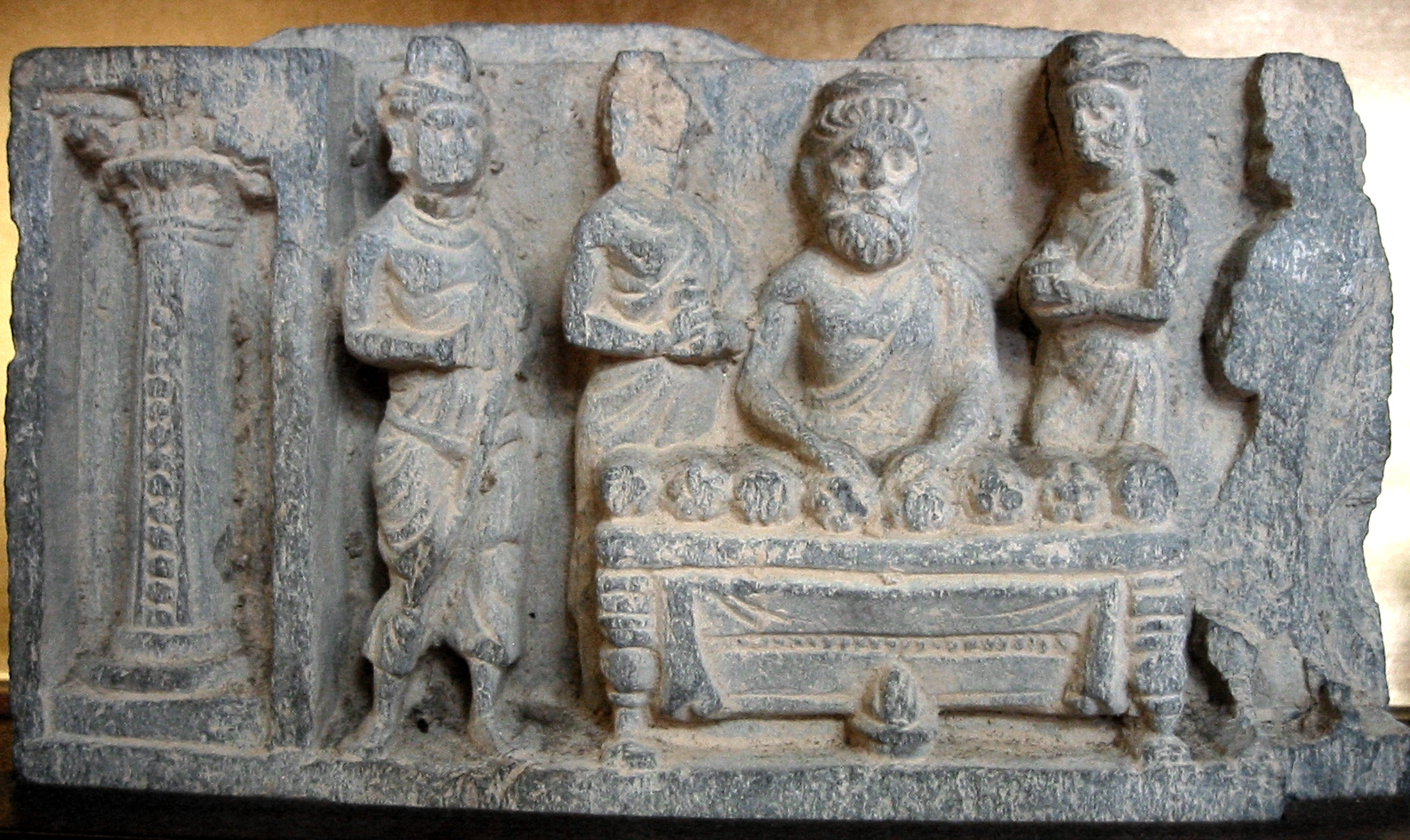
The end of ascetism

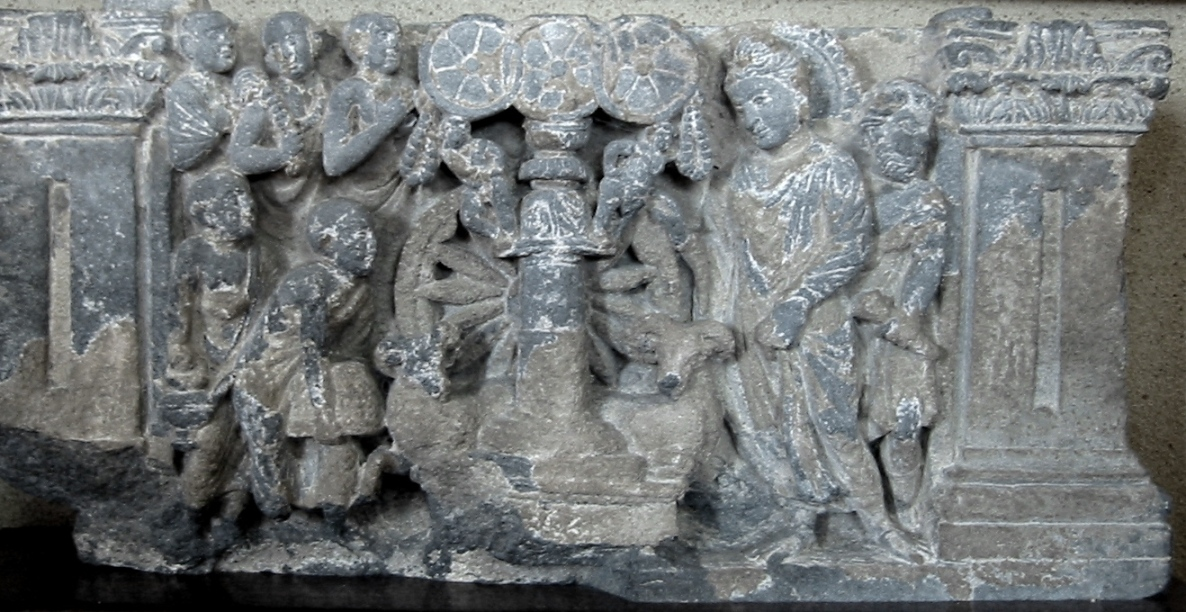
The Buddha at Sarnath

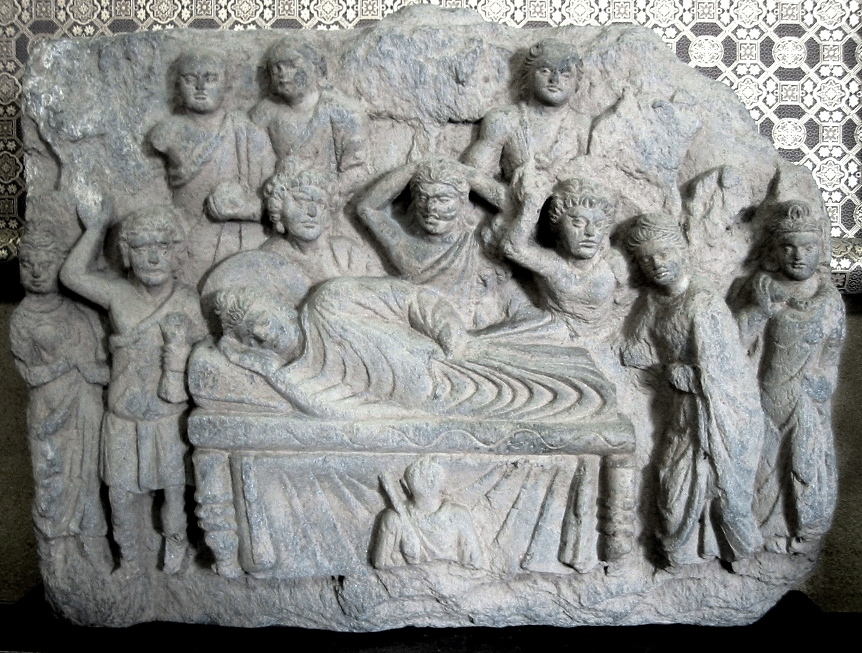
The Paranirvana of the Buddha

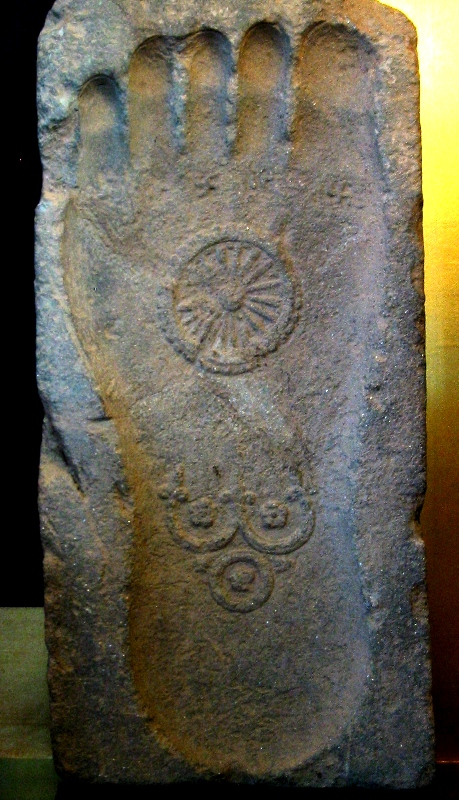
A Buddha footprint

== See also ==
- Gautama Buddha
