= Allakappa =

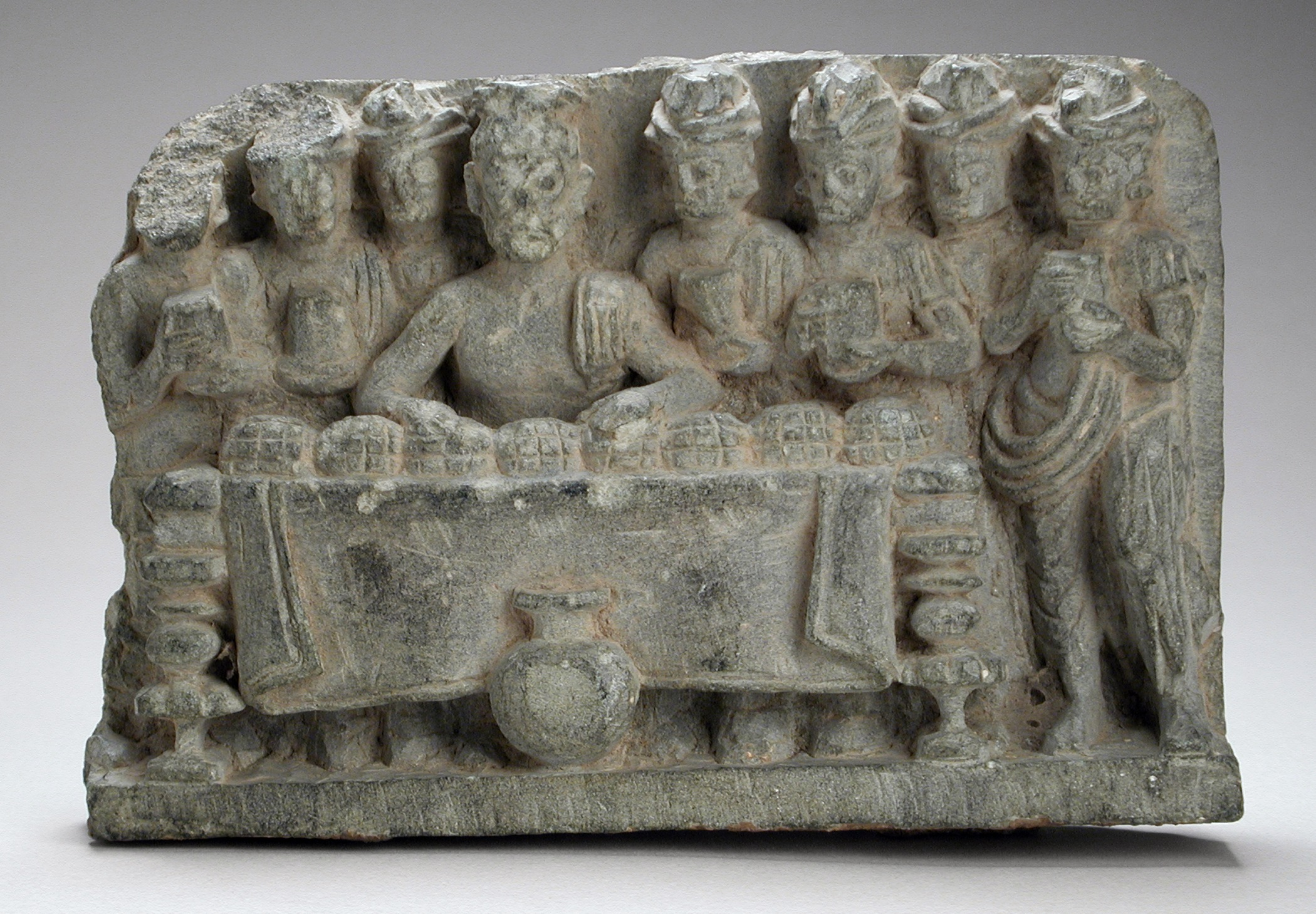
The Distribution of the Buddha's Relics, by Drona the Brahmin.

Allakappa was, in Buddhist tradition, one of the eight republics to whom were given the relics of the Buddha upon his death, or Parinirvana.

Initially, the relics had been kept exclusively by the Mallakas of Kusinagara, where the Buddha died, but following the War of the relics, the relics were spread between nine cities or Republics by Drona the Brahmin. The eight other Republics or cities were Rajagriha, Vaishali, Kapilavastu, Ramagrama, Pava, Kushinagar, Vethadipa and Pippalivan.

The people of Allakappa were called the Bulayas or Bulis. They were located somewhere in Bihar, in the historical area of the Buddha, but they are mentioned only in the Digha Nikaya.

Once received by the Bulis, the relics were stored inside a stupa.

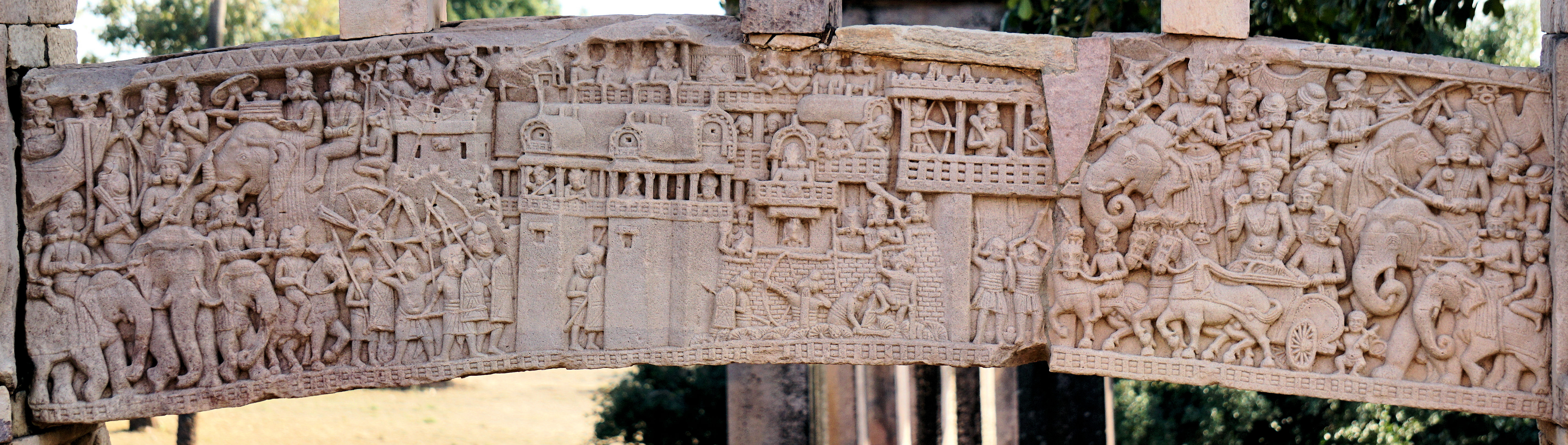
The Bulis of Allakappa received a portion of the Buddha's relics following the War over the Buddha's Relics against the Sakyas. Sanchi (1st century BCE/CE).

== See also ==
- Relics associated with Buddha
