= Kushwaha (surname) =

Kushwaha is a surname used by people of Koeri caste in the Indian states of Bihar and Uttar Pradesh. The Kushwahas are also known as Maurya, Shakya, or Saini in various parts of north India. As per one opinion, the Kushwaha surname is also common among members of Kachhi caste, who later merged with the Koeris to become a single homogeneous community. Koiri or Koeri comes under upper class of OBC under Government of India whose social hierarchy is higher than other backward classes.

== Notable people ==
Notable people using Kushwaha as their surname, middle name or first name, who may or may not be associated with caste/clan are:

- Abhay Kushwaha, Member of Parliament from Aurangabad, Floor Leader in Lok Sabha of Rashtriya Janata Dal
- Arun Singh Kushwaha, Member of Bihar Legislative Assembly from Karakat Assembly constituency, leader of Communist Party of India (Marxist-Leninist) Liberation.
- Ajab Singh Kushwah, Indian politician from Madhya Pradesh, a member of Indian National Congress
- Amarjeet Kushwaha, Indian activist, lawyer and Member of Bihar Legislative Assembly (a member of Communist Party of India (Marxist-Leninist) Liberation.)
- Ashok Kushwaha, two times member of Bihar Legislative Assembly from Sasaram Assembly constituency.
- Ajit Kushwaha, Indian Communist leader, Member of Bihar Legislative Assembly from Dumraon Assembly constituency.
- Ajay Kushwaha, Member of Bihar Legislative Assembly from Bibhutipur Assembly constituency.
- Ankit Kushwah, Indian cricketer from Madhya Pradesh
- Awadhesh Prasad Kushwaha, Indian politician from Bihar
- Babu Singh Kushwaha, Member of Parliament from Jaunpur, former Cabinet Minister of Uttar Pradesh, Deputy Floor Leader of Samajwadi Party in Lok Sabha
- Babu Lal Kushwaha, former member of Uttar Pradesh Legislative Assembly from Naraini Assembly constituency and Banda, Uttar Pradesh Assembly constituency.
- Basant Kushwaha, former Member of Bihar Legislative Assembly, leader of Rashtriya Lok Samata Party.
- Bhagvan Singh Kushwaha, Indian politician from UP
- Baij Nath Kushwaha, former member of Uttar Pradesh Legislative Assembly from Sirathu Assembly constituency.
- Bharat Singh Kushwah, cabinet minister in Government of Madhya Pradesh.
- Binod Singh Kushwaha, former Minister for Backward and Extremely Backward Caste welfare in Government of Bihar, leader of Bhartiya Janata Party.
- Bhagwandin Kushwaha, former member of Uttar Pradesh Legislative Assembly.
- Brahmdeo Narain Singh Kushwaha former legislator from Kalyanpur Assembly constituency, Bihar.
- Chandrapal Kushwaha, Indian politician from UP
- Dev Dyal Kushwaha, first agriculture minister for the state of Jharkhand, he served as a member of first Jharkhand cabinet under Babu Lal Marandi.
- Dinanath Kushwaha, former Member of Uttar Pradesh Legislative Assembly from Deoria Assembly constituency.
- Dinesh Prasad Kushwaha, former minister for irrigation in Government of Bihar.
- Fateh Bahadur Kushwaha, Businessman and Member of Bihar Legislative Assembly from Dehri Assembly constituency (2020–25)
- Ganga Singh Kushwaha, Indian politician from UP
- Hari Kewal Prasad Kushwaha, four-time Member of Indian Parliament (Lok Sabha) from Salempur Lok Sabha constituency.
- Hemlata Divakar Kushwaha, former Member of Uttar Pradesh Legislative Assembly from Agra Rural Assembly constituency
- Jagdeo Prasad Kushwaha, Indian politician from Bihar
- Jagdish Singh Kushwaha, Indian politician from UP
- Jayant Raj Kushwaha, former Minister for rural work department in Government of Bihar; Minister for minor water resources.
- Jawahar Prasad Kushwaha, former Member of Bihar Legislative Assembly from Sasaram Assembly constituency.
- Jagdish Prasad Kushwaha, Indian Ayurvedic practitioner and founding leader of Bharatiya Janata Party in Jharkhand.
- Janakdhari Prasad Kushwaha, former legislator from Minapur Assembly constituency.
- Kailash Kushwah, member of Madhya Pradesh Legislative Assembly.
- Rajeev Kumar Singh Kushwaha, Member of Bihar Legislative Assembly from Tarapur Assembly constituency.
- Kushwaha Ram Kumar Sharma, Member of Parliament from Sitamarhi constituency.
- Kunwar Yashwantsingh Kushwah, Indian politician from Madhya Pradesh
- Kushwaha Shashi Bhushan Mehta, Indian politician from Jharkhand
- Kushwaha Shivpujan Mehta, Indian politician from Jharkhand
- Manoj Singh Kushwaha, former Member of Bihar Legislative Assembly, a leader of Janata Dal (United).
- Mahabali Singh Kushwaha, Member of Indian Parliament from Karakat Lok Sabha constituency, Janata Dal (United) leader.
- Mihika Kushwaha, Indian model and actress.
- Maha Nand Singh Kushwaha, activist and Member of Legislative Assembly from Arwal Assembly constituency.
- Nagmani Kushwaha, Indian politician from Bihar and Jharkhand
- Nagendra Prasad Kushwaha, former legislator from Minapur Assembly constituency.
- Narayan Singh Kushwah, Indian politician, member of the Madhya Pradesh Legislative Assembly 2008–present
- Nathu Ram Kushwaha, former Member of Uttar Pradesh Legislative Assembly from Lalitpur Assembly constituency.
- Narendra Kumar Kushwaha, Indian politician from UP
- Narendra Singh Kushwah, member of Madhya Pradesh Legislative Assembly.
- Neeraj Kushawaha, Samajwadi Party, leader and MP from Aonla Lok Sabha constituency
- Pramod Kumar Sinha Kushwaha, Member of Bihar Legislative Assembly from Raxaul Assembly constituency.
- Ramesh Singh Kushwaha, Bihar state president of Rashtriya Lok Morcha
- Ramratan Kushwaha, Indian politician from UP
- Ravindra Kushawaha, Indian politician from UP
- Ram Naresh Kushwaha, former member of Indian parliament from Salempur Lok Sabha constituency.
- Ram Balak Singh Kushwaha, former Member of Bihar Legislative Assembly from Bibhutipur Assembly constituency.
- Ramsewak Singh Kushwaha, former Member of Bihar Legislative Assembly from Hathua Assembly constituency.
- Ram Asrey Singh Kushwaha, former Member of Uttar Pradesh Legislative Assembly from Sarsaul Assembly constituency.
- Ram Prakash Kushwaha, former Member of Uttar Pradesh Legislative Assembly from Ghatampur Assembly constituency.
- Ravindra Singh Kushwaha, naxal leader and former Member of Bihar Legislative Assembly from Arwal Assembly constituency.
- Raja Ram Singh Kushwaha, former legislator from Obra Assembly constituency, Bihar; politburo member of Communist Party of India (Marxist–Leninist) Liberation
- Ram Prasad Kushwaha, former member of Indian parliament from Arrah Lok Sabha constituency and Bikramganj Lok Sabha constituency.
- Rajesh Singh Kushwaha, Member of Bihar Legislative Assembly from Hathua Assembly constituency (2020–25).
- Dr. Rajesh Kushwaha; Former Member of Bihar Legislative Assembly from Kesaria Assembly constituency.
- Renu Kushawaha, Indian politician from Bihar
- R. S. Kushwaha, former Member of Uttar Pradesh Legislative Assembly (has been associated with Samajwadi Party and Bahujan Samaj Party).
- Saket Kushwaha, Indian educationist and agricultural economist(Vice Chancellor of Rajiv Gandhi University, Arunachal Pradesh)
- Santosh Kumar Kushwaha, Member Of Parliament from Purnea Bihar.
- Salona Kushwaha, member of Uttar Pradesh Legislative Assembly.
- Satyendra Narayan Kushwaha, former Member of Legislative Council, Bihar.
- Sita Sinha Kushwaha, former legislator from Kalyanpur Assembly constituency, Bihar.
- Satyadev Kushwaha, former member of Bihar Legislative Assembly, Janata Dal (United) leader.
- Suraj Nandan Kushwaha, former president of Rashtrawadi Kushwaha Parishad, an organisation affiliated to Bharatiya Janata Party.
- Sunil Kumar Kushwaha, Member of Parliament from Valmiki Nagar Lok Sabha constituency.
- Satish Prasad Singh Kushwaha, Former Chief Minister of Bihar
- Seema Samridhi Kushwaha, Supreme Court advocate, known for Nirbhaya gang rape case 2012.
- Shobha Rani Kushwaha, member of Rajasthan Legislative Assembly from Dholpur Assembly constituency.
- Sunil Kushwaha, former Member of Bihar Legislative Assembly from Sitamarhi Assembly constituency.
- Suman Devi Kushwaha, former Member of Uttar Pradesh Legislative Assembly from Lalitpur Assembly constituency.
- Sukhlal Kushwaha, former Member of Indian Parliament (Lok Sabha) from Satna Lok Sabha constituency, Madhya Pradesh.
- Siddharth Sukhlal Kushwaha, Member of Madhya Pradesh Legislative Assembly from Satna Assembly constituency.
- Shri Bhagwan Singh Kushwaha, National General Secretary of Janata Dal (United)
- Surendra Kumar Kushwaha, Bhartiya Janata Party politician from Fazilnagar Assembly constituency, Uttar Pradesh.
- Shivnath Singh Kushwaha, former Member of Uttar Pradesh Legislative Assembly from Ghatampur Assembly constituency, former minister in Government of Uttar Pradesh.
- Surendra Prasad Singh Kushwaha, former Member of Bihar Legislative Assembly from Amarpur Assembly constituency.
- Suresh Mehta Kushwaha, former member of Bihar Legislative Assembly from Aurangabad, Bihar Assembly constituency.
- Shiv Ram Kushwaha, former Member of Uttar Pradesh Legislative Assembly from Madhogarh Assembly constituency in Jalaun district.
- Sabhakunwar Kushawaha, Member of Uttar Pradesh Legislative Assembly from Bhatpar Rani Assembly constituency.
- Umesh Singh Kushwaha, Bihar state president of Janata Dal (United)
- Umashankar Kushwaha, former member of Uttar Pradesh Legislative Assembly from Ghazipur Sadar Assembly constituency
- Upendra Kushwaha, Indian politician from Bihar
- Vishal Kushwah (born 1990), Indian cricketer
- Vyas Deo Prasad Kushwaha, former minister in Government of Bihar, former Member of Bihar Legislative Assembly from Siwan Assembly constituency.
- Vijay Lakshmi Kushwaha, member of Indian Parliament, Lok Sabha from Siwan Lok Sabha constituency.

=== Bureaucrats ===
- Chandan Kushwaha, former city SP Patna, served as Superintendent of Police Rohtas and Banka, Commandant of Home Guards (Bihar).
- Pramod Kumar Kushwaha, Additional Commissioner of Delhi Police, served as Deputy Commissioner of Delhi Police's Special Cell.
- Roshan Kushwaha, Indian Administrative Service officer, District Magistrate of Begusarai.

== See also ==
- Mahto
