= Derapur Assembly constituency =

Constituency of the Madhya Pradesh legislative assembly

Derapur
- Former constituency No. 284 for the Uttar Pradesh Legislative Assembly

Constituency details
- Country: India
- Region: North India
- State: Uttar Pradesh
- District: Kanpur Dehat
- Lok Sabha constituency: Ghatampur
- Established: 1957
- Abolished: 2012
- Reservation: None

Derapur was a constituency of the Uttar Pradesh Legislative Assembly in Uttar Pradesh, India. It was in existence from 1957 to 2012. After the delimitation exercise, which resulted in dissolution of this constituency, it came to be known as Rasulabad and Sikandra Assembly constituency.

== Members of the Legislative Assembly ==
Election	Name	Party
1957	Shiva Ram	Indian National Congress
1962	Nityanand Pandey	Indian National Congress
1967	Nityanand Pandey	Indian National Congress
1969	Ram Pal Singh Yadav	Socialist Party
1974	Ram Pal Singh Yadav	Socialist Party
1977	Bhagwandin Kushwaha	Janata Party
1980	Bhagwandin Kushwaha	Janata Party
1985	Bhagwandin Kushwaha	Lok Dal
1989	Bhagwandin Kushwaha	Janata Dal
1991	Devendra Singh	Bharatiya Janata Party
1993	Ram Das Pal	Samajwadi Party
1996	Devendra Singh	Bharatiya Janata Party
2002	Kamlesh Kumar Pathak	Samajwadi Party
2007	Mahesh Chandra	Bahujan Samaj Party

== See also ==
- Kanpur Dehat district
- List of constituencies of the Uttar Pradesh Legislative Assembly
