= Kedar Prasad Gupta =

Indian politician

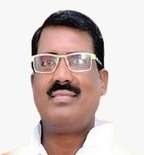

Minister of Tourism Government of Bihar
- Incumbent
- Assumed office 07 May 2026
- Chief Minister: Samrat Choudhary
- Preceded by: Samrat Choudhary(as Chief Minister)

Minister of Panchayat Raj Government of Bihar
- In office 15 March 2024 – 20 November 2025
- Chief Minister: Nitish Kumar
- Preceded by: Samrat Choudhary
- Succeeded by: Deepak Prakash

Member of Bihar Legislative Assembly
- Incumbent
- Assumed office 8 December 2022
- Preceded by: Anil Sahani
- Constituency: Kurhani
- In office 2015–2020
- Preceded by: Manoj Kushwaha
- Succeeded by: Anil Sahani
- Constituency: Kurhani

Personal details
- Born: 3 June 1963 (age 63) Muzaffarpur, Bihar
- Party: Bharatiya Janata Party
- Spouse: Vimla Gupta
- Children: 3 sons, 1 daughter
- Parent: Ramavtar Sah (father)
- Education: M. A. (Hindi)

Kedar Prasad Gupta (born 1964) is an Indian politician from Bharatiya Janata Party who is a former Minister of Panchayat Raj in the Government of Bihar. He won the Kurhani Assembly constituency of Bihar Legislative Assembly on 2025 with Bhartiya Janta Party (BJP) Symbol and he was also elected from same constituency 8 December 2022 in the by-election. He had earlier represented Kurhani in the Bihar Legislative Assembly from 2015-20. He is currently serving as the Minister of Tourism of Bihar.
