= Lalitpur Assembly constituency =

Legislative Assembly constituency in Uttar Pradesh State, India

Coordinates: 24.69°N 78.41°E

Lalitpur
- Constituency No. 226 for the Uttar Pradesh Legislative Assembly

Constituency details
- Country: India
- Region: North India
- State: Uttar Pradesh
- District: Lalitpur
- Lok Sabha constituency: Jhansi
- Total electors: 487,976
- Reservation: None

Member of Legislative Assembly
- 18th Uttar Pradesh Legislative Assembly
- Incumbent Ramratan Kushwaha
- Party: Bharatiya Janata Party
- Elected year: 2022

Lalitpur is one of the 403 assembly constituencies of Uttar Pradesh. It is a part of the Jhansi parliamentary constituency and comes under the Lalitpur district of Uttar Pradesh.

== Members of Legislative Assembly ==
Year	Member	Party
1952	Krishna Chandra Sharma	Indian National Congress
1957	Ram Nath Khera	Independent
1957	Gaijju Ram	Indian National Congress
1962	Ayodhya Prasad	Indian National Congress
1967	Ayodhya Prasad	Indian National Congress
1969	Bhagwat Dayal	Bharatiya Jana Sangh
1974	Chandan Singh	Communist Party of India
1977	Sudama Prasad Goswami	Janata Party
1980	Om Prakash Richhariya	Indian National Congress (I)
1985	Rajesh Kumar Khera	Indian National Congress
1989	Arvind Kumar Jain	Bharatiya Janata Party
1991	Arvind Kumar Jain	Bharatiya Janata Party
1993	Arvind Kumar Jain	Bharatiya Janata Party
1996	Arvind Kumar Jain	Bharatiya Janata Party
2002	Virendra Singh Bundela	Indian National Congress
2007	Nathu Ram Kushwaha	Bahujan Samaj Party
2009^	Suman Devi Kushwaha	Bahujan Samaj Party
2012	Ramesh Prasad Kushwaha	Bahujan Samaj Party
2017	Ramratan Kushwaha	Bharatiya Janata Party
2022	Ramratan Kushwaha	Bharatiya Janata Party

== Election results ==
=== 2027 ===
2027 Uttar Pradesh Legislative Assembly election: Lalitpur
Party	Candidate	Votes	%	±%
INDIA				
NDA				
BSP				
NOTA	None of the above			
Majority				
Turnout				
gain from		Swing		

=== 2022 ===
2022 Uttar Pradesh Legislative Assembly Election: Lalitpur
Party	Candidate	Votes	%	±%
BJP	Ramratan Kushwaha	176,550	52.99	+3.61
BSP	Chandra Bhusan Singh Bundela (Guddu Raja)	69,335	20.81	+3.33
SP	Ramesh Prasad	68,597	20.59	−7.31
Jan Adhikar Party	Vandana	4,475	1.34	+1.12
INC	Balwant Singh Rajpoot	3,920	1.18	
NOTA	None of the above	3,880	1.16	−0.39
Majority		107,215	32.18	+10.7
Turnout		333,155	68.27	−1.85
BJP hold		Swing		

=== 2017 ===
2022 Uttar Pradesh Legislative Assembly election: Lalitpur
Party	Candidate	Votes	%	±%
BJP	Ramratan Kushwaha	156,942	49.38	
SP	Jyoti Singh	88,687	27.9	
BSP	Chandra Bhushan Singh Bundela	55,549	17.48	
CPI	Parvat Lal Ahirwar	3,479	1.09	
NOTA	None of the above	4,859	1.55	
Majority		68,255	21.48	
Turnout		317,850	70.12	

=== 2012 ===
U. P. Assembly Elections, 2012: Lalitpur
Party	Candidate	Votes	%	±%
BSP	Ramesh Prasad Kushwaha	79,797	29.06	
SP	Chandra Bhushan Singh Bundela	68,474	24.94	
BJP	Ram Ratan	54,413	19.82	
INC	Virendra Singh Bundela	30,270	11.02	
Independent	Tilak Singh	11,538	4.20	
Majority		11,323	4.12	
Turnout		2,74,575	70.36	
BSP hold		Swing		
