= Ajay Kushwaha =

Indian politician

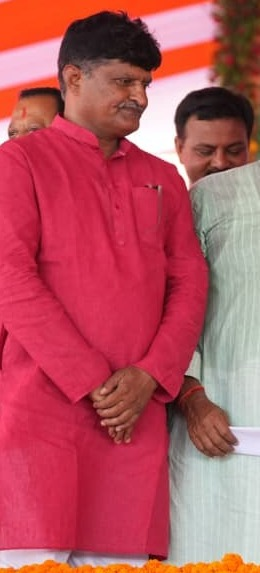

Member of Bihar Legislative Assembly
- Incumbent
- Assumed office 2025
- Preceded by: Munna Yadav
- Constituency: Minapur

Personal details
- Party: Janata Dal (United)
- Profession: Politician

Ajay Kumar also known as Ajay Kushwaha is a member of Bihar Legislative Assembly from Minapur Assembly constituency in Muzaffarpur district of Bihar. He won the Bihar Legislative Assembly election of 2025 from Minapur constituency by defeating Munna Yadav of Rashtriya Janata Dal.

== Life and career ==
He is the son of former legislator Dinesh Prasad Kushwaha, who represented Minapur Assembly constituency in Bihar Legislative Assembly for multiple times.
