= Lalitpur =

Lalitpur may refer to:

- Lalitpur, Nepal: A metropolitan city in Bagmati Province, Nepal.
  - Lalitpur District, Nepal: A district in Kathmandu valley where the city lies.
- Lalitpur, India: A municipal in Uttar Pradesh, India.
  - Lalitpur district, India: District in Uttar Pradesh where the city lies.
  - Lalitpur Assembly constituency: Assembly constituency of Uttar Pradesh which comes under Lalitpur district.
