= Fazilnagar =

Pawangarh
- Town
- Location in Uttar Pradesh, India
- Coordinates: 26.7584°N 83.8765°E
- Country: India
- State: Uttar Pradesh
- District: Kushinagar District

Government
  - MLA: Surendra Kumar Kushwaha

Population
  - Total: N/A
- Postal code: 274401
- Website: kushinagar.nic.in

Pawangarh (Formally known as Fazilnagar) is a town and a community development block in the Kushinagar district of the state of Uttar Pradesh in India. It is located along NH 28, about 20 kilometres (12 mi) southeast of Kushinagar International Airport. It is 55 kilometres (34 mi) from Deoria and 70 kilometres (43 mi) east of Gorakhpur Airport.

== History ==
At the time of the Haryanka dynasty of Magadha, it was known as Pāvā As such, it was the capital city of one of the two Malla republics of ancient India (the capital of the other Malla republic was located at Kushinagar).

According to the Mahāparinibbāṇa Sutta (Sutta 16 of the Dīgha Nikāya), Gautama Buddha visited this place during his final journey, as he traveled from Kesaputta (the capital of the Kālāma tribe) to Kushinagar. According to Buddhist texts, It was here, at Cunda's mango grove, where the Buddha ate his last meal.

== Language ==
Bhojpuri is the local language of the region.

== Location ==
NH 27 passes through Pawangarh. It serves as a central market for the surrounding villages.

== Geography ==
Pawangarh is located along National Highway 27 and is around 20 km from the Kushinagar International Airport. The town is well-connected by road and serves as a local market for nearby villages.

== Economy ==
The town functions as a center for local trade and commerce. Agriculture is the primary occupation for the nearby villages.

== Politics ==
Pawangarh is part of the Fazilnagar Assembly constituency. In the 2022 elections, Surendra Kumar Kushwaha of the Bharatiya Janata Party was elected as the representative.

== Transportation ==
Pawangarh is accessible via NH 27, making it well-connected to major nearby cities like Deoria and Gorakhpur.
