= Fazilnagar Assembly constituency =

Constituency of the Uttar Pradesh legislative assembly in India

Coordinates: 26.68°N 84.05°E

Fazilnagar
- Constituency No. 332 for the Uttar Pradesh Legislative Assembly

Constituency details
- Country: India
- Region: North India
- State: Uttar Pradesh
- District: Kushinagar
- Total electors: 4,00,053
- Reservation: None

Member of Legislative Assembly
- 18th Uttar Pradesh Legislative Assembly
- Incumbent Surendra Kumar Kushwaha
- Party: Bharatiya Janta Party
- Elected year: 2022

Fazilnagar is a constituency of the Uttar Pradesh Legislative Assembly covering the city of Fazilnagar in the Kushinagar district of Uttar Pradesh, India.

Fazilnagar is one of five assembly constituencies in the Deoria Lok Sabha constituency. Since 2008, this assembly constituency is numbered 332 amongst 403 constituencies.

== Members of Legislative Assembly ==
Year	Member	Party
1967	Ramayan Rai	Indian National Congress
1969	Ramdhari Shastri	Samyukta Socialist Party
1974	Ramayan Rai	Indian National Congress
1977	Ramesh Naresh Pandey	Janata Party
1980	Khudadin Ansari	Indian National Congress (I)
1985	Shashi Sharma	Indian National Congress
1989	Vishwanath	Janata Dal
1991	Vishwanath	Janata Dal
1993	Vishwanath	Janata Dal
1996	Vishwanath	Samajwadi Party
2002	Jagdish Mishra	Bharatiya Janata Party
2007	Vishwanath	Samajwadi Party
2012	Ganga Kushwaha	Bharatiya Janata Party
2017	Ganga Kushwaha	Bharatiya Janata Party
2022	Surendra Kushwaha	Bharatiya Janata Party

== Election results ==
=== 2027 ===
2027 Uttar Pradesh Legislative Assembly election: Fazilnagar
Party	Candidate	Votes	%	±%
INDIA				
NDA				
BSP				
NOTA	None of the above			
Majority				
Turnout				
gain from		Swing		

=== 1989 ===
2022 Uttar Pradesh Legislative Assembly election: Fazilnagar
Party	Candidate	Votes	%	±%
BJP	Surendra Kumar Kushwaha	116,029	51.61	+3.67
SP	Swami Prasad Maurya	71,015	31.59	+3.21
BSP	Iiliyas	28,237	12.56	−3.41
INC	Sunil Singh Manoj	2,323	1.03	
NOTA	None of the above	1,511	0.67	−0.66
Majority		45,014	20.02	+0.46
Turnout		224,836	56.2	+0.21
BJP hold		Swing		

=== 2017 ===
Bharatiya Janta Party candidate Ganga Singh Kushwaha won in last Assembly election of 2017 Uttar Pradesh Legislative Elections, defeating Samajwadi Party candidate Vishwanath by a margin of 41,922 votes.

2017 Uttar Pradesh Legislative Assembly election: Fazilnagar
Party	Candidate	Votes	%	±%
BJP	Ganga	102,778	47.94	
SP	Vishwnath	60,856	28.38	
BSP	Jagdish Singh	34,250	15.97	
CPI	Mohan	2,581	1.2	
PECP	Azimullah Alias Guddu	2,210	1.03	
Independent	Sunil Alias Manoj Singh	1,966	0.92	
NOTA	None of the above	2,811	1.33	
Majority		41,922	19.56	
Turnout		214,409	55.99	
