= Patherwa =

- Village
- Location in Uttar Pradesh, India
- Coordinates: 26.689°N 84.108°E
- Country: India
- State: Uttar Pradesh
- District: Kushinagar

Languages
  - Official: Hindi and Urdu
- Time zone: UTC+5:30 (IST)
- PIN: 274401
- Vehicle registration: UP-57

Patherwa is a village in Kushinagar district, previously Deoria district, Uttar Pradesh, India. Situated along National Highway 28, it lies approximately 4 kilometers from Fazilnagar. Historically part of the Deoria district, Patherwa was incorporated into the newly formed Kushinagar district in 1994. The village is approximately 80 kilometers from the city of Gorakhpur and 25 kilometers east of the internationally renowned Buddhist pilgrimage site of Kushinagar, where Lord Buddha is believed to have attained Mahaparinirvana.

== Historical significance ==
The region was historically part of various kingdoms and empires, including the Mauryan, Gupta, and Mughal empires, each leaving their mark on the cultural landscape. The Muslim community of Patherwa likely has roots dating back several centuries.
