= Munna Yadav =

Indian politician

Rajeev Kumar

Member of Bihar Legislative Assembly
- In office 2015–2025
- Preceded by: Dinesh Prasad
- Succeeded by: Ajay Kushwaha
- Constituency: Minapur

Personal details
- Born: 1 January 1967 (age 59) Dumarwanna, Muzaffarpur, India
- Party: Rashtriya Janata Dal
- Education: Intermediate
- Profession: Politician

Rajeev Kumar Urf Munna Yadav (born 1 January 1967) is an Indian politician. He was elected to the Bihar Legislative Assembly from Minapur as the 2015 Member of Bihar Legislative Assembly as a member of the Rashtriya Janata Dal. He defeated BJP candidate Ajay Kumar with huge margin in Bihar Assembly Election, 2015.
