= Nagendra Prasad Singh =

Indian politician

Nagendra Prasad Singh better known as Nagendra Prasad Kushwaha was an Indian politician, who was elected to Bihar Legislative Assembly from Minapur Assembly constituency in 1977 Assembly elections. He was a leader of Janata Party and in 1977, he defeated Janakdhari Prasad Kushwaha, an independent candidate, to become the legislator.
