= Rai Laxmi Narayan Singh =

Indian politician

Rai Laxmi Narain Singh

MLA In 9th Legislative Assembly of Uttar Pradesh
- Constituency: Garwara Assembly Constituency

Personal details
- Born: Sarai Padari Jaunpur
- Party: Indian National Congress
- Other political affiliations: Lok Dal Janata Party (Secular) Janata Dal
- Relations: Durgvanshi Rajput Clan
- Parent: Rai Ambika Singh

Rai Laxmi Narayan Singh is an Indian politician. He was the member of the Uttar Pradesh legislative assembly from Garwara Assembly Constituency Jaunpur District.

== See also ==
- Uttar Pradesh Assembly Constituency
