= Basawan Prasad Bhagat =

Former cabinet member in Bihar government

Minister for Prison Affairs, Government of Bihar
- In office 2000–2005

Member of the Bihar Legislative Assembly
- In office 1995–2000
- Constituency: Kurhani Assembly constituency
- In office 2000–2005
- Constituency: Kurhani Assembly constituency

Personal details
- Party: Rashtriya Janata Dal
- Other political affiliations: Bharatiya Janata Party
- Spouse: Lalita Devi Kushwaha

Basawan Prasad Bhagat is an Indian politician based in Bihar, who was elected to Bihar Legislative Assembly twice from Kurhani Assembly constituency of the Muzaffarpur district of Bihar. Bhagat also served as minister in Government of Bihar under Lalu Prasad Yadav twice. He was allotted Ministry of Prison Affairs and Ministry of Law. He joined Bharatiya Janata Party in 2017 in the presence of Uttar Pradesh Deputy Chief Minister, Keshav Prasad Maurya.

== Life and career ==
Bhagat is a member of Kushwaha (Koeri) caste of Bihar. (Note: He said that the Kushwaha community needs to unite. We will get proper participation in politics only by showing unity. The former minister said that we have to become politically powerful, so that the representatives of our society can win and go to the Lok Sabha and Assembly, who can raise our voice.) He entered politics through Lalu Prasad Yadav's Janata Dal (later Rashtriya Janata Dal). He represented Kurhani Assembly constituency of Muzaffarpur district, which is a constituency having preponderance of voters from Koeri, Bhumihar and Mallaah caste. He first entered in Assembly elections in 1995, on the symbol of Rashtriya Janata Dal. In this election, the main contender in front of him was local muscleman Ashok Samrat, who hailed from Bhumihar community. Bhagat defeated Samrat and entered Bihar Legislative Assembly for the first time in this election. In 2000, the National Democratic Alliance, which was the main front in opposition against ruling Rashtriya Janata Dal of Lalu Prasad Yadav, nominated Brajesh Thakur, who was later convicted in Muzaffarpur shelter case, as their candidate for 2000 Bihar Legislative Assembly election against Bhagat. Bhagat was successful in securing victory for the second time and was elected to Legislative Assembly once again. Thakur was a candidate of Bihar People's Party of Anand Mohan Singh.

After his victory in 2000 Bihar Legislative Assembly elections, Bhagat was given the portfolio of Ministry of Prison Affairs. In 2002, he was issued a notice by Patna High Court, in connection with transfer and later suspension of jail superintendent of Muzaffarpur prison, Shyam Mohan Mishra. This was done on the appeal of Mishra, who alleged that Bhagat caused his transfer to place his relative Lakshman Bhagat as the new jail superintendent in his place. Bhagat was known for his strict actions as a minister during his tenure. In 2004, during his tenure as Minister of Prison Affairs, jailer of Beur jail was shot dead by unknown assailants. Bhagat was quick to allege Inspector General of Prison, Ravikant being responsible behind the death of jailer. He stated in his media briefing that deceased jailer had sent Inspector General a file, recommending transfer of some of the prison inmates from the Beur jail, but no action was taken by latter. He also said that he himself demanded the file to be sent to him to examine the issue, but it was not sent on time and consequently the murder of jailer took place. It was also reported that jail officials in Beur jail were consistently threatened through phone calls by the accomplice of criminals, against which, higher officials had failed to take any action. It was also suspected that the jailer was killed by members of People's War group, as he had a scuffle with some of the members of the group imprisoned in Beur Jail. Bhagat ordered departmental inquiry in this case declaring the jailer to be an upright officer.

In 2002, a police firing took place in Chhapra prison to break the prison siege conducted by five criminals lodged in the jail. It was reported that there was a brawl between two groups in the prison over supremacy and the jail administration had decided to transfer the members of two groups, which included a total of five inmates to different jails. However, these inmates threatened other prisoners that if they didn't support them in conducting the siege to prevent their transfer, they will have to face dire consequences. The prisoners hence pelted stone at jail staffs when they arrived to transfer them to other jails. In return police opened fire at the miscreants. In reply to a question on this incident in Bihar Legislative Assembly, prison affairs minister Basawan Bhagat supported the firing incident and justified the action of the police. He also said that it was necessary to break the siege as the prisoners had become unruly. Bhagat also stated that Saran District Magistrate had informed the government about the proposed transfer and they nodded it to be implemented.

During his tenure as minister, transfer of senior jail officials was also a regular feature. In one such reshuffle, in 2002, seven jail superintendent were transferred. Conflicts between minister and Inspector General of prison was also observed occasionally. One such incident was keeping the file containing order, quashing the suspension of Buxar jail superintendent D.N Tiwari, pending by Bhagat.

== Other activities ==
Bhagat is also involved in socio-cultural activities and is associated with Akhil Bhartiya Kushwaha Mahasabha (All India Kushwaha Conference). In 2022, at a conference organised by this caste body in Vaishali district of Bihar, Bhagat admitted that during his elections in 1990s, he had beaten the supporters of his political opponent Ashok Samrat brutally with rod and lathis. He also admitted that during his tenure as minister, the District Magistrates and Superintendent of Police could not argue with ministers and their party workers. They had to take orders and complete it. He also took credit for eliminating the criminal elements from Vaishali and Muzaffarpur during his tenure.
