= Pāvā =

Historical city in Uttar Pradesh, India

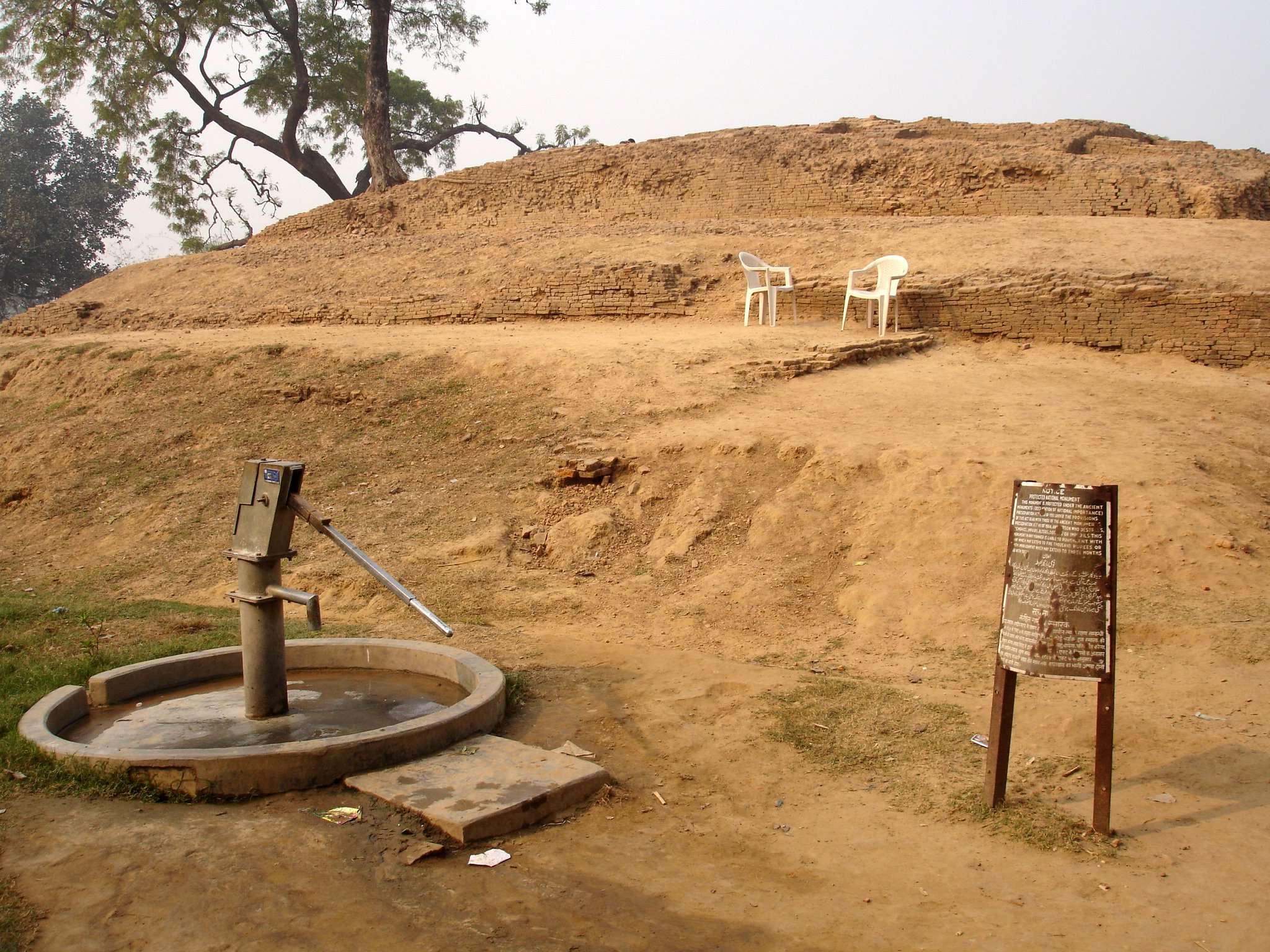
A stupa built at the place where Cunda's house used to be, in ancient Pava (present-day Fazilnagar)

Pāvā was an important city of the Malla tribe of ancient India at the time of the Haryanka dynasty of Magadha. It is located about 20 kilometres (12 mi) southeast of Kushinagar in the state of Uttar Pradesh, India.

== Possible locations ==
The precise location of ancient Pāvā is not known with certainty. Likely candidates include:

- an ancient site known as Fazilnagar ka kot (ASI SL.# N-UP-P25), located in present-day Fazilnagar, in Kushinagar district
- a large flat-topped mound of ruins known as Jharmatiya (ASI SL.# N-UP-P21), located in present-day Chetiaon, in Kushinagar district

== Buddhist history ==
When the Buddha reached his eightieth year, he felt that his time in this world was approaching an end. At that time, according to the Mahāparinibbāṇa Sutta (Sutta 16 of the Dīgha Nikāya), he and some of his disciples undertook a months-long journey that would take them from Rājagṛha, through Pāṭaliputta, Vesāli, Bhoganagara, and Pāvā, to their final destination at Kuśinagara. It was at Pāvā that Cunda, a resident of Pāvā, invited the group to a meal that featured a food called sukaramaddava. This would prove to be the Buddha's last meal, as he was afflicted by a painful illness resembling dysentery soon after consuming the meal. It was on this occasion that the Cunda Sutta (AN 6:46) was preached. At that time, the Mallas had just completed their new meeting hall. Upon their invitation, the Buddha consecrated it by first occupying it and then preaching in it. After the Buddha had finished speaking, one of his leading disciples, Śāriputra, recited the Saṅgīti Sutta (DN 33) to the assembled monks. After the meal, the Buddha crossed the Kakkuttha River (now called the Khanua River) and completed his journey to Kushinagar. Soon after his arrival in Kushinagar, the Buddha attained parinirvana. After the Buddha's cremation, the Mallas of Pāvā claimed a share in his relics. A Brahmin named Drona satisfied their claim, and a stupa was erected in Pāvā over their share of the relics.

== Jain history ==
Besides being a center of Buddhists, Pāvā was also a center of Jainism. The Pasādika Sutta (DN 29) records the Buddha at Pāvā at the time the leader of the Jains attained parinirvana: "Once the Lord was staying among the Sakyans (at Pāvā) ... in the mango-grove belonging to the Vedhanna family (the Samagama). At that time the Nigantha Nātaputta (or Mahāvīra, the leader of the Jains) had just died ... And at his death the Niganthas (Jains) were split into two parties ...".

== See also ==
- List of Monuments of National Importance in Patna circle, Uttar Pradesh
- Pawapuri
