= Kurhani Assembly constituency =

Constituency of the Bihar legislative assembly in India

- Constituency No. 93 for the Bihar Legislative Assembly

Constituency details
- Country: India
- Region: East India
- State: Bihar
- District: Muzaffarpur
- Lok Sabha constituency: 15. Muzaffarpur
- Established: 1951
- Total electors: 306,238

Member of Legislative Assembly
- 18th Bihar Legislative Assembly
- Incumbent Kedar Prasad Gupta
- Party: BJP
- Alliance: NDA
- Elected year: 2025

Kurhani Assembly constituency is an assembly constituency in Muzaffarpur district in the Indian state of Bihar.

== Overview ==
As per Delimitation of Parliamentary and Assembly constituencies Order, 2008, No. 93 Kurhani Assembly constituency is composed of the following: Kurhani community development block.

Kurhani Assembly constituency is part of No. 15 Muzaffarpur (Lok Sabha constituency).

== Members of the Legislative Assembly ==
Year	Name	Party
1952	Kapil Deo Narayan Singh	Indian National Congress
1962	Ramgulam Choudhary	Indian National Congress
1967	Krishna Nandan Sahay	Indian National Congress
1969	Sadhu Sharan Shahi	Praja Socialist Party
1972	Sadhu Sharan Shahi	Samyukta Socialist Party
1977	Sadhu Sharan Shahi	Janata Party
1980	Ram Parikshan Sah	Janata Party (Secular)
1985	Shivnandan Rai	Indian National Congress
1990	Sadhu Sharan Shahi	Independent politician
1991^	R. P. Sahu	Janata Dal
1995	Basawan Prasad Bhagat	Janata Dal
2000	Basawan Prasad Bhagat	Rashtriya Janata Dal
2005	Manoj Singh Kushwaha	Janata Dal (United)
2005	Manoj Singh Kushwaha	Janata Dal (United)
2010	Manoj Singh Kushwaha	Janata Dal (United)
2015	Kedar Prasad Gupta	Bharatiya Janata Party
2020	Anil Sahani	Rashtriya Janata Dal
2022^	Kedar Prasad Gupta	Bharatiya Janata Party
2025	Kedar Prasad Gupta	Bharatiya Janata Party

^by-election

== Election results ==
=== 2025 ===
Bihar Assembly election, 2025: Kurhani
Party	Candidate	Votes	%	±%
BJP	Kedar Prasad Gupta	107,811	46.49	▲6.63
RJD	Sunil Kumar Suman	98,093	42.3	▲2.07
Independent	Dharmendra Kumar	6,733	2.9	
JSP	Mohammad Ali Irfan	4,075	1.76	
Independent	Manish Kumar	3,368	1.45	
BSP	Vijayesh Kumar	2,117	0.91	
NOTA	None of the above	729	0.31	▼0.27
Majority		9,718	4.19	▲3.82
Turnout		231,884	75.72	▲11.54
BJP gain from		Swing	NDA	

=== 2022 bypoll ===
Bihar Assembly by election, 2022
Party	Candidate	Votes	%	±%
BJP	Kedar Prasad Gupta	76,722	42.38	+2.25
JD(U)	Manoj Singh Kushwaha	73,073	40.37	New
VIP	Nilabh Kumar	10,000	5.53	New
NOTA	None of the above			
Majority		3,649	2.01	
Turnout		1,81,024	58.07	
BJP gain from RJD		Swing	2.01	

=== 2020 ===
Bihar Assembly election, 2020: Kurhani
Party	Candidate	Votes	%	±%
RJD	Anil Kumar Sahni	78,549	40.23	
BJP	Kedar Prasad Gupta	77,837	39.86	▼2.47
RLSP	Ram Babu Singh	10,041	5.14	
Independent	Sanjay Kumar	4,802	2.46	
Bajjikanchal Vikas Party	Harindra Choudhary	4,355	2.23	
Voters Party International	Sukhdeo Prasad	3,636	1.86	
Independent	Deepak Kumar Chanchal	3,154	1.62	
JAP(L)	Mukesh Kumar Sharma	2,785	1.43	▲0.63
Independent	Ashok Kumar Gupta	2,425	1.24	
NOTA	None of the above	1,141	0.58	▼0.41
Majority		712	0.37	▼6.32
Turnout		195,257	64.18	▼0.94
RJD gain from BJP		Swing		

=== 2015 ===
In the 2015 state assembly election, Kedar Prasad Gupta of BJP defeated Manoj Kumar Singh of JDU. In the 2010, October 2005 and February 2005 state assembly elections, Manoj Singh Kushwaha of JDU won the Kurhani assembly seat defeating his nearest rivals Bijendra Chaudhary of LJP, Ajay Nishad of RJD and Basawan Bhagat Kushwaha of RJD respectively. Contests in most years were multi cornered but only winners and runners up are being mentioned. Basawan Bhagat Kushwaha of RJD defeated Brajesh Kumar of BPSP in 2000. Basawan Bhagat Kushwaha of JD defeated Ashok Sharma, Independent, in 1995. Sadhu Sharan Shahi, Independent, defeated Sheonandan Rai of Congress in 1990. Sheonandan Rai of Congress defeated Sadhu Sharan Shahi of JP in 1985. Ram Praikshan Sah of Janata Party (Secular – Charan Singh) defeated Sadhu Sharan Shahi of Janata Party (JP) in 1980. Sadhu Sharan Shahi of JP defeated Hind Keshri Yadav of Congress in 1977.

2015 Bihar Legislative Assembly election: Kurhani
Party	Candidate	Votes	%	±%
BJP	Kedar Prasad Gupta	73,227	42.33	
JD(U)	Manoj Kumar Singh	61,657	35.64	
SP	Mrityunjay Kumar	4,705	2.72	
CPI(M)	Abdul Gaffar	4,487	2.59	
Marxist Communist Party of India	Pramod Kumar	2,233	1.29	
Swabhiman Party	Bimaleshwar Prasad	1,977	1.14	
BMP	Ramneresh Yadav	1,964	1.14	
NOTA	None of the above	1,706	0.99	
Majority		11,570	6.69	
Turnout		173,007	65.12	
