= Ganga Singh Kushwaha =

Indian politician

MLA in Legislative Assembly of Uttar Pradesh
- In office March 2012 – March 2022
- Preceded by: Vishwanath
- Succeeded by: Surendra Kumar Kushwaha
- Constituency: Fazilnagar (Assembly constituency)

Personal details
- Born: 7 January 1936 (age 90) Narayanpur Kothi, Kushinagar, Uttar Pradesh
- Party: Bhartiya Janata Party
- Education: M.A.; B.Ed.
- Alma mater: Gorakhpur University
- Occupation: MLA
- Profession: Politician

Ganga Singh Kushwaha is an Indian politician and a member of 16th and 17th Legislative Assembly of Kushinagar, Uttar Pradesh of India. He represents the Fazilnagar constituency of Uttar Pradesh and is a member of the Bharatiya Janata Party.

== Early life and education ==
Kushwaha was born (7 January 1936) in Narayanpur Kothi, Kushinagar to his father Late Kali Charan Singh. He married Smt. Phoolmati Devi. He had Post Graduate in MA, B-Ed from Deen Dayal Upadhyay Gorakhpur University in 1959.

== Political career ==
Kushwaha was two time MLA from Fazil Nagar as a member of Bhartiya Janata Party. In 2012 (16th Legislative Assembly of Uttar Pradesh), elections he defeated his nearest rival Kalamuddin candidate of Bahujan Samaj Party by a margin of 5,494 votes.

In 2017 (17th Legislative Assembly of Uttar Pradesh), elections he defeated Samajwadi Party candidate Vishwanath by a margin of 41,922 votes.

== Posts held ==
#	From	To	Position	Comments
01	March 2012	March 2017	Member, 16th Legislative Assembly of Uttar Pradesh	
02	March 2017	March 2022	Member, 17th Legislative Assembly of Uttar Pradesh	
