= Khudadin Ansari =

Indian politician

- ख़ुदादिन अंसारी

Member of the Uttar Pradesh Legislative Assembly
- In office June 1980 – Mar 1985

Personal details
- Party: Indian National Congress

Khudadin Ansari was an Indian politician and member of the 08th Legislative Assembly of Uttar Pradesh from Fazilnagar Assembly constituency as a member of Indian National Congress (Indira) party from June 1980 to Mar 1985.
