= Nathu Ram Kushwaha =

Indian politician

Member of Uttar Pradesh Legislative Assembly
- In office 2007–2009
- Constituency: Lalitpur Assembly constituency

Personal details
- Born: 1 January 1947 Uttar Pradesh
- Party: Bahujan Samaj Party
- Spouse: Suman Devi Kushwaha

Nathu Ram Kushwaha was an Indian politician based in Uttar Pradesh, who served as member of Uttar Pradesh Legislative Assembly in the 15th Uttar Pradesh Assembly. He was a member of Bahujan Samaj Party and was elected to Uttar Pradesh Legislature via 2007 Assembly elections. Kushwaha was an engineer, prior to becoming a politician and he was popularly known as Engineer Nathu Ram Kushwaha in political circles.

== Life and political career ==
Nathu Ram Kushwaha was born to Shri Hari Kishan on 1 January 1947, in Narayanpur (Jalaun) village of Lalitpur district of Indian state of Uttar Pradesh. As per his election affidavit submitted to Election Commission of India, he was a member of Kachhi caste of the broader Kushwaha community. He took diploma in civil engineering and married Suman Kushwaha on 5 May 1972. They had two sons and a daughter from the marriage.

He contested the 2007 Assembly elections to Uttar Pradesh Legislative Assembly on the symbol of Bahujan Samaj Party. In this election, he got 42.48 percent of votes polled and defeated his nearest political rival Virendra Singh Bundela. Kushwaha secured 78,010 votes. Between 2008 and 2009, he served as a member of Committee on Rules of the Uttar Pradesh Legislative Assembly.

He died prematurely on 21 July 2009 and consequently his seat in Assembly became vacant. A bypoll was concluded after his death and Suman Devi Kushwaha emerged victorious in these polls to become the new Member of Legislative Assembly from the Lalitpur constituency.
