= Anil Kumar Sahani =

Indian politician

Dr. Anil Kumar Sahani
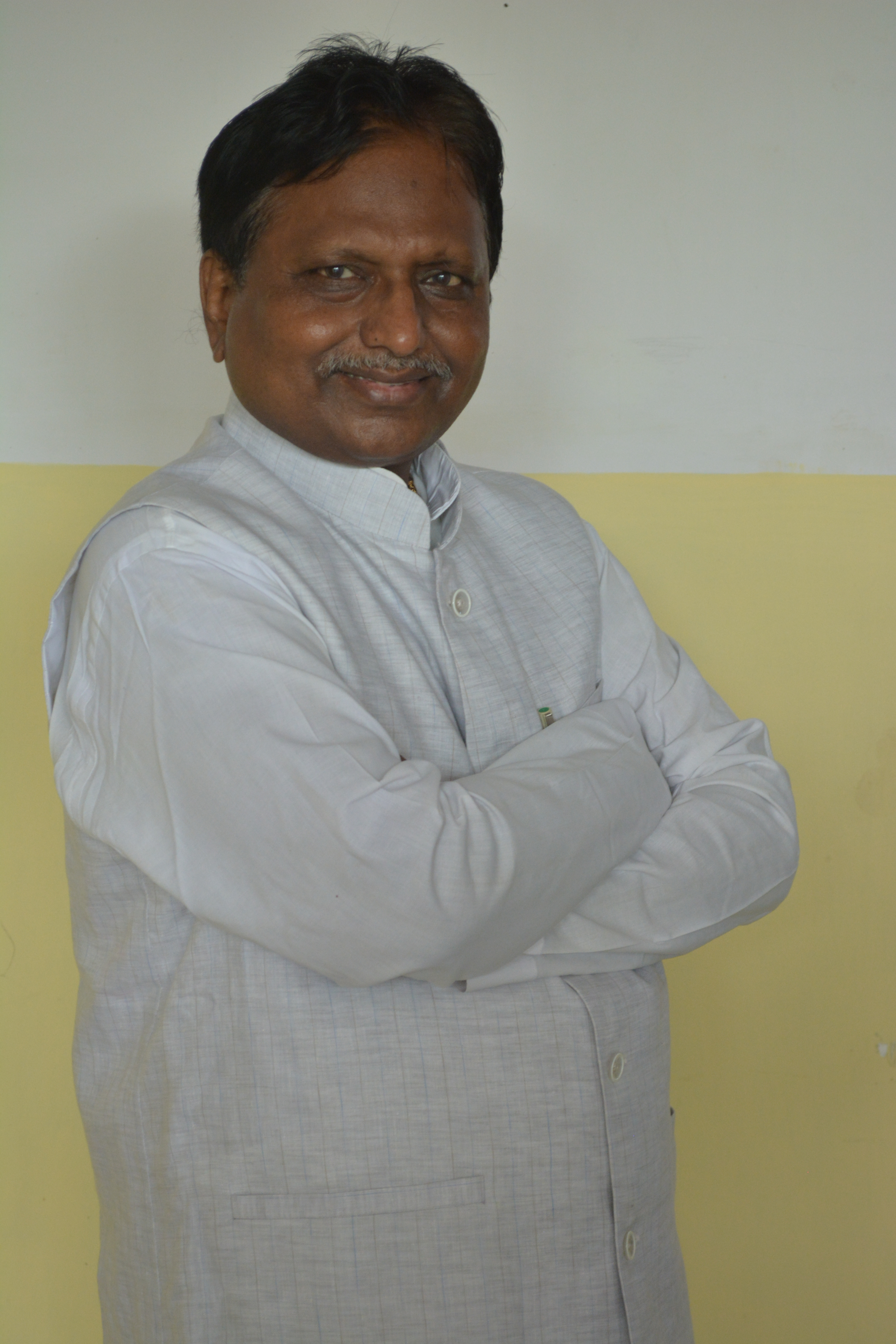

MP of Rajya Sabha for Bihar
- In office 3 April 2012 – 2 April 2018
- Succeeded by: Ashfaq Karim, RJD

Personal details
- Political party: JD(U)

Anil Kumar Sahani (born 4 July 1963) is an Indian politician and social worker who belongs to Bihar.

He is serving as the MLA for the Kurhani Assembly constituency from the Rashtriya Janata Dal party. He was a Member of the Parliament of India representing Bihar in the Rajya Sabha from 2010–18, starting from a by-election in 2010 and then going on to a full term service in 2012.

He was elected by the people of Bihar in April 2012.

He is currently facing an imminent expulsion from the Rajya Sabha as it was recommended by the Ethics Committee due to irregularities in filing Leave Travel Allowance. and was recently awarded three years in prison for fraudulent withdrawal of money as then JD(U) Rajya Sabha member (2010–12 and 2012–18) against LTC claims on forged bills, was disqualified from the state legislative assembly.

== Personal life ==
Anil Kumar Sahani was born in the year 1963 in Shahid Jubba Sahni Nagar, Brahmapura in Muzaffarpur district of Indian state Bihar.

Sahani's father's name is Late Shri Mahendra Sahani who was a M.P. and Ex. M.L.C. his mother's name is Shrimati Susheela Devi. Sahani's brother's name is Sunil Kumar Sahani.

== Positions ==
- Jan. 2010 - Elected as member to Rajya Sabha
- Feb. 2010 to May 2014 - Member, Committee on Chemical and Fertilizers
- Member, Committee on Energy
- July 2010 to May 2014 - Member, Consultative Committee for the Ministry of Commerce and Industry
- Dec. 2011 to April 2012 - Member, Parliamentary Forum on Disaster Management
- April 2012 - Re-elected to Rajya Sabha
- Aug. 2014 - Member, Committee on the Welfare of Scheduled Castes and Scheduled Tribes
- Sept. 2014 - Member, Committee on Energy
- Dec. 2014 - Member, Committee on Member of Parliament Local Area Development Scheme (MPLADS)
