= Cunda Kammāraputta =

Disciple of Gautama Buddha

Cunda Kammāraputta चुन्द कम्मारपुत्त
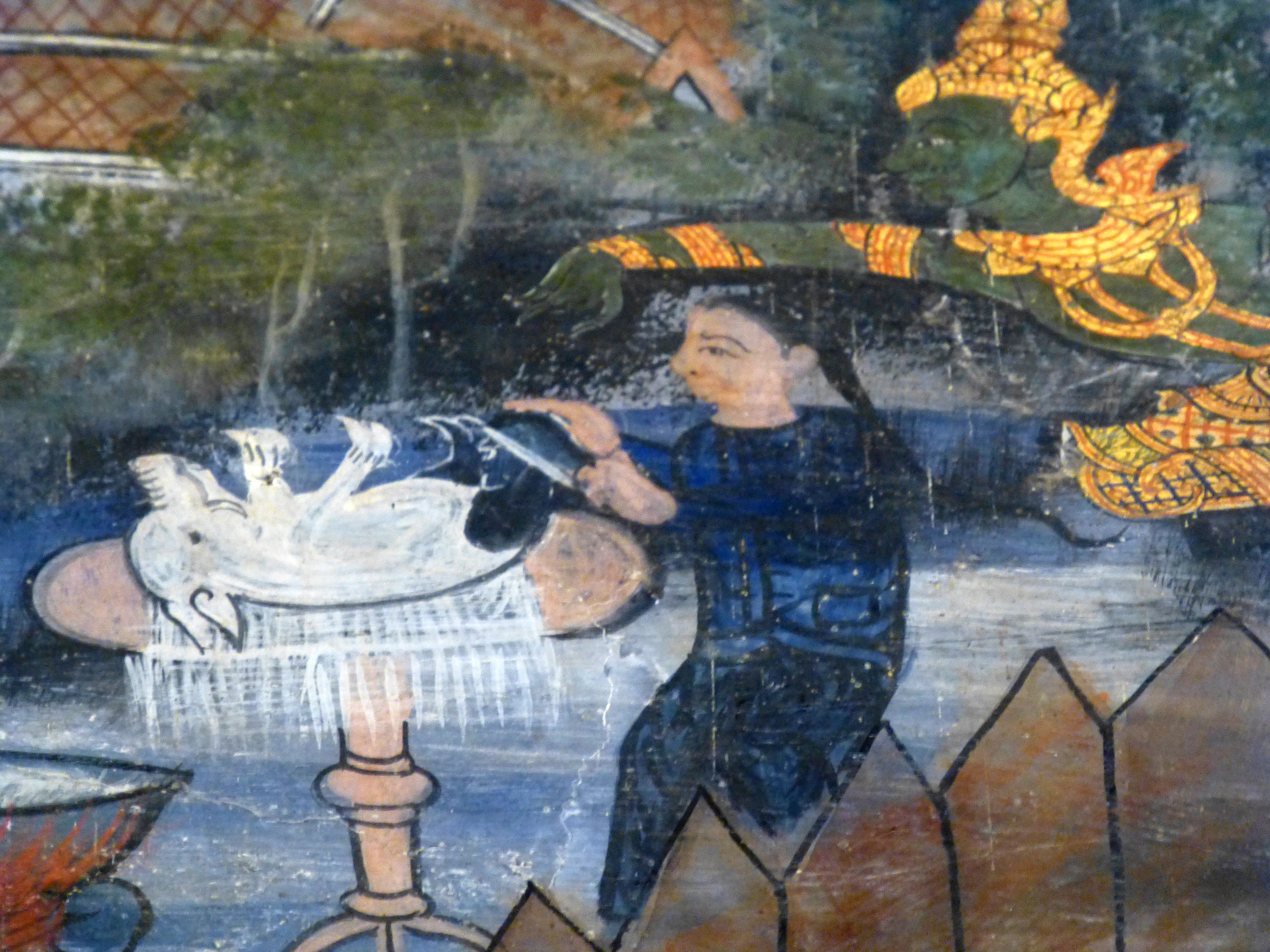
- Cunda preparing pork, Wat Kasatrathiraj, Ayutthaya

Personal life
- Born: चुन्द

Religious life
- Religion: Buddhism
- Dharma name: चुन्दो कम्मारपुत्तो
- Profession: Smith, Upasaka

Senior posting
- Teacher: Gautama Buddha
- Based in: Pāvā, kingdom of Malla

Cunda Kammāraputta was a smith who gave Gautama Buddha his last meal as an offering while he visited his mango grove in Pāvā on his way to Kuśīnagara. Shortly after having Cunda's meal, the Buddha suffered from fatal dysentery. (Note: The word used is lohitapakkhandikā which means diarrhea with blood.) The condition could have been Clostridial necrotizing enteritis due to a high protein (meat) diet.

Before entering the parinirvāṇa, the Buddha told Ānanda to visit Cunda and tell him that his meal had nothing to do with his getting ill, and therefore should feel no blame nor remorse; on the contrary, offering the Tathāgata his last meal before dying was of equal gain as of offering him his first meal before attaining buddhahood, and thus he should rejoice.

== Name ==
The name Kammāraputta (in Sanskrit, Karmāraputra) means son of the smith. In Chinese, his name, Chunda, is rendered as 準陀 (Zhǔntuó).

== Cunda as a lay follower of Gautama Buddha ==
In the Cunda Kammāraputta Sutta, Gautama Buddha stays at Cunda's mango grove and they talk about rites of purification. Cunda declares that he approves of the rites of the brahmins of the West and the Buddha mentions that the rites of purification of these brahmins and the purification in the discipline of the noble ones is quite different. Cunda asks him to explain how there is purification in his discipline, and so the Buddha teaches him the ten courses of skillful action. Cunda praises him for his teachings and declares himself a lay follower from that day on.

== Cunda's meal ==
In the Mahāparinibbāṇa Sutta, Gautama Buddha and a group of bhikkus stay at Cunda's mango grove and are offered by him a meal. The meal consists of sweet rice, cakes and sūkaramaddava, which is translated differently depending on the buddhist tradition. Since the word is composed by sūkara, which means pig, and maddava, which means soft, tender, delicate, two alternatives are possible:

1. Tender pig or boar meat.
2. What is enjoyed by pigs and boars.

In the latter meaning, the term has been thought to refer to a mushroom or truffle, or a yam or tuber. (Note: K.E. Neumann, in the preface to his German translation of the Majjhima Nikāya, quotes from an Indian compendium of medicinal plants, the Rajanigantu, several plants beginning with sūkara.) The idea that the Buddha's last meal consisted of pork is generally supported by the Theravada tradition; while that it was a vegetarian dish, by the Mahayana tradition. These may reflect the different traditional views on Buddhist vegetarianism and the monastic precepts.

In the sutta, the Buddha asks Cunda to serve the rice and cakes to the community of bhikkus, and to only serve the sūkaramaddava to him. Any leftovers should be buried in a pit. Cunda does as he is told.

Theravada scholar Buddhaghosa, the author of the earliest extant commentary that refers to the meal, interprets the term sūkara-maddava as the soft and oily flesh of a boar, adding that it was well-cooked under Chunda's instructions. According to later commentator Dhammapāla, this interpretation comes from the older commentary Mahā-atthakathā; Dhammapāla suggests that sūkara-maddava was either a bamboo shoot softened by boars or "mushroom grown in a place softened by boars". Old Chinese texts support Dhammapāla's suggestion, and Pali scholar Thomas William Rhys Davids translates the word as "truffle". Food historian K. T. Achaya notes that the Indian names of multiple plants begin with the word "sūkara" (Sanskrit shukara), so the word likely sūkara-maddava does not refer to pork: other Buddhist texts do not associate the word maddava with meat, and use the term sūkara-māmsa for pork.
