= Devendra Singh (politician) =

Indian politician

Devendra Singh Bhole

Member of Parliament, Lok Sabha
- Incumbent
- Assumed office 16 May 2014
- Preceded by: Raja Ram Pal
- Constituency: Akbarpur (Kanpur)

Minister of State (Independent Charge) Government of Uttar Pradesh
- In office 24 September 1997 – 24 March 1999
- Chief Minister: Kalyan Singh
- Ministry & Department's: Family Welfare

Minister of State Government of Uttar Pradesh
- In office 28 March 1997 – 23 September 1997
- Chief Minister: Mayawati
- Ministry & Department's: Medical Health

Member of Uttar Pradesh Legislative Assembly
- In office 17 October 1996 – 7 March 2002
- Preceded by: Ram Dass Pal
- Succeeded by: Kamlesh Kumar Pathak
- In office 22 June 1991 – 6 December 1992
- Preceded by: Bhagwandin Kushwaha
- Succeeded by: Ram Dass Pal
- Constituency: Derapur, Kanpur Dehat

Personal details
- Born: 2 April 1954 (age 72) Vill. Madhwapur, Dist. Auraiya (Uttar Pradesh)
- Party: Bharatiya Janata Party
- Spouse: Premsheela Singh (m. 1971)
- Profession: Agriculturist

Devendra Singh alias Bhole Singh (born 2 April 1954) is a member of the Bharatiya Janata Party and has won the 2014, 2019 and 2024 general election from the Akbarpur parliamentary constituency of Kanpur. He also won 1991 and 1996 Vidhan Sabha Election from Derapur Assembly constituency of Kanpur Dehat district.

== Early life and education ==
Devendra Singh was born on April 2, 1954, to Shri Darshan Singh and Smt. Kanak Rani. He completed High School from Board of High School and Intermediate Education Uttar Pradesh, Prayagraj.

== Positions held ==
16 May 2014: elected to 16th Lok Sabha (Lok Sabha Constituency Akbarpur-44)

1 Sep. 2014 onwards: Member, Standing Committee on Energy

== Political life ==
He started his career in politics as Bhartiya Janata Party worker. First time he participated in the by-elections in state assembly (UP) and won the seat from Derapur Legislative Assembly constituency. He was also winner as BJP candidate in UP state assembly general elections in 2007.
