= Seema Samridhi =

Indian advocate (born1982)

- Born: Etawah, Uttar Pradesh
- Education: Kanpur University, Uttar Pradesh Rajarshi Tandon Open University
- Occupation: Advocate
- Notable work: 2012 Delhi gang rape and murder
- Political party: Bhartiya Janta Party

Seema Samridhi Kushwaha is an advocate at the Supreme Court of India and former national spokesperson of Bahujan Samaj Party. She is known for being the legal counsel of the victim in the 2012 Delhi gang rape and murder case.

== Early life and education ==
Kushwaha was born in Ugarpur, Chakarnagar in Etawah district of Uttar Pradesh to Baladin Kushwaha and Ramkuwar Kushwaha.

Her father, Baladin Kushwaha was Gram Pradhan of Bidhipur Gram Panchayat. She completed her graduation in LL.B. from Chhatrapati Shahu Ji Maharaj University in 2005. She also received Bachelor of Journalism degree in 2006 from Uttar Pradesh Rajarshi Tandon Open University. After then, she did her M.A. in political science. She started legal practicing at the Supreme Court of India in 2014.

== Legal activism ==
When Nirbhaya's case came into light, she as a law trainee at that time participated in various protest demanding for justice. She officially became Nirbhaya's lawyer in 2014 demanding capital punishment for all four adult convicts as soon as possible. On 24 January 2014, she joined Nirbhaya Jyoti Trust as a legal adviser. Nirbhaya Jyoti Trust is an institution founded by the victim's parents to assist women who have experienced violence to find shelter and legal assistance. This was her first case. She pushed for Fast track court listing. Nevertheless, due to numerous review and curative petitions by convicts and slowness of the legal system, the case got delayed until finally, on 4 March 2020, a last death warrant was issued by court with the execution date as 20 March 2020 at 5:30 a.m. On 20 March 2020, at 5:30 a.m. IST, the four adult convicts were executed by hanging at Tihar Jail.
