= 1985 Uttar Pradesh Legislative Assembly election =

1985 Uttar Pradesh legislative assembly election
- 3 February and 3 May 1985

All 425 seats of Uttar Pradesh Legislative Assembly 213 seats needed for a majority
- Registered: 65,404,531
- Turnout: 45.64%
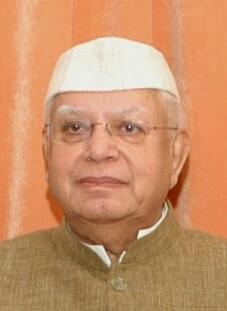

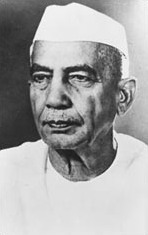

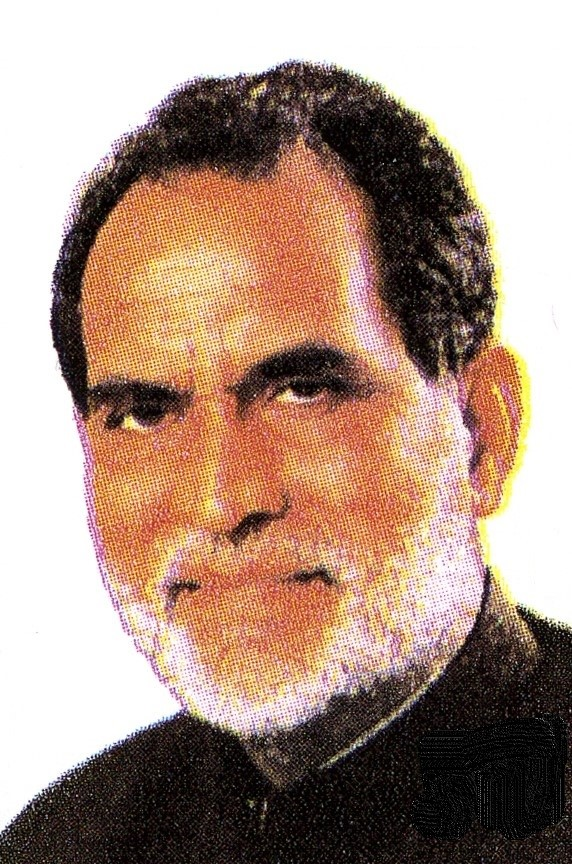
	Majority party	Minority party	Third party
Leader	Narayan Datt Tiwari	Charan Singh	Chandra Shekhar
Party	INC	LKD	JP
Leader's seat	Kashipur
Last election	309	New	4
Seats won	269	84	20
Seat change	▼40	New	▲16
Popular vote	11,544,698	6,304,455	1,646,005
Percentage	39.25%	21.43%	5.60%
Swing	▲1.6	New	▲5.59
Chief Minister before election
Narayan Datt Tiwari
INC
Elected Chief Minister
Narayan Datt Tiwari
INC

Elections to the Uttar Pradesh Legislative Assembly were held in phases, in February and May 1985, to elect members of the 425 constituencies in Uttar Pradesh, India. The Indian National Congress won a majority of seats as well as the popular vote, and Narayan Datt Tiwari was re-appointed as the Chief Minister of Uttar Pradesh.

This election was scheduled, as the five-year term of the members elected in the previous election, in 1980, was due to end in May 1985. After the passing of The Delimitation of Parliamentary and Assembly Constituencies Order, 1976, the constituencies were set to the ones used in this election.

== Result ==
Party	Votes	%	Seats	+/–
Indian National Congress	11,544,698	39.25	269	–40
Lok Dal	6,304,455	21.43	84	New
Bharatiya Janata Party	2,890,884	9.83	16	+5
Janata Party	1,646,005	5.60	20	+16
Communist Party of India	894,620	3.04	6	0
Indian National Congress (Jagjivan)	669,031	2.27	5	New
Doordarshi Party	228,688	0.78	0	New
Communist Party of India (Marxist)	198,780	0.68	2	0
Indian Congress (Socialist)	88,616	0.30	0	New
All India Forward Bloc	4,074	0.01	0	New
Revolutionary Socialist Party	1,297	0.00	0	New
Republican Party of India	562	0.00	0	0
Independents	4,942,962	16.80	23	+6
Total	29,414,672	100.00	425	0
Valid votes	29,414,672	98.53		
Invalid/blank votes	437,456	1.47		
Total votes	29,852,128	100.00		
Registered voters/turnout	65,404,531	45.64		
Source: ECI

== Elected members ==
Constituency	Reserved for (SC/ST/None)	Member	Party
Uttarkashi	SC	Baldeo Singh Arya	Indian National Congress
Tehri	None	Lokendra Dutt Saklani	Indian National Congress
Deoprayag	None	Shurvir Singh Sajwaya	Indian National Congress
Lansdowne	None	Surendra Singh	Indian National Congress
Pauri	None	Pushkar Singh	Indian National Congress
Karanprayag	None	Shiva Nand Nautiyal	Lok Dal
Badrikedar	None	Santan Barthwal	Indian National Congress
Didihat	None	Kashi Singh Airy	Independent
Pithoragarh	None	Kamal Kishan Pandey	Janata Party
Almora	None	Saraswati Devi	Indian National Congress
Bageshwar	SC	Gopal Ram Das	Indian National Congress
Ranikhet	None	Pooran Singh	Indian National Congress
Nainital	None	Kishan Singh Taragi	Indian National Congress
Khatima	None	Suresh Chandra	Indian National Congress
Haldwani	None	Moti Ram	Indian National Congress
Kashipur	None	Narayan Dutt Tiwari	Indian National Congress
Seohara	None	Shiv Nath Singh	Indian National Congress
Dhampur	None	Basant Singh	Indian National Congress
Afzalgarh	None	Mohmoodul Hasan Ansari	Indian National Congress
Nagina	SC	Omwati Devi	Indian National Congress
Nazibabad	SC	Sukkam Singh	Indian National Congress
Bijnor	None	Azizur Rahman	Indian National Congress
Chandpur	None	Ku. Devendra Singh	Indian National Congress
Kanth	None	Samar Pal Singh	Indian National Congress
Amroha	None	Mohd Hayat	Lok Dal
Hasanpur	None	Kaushik Rama Shankar	Indian National Congress
Gangeshwari	SC	Bhagwan Das	Indian National Congress
Sambhal	None	Shafiqur Rahman Barq	Lok Dal
Bahjoi	None	Bijendrapal Singh	Indian National Congress
Chandausi	SC	Phool Kunwar	Indian National Congress
Kundarki	None	Rina Kumari	Indian National Congress
Moradabad West	None	Mohd. Akil Urf Munna Miya	Indian National Congress
Moradabad	None	Pushpa Singhal	Indian National Congress
Moradabad Rural	None	Mohd. Rizwanul Haq	Lok Dal
Thakurdwara	None	Sakhawat Husain	Indian National Congress
Suartanda	None	Nisar Husain	Indian National Congress
Rampur	None	Mohammad Azam Khan	Lok Dal
Bilaspur	None	Daljit Singh	Indian National Congress
Shahabad	SC	Jagan Singh	Lok Dal
Bisauli	None	Yogendra Kumar	Independent
Gunnaur	None	Pushpadevi	Indian National Congress
Sahaswan	None	Naresh Pal Singh Yadav	Lok Dal
Bilsi	SC	Bhola Shanker Maurya	Indian National Congress
Budaun	None	Premila Bhadwar Mehra	Indian National Congress
Usehat	None	Nirottam Singh	Indian National Congress
Binawar	None	Mohd. Abkar Ahmed	Indian National Congress
Dataganj	None	Avneesh Kuamar Singh	Bharatiya Janata Party
Aonla	None	Shyam Bihari Singh	Bharatiya Janata Party
Sunha	None	Rameshwar Nath Chaubey	Indian National Congress
Faridpur	SC	Nathu Lal Vikal	Indian National Congress
Bareilly Cantonment	None	Raffiq Ahmed Alias Rafian	Indian National Congress
Bareilly City	None	Dinesh Jouhari	Bharatiya Janata Party
Nawabganj	None	Chet Ram Gangwar	Indian National Congress
Bhojipura	None	Narendra Pal Singh	Indian National Congress
Kawar	None	Jaideep Singh	Indian National Congress
Baheri	None	Amba Prasad	Indian National Congress
Pilibhit	None	Seyed Ali Ashrafi	Indian National Congress
Barkhera	SC	Kishan Lal	Bharatiya Janata Party
Bisalpur	None	Tej Bahadur Gangwar	Indian National Congress
Puranpur	None	Vinod Kumar	Indian National Congress
Powayan	SC	Chetram	Indian National Congress
Nigohi	None	Ahiwaran	Indian National Congress
Tilhar	None	Satya Pal Singh	Lok Dal
Jalalabad	None	Udaivere Singh	Indian National Congress
Dadraul	None	Ram Autar Mishra Alais Nanku	Indian National Congress
Shahjahanpur	None	Nawab Sikander Ali Khan	Indian National Congress
Mohammadi	SC	Banshi Dhar Raj	Indian National Congress
Haiderabad	None	Ram Bhajan Lal	Indian National Congress
Paila	SC	Nangaram	Lok Dal
Lakhimpur	None	Kanti Singh Visen	Indian National Congress
Srinagar	None	Kamal Ahmed Rizavi	Indian National Congress
Nighasan	None	Satish Ajmani	Indian National Congress
Dhaurehara	None	Swarswati Pratap Singh	Independent
Behta	None	Ganga Swaroop Bhatnagar	Indian National Congress
Biswan	None	Padma Seth	Indian National Congress
Mahmoodabad	None	Raja Mohd. Amir Mohd. Khan	Indian National Congress
Sidhauli	SC	Ramlal S/o Laltoo	Indian National Congress
Laharpur	None	Buniyad Husain Absari	Lok Dal
Sitapur	None	Rajendra Gupta	Bharatiya Janata Party
Hargaon	SC	Ch. Paragilal	Indian National Congress
Misrikh	None	Ram Ratan Singh	Indian National Congress
Machhrehta	SC	Ram Krishna	Independent
Beniganj	SC	Ram Pal	Independent
Sandila	None	Kudesiya Begum	Indian National Congress
Ahirori	SC	Parmi Lal	Lok Dal
Hardoi	None	Uma Tripathi	Indian National Congress
Bawan	SC	Nathhu Lal	Indian National Congress
Pihani	None	Ashok Bajpai	Janata Party
Shahabad	None	Ram Autar Dixit	Indian National Congress
Bilgram	None	Hari Shankar	Indian National Congress
Mallawan	None	Ram Asrey	Independent
Bangarmau	None	Gopi Nath Dikshit	Indian National Congress
Safipur	SC	Sunder Lal	Lok Dal
Unnao	None	Manohar Lal	Lok Dal
Hadha	None	Sachidanand Bajpayi	Indian National Congress
Bhagwant Nagar	None	Bhagwati Singh Visarad	Indian National Congress
Purwa	None	Hirday Narayan Dixit	Independent
Hasanganj	SC	Badri Prasad	Indian National Congress
Malihabad	SC	Krishna Rawat	Indian National Congress
Mohana	None	Bhagoti Singh	Independent
Lucknow East	None	Swaroop Kumari Bakshi	Indian National Congress
Lucknow West	None	Jafar Ali Naqvi	Indian National Congress
Lucknow Central	None	Naresh Chandra	Indian National Congress
Lucknow Cantonment	None	Premavati Tiwari	Indian National Congress
Sarojini Nagar	None	Sharda Partap	Independent
Mohanlalganj	SC	Chaudhary Tara Chand Sonkar	Indian National Congress
Bachhrawan	SC	Shiv Darshan	Indian National Congress
Tiloi	None	Mohammd Wasim	Indian National Congress
Rae Bareli	None	Ramesh Chandra Shukla	Indian National Congress
Sataon	None	Kamal Nayan Verma	Indian National Congress
Sareni	None	Surendra Bahadur Singh	Independent
Dalmau	None	Har Narayan Singh	Indian National Congress
Salon	SC	Shiv Balak	Indian National Congress
Kunda	None	Niaz Hasan	Indian National Congress
Bihar	SC	Sarju Prasad Saroj	Indian National Congress
Rampurkhas	None	Pramod Tiwari	Indian National Congress
Garwara	None	Ram Naresh Shukla	Indian National Congress
Pratapgarh	None	Lal Pratap Singh	Indian National Congress
Birapur	None	Ram Raj Shukla	Indian National Congress
Patti	None	Vasudeo Singh	Indian National Congress
Amethi	None	Raj Kumar Sanjai Singh	Indian National Congress
Gauriganj	None	Rajpati Devi	Indian National Congress
Jagdishpur	SC	Ram Sevak	Indian National Congress
Isauli	None	Jai Narain Tiwari	Indian National Congress
Sultanpur	None	Muid Ahmad	Indian National Congress
Jaisinghpur	None	Davendra Pandey	Indian National Congress
Chanda	None	Sheo Narain Mishra	Indian National Congress
Kadipur	SC	Ram Asre	Indian National Congress
Katehari	None	Ravindra Nath Tiwari	Janata Party
Akbarpur	None	Akbar Husain Babar	Communist Party of India
Jalalpur	None	Sher Bahadur Singh	Independent
Jahangirganj	SC	Krishna Kumar	Indian National Congress
Tanda	None	Jai Ram Verma	Indian National Congress
Ayodhya	None	Surendra Partap Singh	Indian National Congress
Bikapur	None	Sita Ram Nishad	Indian National Congress
Milkipur	None	Mitrasen Yadav	Communist Party of India
Sohawal	SC	Awadhesh Prasad	Lok Dal
Rudauli	None	Margoob Ahmad Khan	Indian National Congress
Dariyabad	None	Rajeev Kumar Singh	Independent
Siddhaur	None	Ram Sagar	Lok Dal
Haidergarh	None	Surendra Nath	Indian National Congress
Masauli	None	Beni Prasad Verma	Lok Dal
Nawabganj	None	Ram Chandra Bakhsh Singh	Communist Party of India
Fatehpur	SC	Nattha Ram	Indian National Congress
Ramnagar	None	Farid Mahfooz Kidwai	Lok Dal
Kaiserganj	None	Eahtisham Wali Khan	Indian National Congress
Fakharpur	None	Mayankar Singh	Bharatiya Janata Party
Mahsi	None	Indra Pratap Singh	Indian National Congress
Nanpara	None	Deota Deen	Indian National Congress
Charda	SC	Tribhawan Prasad	Indian National Congress
Bhinga	None	Khursed Ahmad	Independent
Bahraich	None	Maharan Nath Kaul	Indian National Congress
Ikauna	SC	Ram Sagar Rao	Indian National Congress
Gainsari	None	Arun Pratap Singh	Indian National Congress
Tulsipur	None	Mangal Deo	Indian National Congress
Balrampur	None	Man Bahadur Singh	Indian National Congress
Utraula	None	Fazlul Bari	Independent
Sadullah Nagar	None	Mohd. Umar	Indian National Congress
Mankapur	SC	Ram Vishun Azad	Indian National Congress
Mujehna	None	Ram Pal Singh	Indian National Congress
Gonda	None	Raghu Prasad Upadhayaya	Indian National Congress
Katra Bazar	None	Fasiurrahman Alias Munnan Khan	Lok Dal
Colonelganj	None	Umeshwar Pratap Singh	Indian National Congress
Dixir	SC	Babu Lal	Indian National Congress
Harraiya	None	Sukhpal Pandey	Lok Dal
Captainganj	None	Ambika Singh	Indian National Congress
Nagar East	SC	Ram Jiyavan	Indian National Congress
Basti	None	Almelu Ammal	Indian National Congress
Ramnagar	None	Kesri	Indian National Congress
Domariaganj	None	Kamal Usuf Malik	Lok Dal
Itwa	None	Mata Prasad Pandey	Lok Dal
Shohratgarh	None	Kamala Sahni	Indian National Congress
Naugarh	None	Dhanraj Yadav	Bharatiya Janata Party
Bansi	None	Harish Chandra(harishji)	Bharatiya Janata Party
Khesraha	None	Diwakar Vikram Singh	Lok Dal
Menhdawal	None	Afsar-u-ahmad	Indian National Congress
Khalilabad	None	Dwarika	Indian National Congress
Hainsarbazar	SC	Genda Devi	Indian National Congress
Bansgaon	SC	Kailash Prasad	Indian National Congress
Dhuriapar	None	Achyuta Nand Tiwari	Independent
Chillupar	None	Hari Shankar Tiwari	Independent
Kauriram	None	Lal Chand Nishad	Indian National Congress
Mundera Bazar	SC	Sharda Devi	Lok Dal
Pipraich	None	Sayed Javed Ali	Indian National Congress
Gorakhpur	None	Sunil Shastri	Indian National Congress
Maniram	None	Bhrigu Nath Bhatt	Indian National Congress
Sahjanwa	None	Triyugi Narain Mishra	Indian National Congress
Paniara	None	Vir Bahadur Singh	Indian National Congress
Pharenda	None	Harsh Vardhan	Janata Party
Lakshmipur	None	Virendra Pratap Shahi	Independent
Siswa	None	Shivendra Singh Urf Shiv Babu	Indian National Congress
Maharajganj	SC	Ram Lakshan	Indian National Congress
Shyamdeurawa	None	Janardhan Prasad Ojha	Janata Party
Naurangia	SC	Baij Nath	Indian National Congress
Ramkola	None	Sugrive Singh	Indian National Congress
Hata	SC	Videshi Prasad Bharti	Indian National Congress
Padrauna	None	Baleshwar	Lok Dal
Seorahi	None	Ram Sakal Tiwari	Indian National Congress
Fazilnagar	None	Shashi Sharma	Indian National Congress
Kasia	None	Surya Pratap Shahi	Bharatiya Janata Party
Gauri Bazar	None	Ranjit	Janata Party
Rudrapur	None	Gorakh Nath	Indian National Congress
Deoria	None	Fajale Masood	Indian National Congress
Bhatpar Rani	None	Kameshwar Upadhyay	Independent
Salempur	None	Awadhesh Pratap Mall	Indian National Congress
Barhaj	None	Surendra Prasad	Indian National Congress
Nathupur	None	Vishun Deo	Janata Party
Ghosi	None	Phagu Chauhan	Lok Dal
Sagri	None	Ram Jaman	Lok Dal
Gopalpur	None	Qazu Kalimur Rahman	Indian National Congress
Azamgarh	None	Durga Prasad	Independent
Nizamabad	None	Mohd. Masud	Lok Dal
Atraulia	None	Balram	Lok Dal
Phulpur	None	Ramakant	Indian National Congress
Saraimir	SC	Bhikha Ram	Indian National Congress
Mehnagar	SC	Deep Narain	Indian National Congress
Lalganj	None	Sri Prakash	Janata Party
Mubarakpur	None	Hafeez Bharti	Independent
Muhammadabad Gohna	SC	Ram Badan	Indian National Congress
Mau	None	Aqbal Ahmad	Communist Party of India
Rasra	SC	Har Deo	Indian National Congress
Siar	None	Shardanand Anchal	Lok Dal
Chilkahar	None	Ram Govind Choudhary	Janata Party
Sikanderpur	None	Sheomangal Singh	Lok Dal
Bansdih	None	Vijay Lakshmi	Janata Party
Doaba	None	Manager Singh	Janata Party
Ballia	None	Vikarmaditya Pandey	Janata Party
Kopachit	None	Gauri Shanker Bhaiya	Janata Party
Zahoorabad	None	Surendra	Indian National Congress
Mohammadabad	None	Afzal Ansari	Communist Party of India
Dildarnagar	None	Awadhesh Rai Shastri	Indian National Congress
Zamania	None	Chaudhari Lalta Prasad Nishad	Indian National Congress
Ghazipur	None	Amitabh Anil Dubey	Indian National Congress
Jakhania	SC	Jhilmit Ram	Indian National Congress
Sadat	SC	Ram Nath Munshi	Indian National Congress
Saidpur	None	Rajit	Lok Dal
Dhanapur	None	Ram Janam	Indian National Congress
Chandauli	SC	Sankatha Prasad	Indian National Congress
Chakiya	SC	Kharpat Ram	Indian National Congress
Mughalsarai	None	Ram Chandar	Indian National Congress
Varanasi Cantonment	None	Sharrudh Prakash	Lok Dal
Varanasi South	None	Rajni Kant	Indian National Congress
Varanasi North	None	Mohd. Safiurrahman Ansari	Indian National Congress
Chiraigaon	None	Sri Nath Singh	Indian National Congress
Kolasla	None	Ramkaran Patel	Indian National Congress
Gangapur	None	Rajkishore	Communist Party of India
Aurai	None	Nihala Singh	Janata Party
Gyanpur	None	Sharda Prasad Bind	Indian National Congress
Bhadohi	SC	Mulchand	Lok Dal
Barsathi	None	Paras Nath	Lok Dal
Mariahu	None	Doodh Nath	Lok Dal
Kerakat	SC	Gajraj Ram	Indian National Congress
Bayalsi	None	Raj Bahadur	Janata Party
Jaunpur	None	Chandrasen	Lok Dal
Rari	None	Arjun Singh Yadav	Lok Dal
Shahganj	SC	Deep Chandra	Lok Dal
Khutahan	None	Jang Bahadur	Indian National Congress
Garwara	None	Lakshmi Narain	Lok Dal
Machhlishahr	None	Keshri Prasad	Indian National Congress
Dudhi	SC	Vijay Singh	Indian National Congress
Robertsganj	SC	Kallu Ram	Indian National Congress
Rajgarh	None	Narendra Reo	Indian National Congress
Chunar	None	Yadunath Singh	Lok Dal
Majhwa	None	Lokpati Tripathi	Indian National Congress
Mirzapur	None	Asrafiman	Indian National Congress
Chhanyey	SC	Bhagwati Prasad	Indian National Congress
Meja	SC	Bishram Das	Indian National Congress
Karchana	None	Kunwar Revati Raman Singh	Janata Party
Bara	None	Rama Kant Mishra	Indian National Congress
Jhusi	None	Mahendra Pratap Singh	Indian National Congress
Handia	None	Rakesh Dhar Tripathi	Janata Party
Pratappur	None	Shyamsurat Upadhayay	Indian National Congress
Soraon	None	Bhola Singh	Indian National Congress
Nawabganj	None	Jawahar Singh Yadav	Lok Dal
Allahabad North	None	Anugrah Narain Singh	Lok Dal
Allahabad South	None	Satish Chandra Jaiswal	Indian National Congress
Allahabad West	None	Gopal Das Yadav	Lok Dal
Chail	SC	Shailender Kumar	Indian National Congress
Manjhanpur	SC	Iswar Sharan Vidharty	Indian National Congress
Sirathu	SC	Purushottam Lal	Indian National Congress
Khaga	None	Krishna Dutt Alias Balraj	Indian National Congress
Kishunpur	SC	Inderjit	Indian National Congress
Haswa	None	Amar Nath Singh	Indian National Congress
Fatehpur	None	Khan Gufran Jahandi	Indian National Congress
Jahanabad	None	Prakash Naraian	Indian National Congress
Bindki	None	Anchal Singh	Lok Dal
Aryanagar	None	Hafiz Mohammad Umar	Indian National Congress
Sisamau	SC	Kamla Daryabadi	Indian National Congress
Generalganj	None	Birendra Nath Dixit	Indian National Congress
Kanpur Cantonment	None	Pashupati Nath	Indian National Congress
Govind Nagar	None	Vilayeeti Ram Katyal	Indian National Congress
Kalyanpur	None	R.n.pathak	Indian National Congress
Sarsaul	None	Jauhari Lal Trivedi	Lok Dal
Ghatampur	None	Shivnath Singh Kushwaha	Indian National Congress
Bhognipur	SC	Radhy Shyam	Indian National Congress
Rajpur	None	Chowdhry Narender Singh	Indian National Congress
Sarvankhera	None	Ajit Kumar Singh	Indian National Congress
Chaubepur	None	Nekchandra Pandey	Indian National Congress
Bilhaur	SC	Hanuman Prasad Kureel	Indian National Congress
Derapur	None	Bhagwandin Kushwaha	Lok Dal
Auraiya	None	Kamlesh Kumar Patak	Lok Dal
Ajitmal	SC	Gauri Shanker	Indian National Congress
Lakhna	SC	Gaya Prasad Verma	Lok Dal
Etawah	None	Sukhda Mishra	Indian National Congress
Jaswantnagar	None	Mulayam Singh Yadav	Lok Dal
Bharthana	None	Ch. Maharaj Singh	Lok Dal
Bidhuna	None	Ausan Singh	Bharatiya Janata Party
Kannauj	SC	Bihari Lal Dohrey	Indian National Congress
Umarda	None	Rama Nandani Verma	Lok Dal
Chhibramau	None	Santosh	Indian National Congress
Kamalganj	None	Maharam Singh	Indian National Congress
Farrukhabad	None	Brahm Dutt Dwivedi	Bharatiya Janata Party
Kaimganj	None	Rajendar Singh	Independent
Mohammdabad	None	Narendar Singh Yadav	Indian National Congress
Manikpur	SC	Shrimoni Bhai	Indian National Congress
Karwi	None	Ramsajiwan	Communist Party of India
Baberu	None	Dev Kumar Yadav	Independent
Tindwari	None	Arjun Singh	Indian National Congress
Banda	None	Jamuna Prasad Bose	Janata Party
Naraini	None	Shrender Pal Verma	Communist Party of India
Hamirpur	None	Jagdish Narain	Indian National Congress
Maudaha	None	Kunwar Bahadur Misra	Indian National Congress
Rath	None	Doonger Singh	Indian National Congress
Charkhari	SC	Mihi Lal	Indian National Congress
Mahoba	None	Babu Lal	Indian National Congress
Mehroni	None	Devendra Kumar Singh	Bharatiya Janata Party
Lalitpur	None	Rajesh Kumar Khera	Indian National Congress
Jhansi	None	Om Prakash Richeariya	Indian National Congress
Babina	SC	Beni Bai	Indian National Congress
Mauranipur	None	Bhagirath Chaudhry	Indian National Congress
Garautha	None	Kanwar Manvendra Singh	Bharatiya Janata Party
Konch	SC	Ch. Shyam Lal	Indian National Congress
Orai	None	Arvind Tiwari	Indian National Congress
Kalpi	None	Badri Singh	Indian National Congress
Madhogarh	None	Ram Prakash Singh	Indian National Congress
Bhongaon	None	Shiv Bachh Singh	Indian National Congress
Kishni	SC	Ram Singh	Indian National Congress
Karhal	None	Babu Ram Yadav	Lok Dal
Shikohabad	None	Ram Naresh	Independent
Jasrana	None	Balvir Singh	Lok Dal
Ghiror	None	Jag Mohan Singh	Lok Dal
Mainpuri	None	Raghubir Singh Yadav	Indian National Congress
Aliganj	None	Udaivir Singh Rathore	Indian National Congress
Patiyali	None	Rajindra Singh	Indian National Congress
Sakeet	None	Virender Singh	Janata Party
Soron	None	Urmila Agnihotri	Indian National Congress
Kasganj	None	Manpal Singh	Indian National Congress
Etah	None	Atar Singh Yadav	Lok Dal
Nidhauli Kalan	None	Ramesh Chandra	Lok Dal
Jalesar	SC	Prem Pal Singh	Indian National Congress
Firozabad	None	Raghubar Dayal Verma	Janata Party
Bah	None	Amar Chand	Indian National Congress
Fatehabad	None	Amitab Lavania	Indian National Congress
Tundla	SC	Ashok Sehra	Indian National Congress
Etmadpur	SC	Chandra Bhan	Lok Dal
Dayalbagh	None	Vijay Singh Rana	Lok Dal
Agra Cantonment	None	Krishan Vir Singh Kaushal	Indian National Congress
Agra East	None	Satya Prakash Vikal	Bharatiya Janata Party
Agra West	SC	Virendra Son	Indian National Congress
Kheragarh	None	Bahadur Singh	Indian National Congress
Fatehpur Sikri	None	Badan Singh	Lok Dal
Goverdhan	SC	Baljeet	Indian National Congress
Mathura	None	Pradeep Mathur	Indian National Congress
Chhata	None	Laxmi Narain	Lok Dal
Mat	None	Kushal Pal Singh	Lok Dal
Gokul	None	Sardar Singh	Lok Dal
Sadabad	None	Mustmand Ali Khan	Lok Dal
Hathras	None	Narain Hari Sharma	Indian National Congress
Sasni	SC	Bangali Singh	Lok Dal
Sikandara Rao	None	Suresh Pratap Singh	Lok Dal
Gangiri	None	Tilak Singh	Indian National Congress
Atrauli	None	Kalyan Singh	Bharatiya Janata Party
Aligarh	None	Baldev Singh	Indian National Congress
Koil	SC	Kishan Lal Diler	Bharatiya Janata Party
Iglas	None	Rajendra Singh	Lok Dal
Barauli	None	Surendra Singh	Indian National Congress
Khair	None	Jag Vir	Lok Dal
Jewar	SC	Ratan Swarup	Indian National Congress
Khurja	None	Budhpal Singh Khurja Wala	Indian National Congress
Debai	None	Hitesh Kumari	Indian National Congress
Anupshahr	None	Praveen Kumar Sharma	Indian National Congress
Siana	None	Imtiaz Mohammad Khan	Indian National Congress
Agota	None	Kiranpal Singh	Lok Dal
Bulandshahr	None	S. Saidul Hasan	Indian National Congress
Shikarpur	SC	Trilok Chander	Lok Dal
Sikandrabad	None	Rajendra Singh Solanki	Indian National Congress
Dadri	None	Mahendra Singh Bhati	Lok Dal
Ghaziabad	None	Krishan Kumar Sharma	Indian National Congress
Muradnagar	None	Sakhawat Husain	Lok Dal
Modinagar	None	Vimla Singh	Indian National Congress
Hapur	SC	Gaj Raj Singh	Indian National Congress
Garhmukteshwar	None	Kanak Singh	Lok Dal
Kithore	None	Prabhu Dayal	Lok Dal
Hastinapur	SC	Harsharan Singh	Indian National Congress
Sardhana	None	Abdul Wahid Qureshi	Lok Dal
Meerut Cantonment	None	Ajit Singh Sethi	Indian National Congress
Meerut	None	Jai Narain Sharma	Indian National Congress
Kharkhauda	None	Rajendra Sharma	Indian National Congress
Siwalkhas	SC	Nanak Chand	Indian National Congress
Khekra	None	Richhpal Pal Singh Bansal	Lok Dal
Baghpat	None	Kokab Hameed	Indian National Congress
Barnawa	None	Bhopal Singh	Lok Dal
Chhaprauli	None	Saroj Verma	Lok Dal
Kandhla	None	Virendra Singh	Lok Dal
Khatauli	None	Harender Singh	Lok Dal
Jansath	SC	Deepak Kumar	Indian National Congress
Morna	None	Sayeeduzzama	Indian National Congress
Muzaffarnagar	None	Charushila	Indian National Congress
Charthawal	SC	Phool Singh	Indian National Congress
Baghra	None	Babu Singh	Indian National Congress
Kairana	None	Hukum Singh	Indian National Congress
Thana Bhawan	None	Amir Alam Khan	Lok Dal
Nakur	None	Ram Sharan	Lok Dal
Sarsawa	None	Nirbhaypal Sharma	Indian National Congress
Nagal	SC	Chaman Lal Chaman	Indian National Congress
Deoband	None	Mahavir Singh	Indian National Congress
Harora	SC	Vimla Rakesh	Lok Dal
Saharanpur	None	Surendra Kapil	Indian National Congress
Muzaffarabad	None	Mohd. Aslam Khan	Indian National Congress
Roorkee	None	Qazi Mohiuddin	Lok Dal
Lhaksar	None	Narendra Singh	Lok Dal
Hardwar	None	Mahavir Singh Rana	Indian National Congress
Mussoorie	None	Kishori Lal	Indian National Congress
Dehra Dun	None	Hira Singh Bist	Indian National Congress
Chakrata	ST	Gulab Singh	Indian National Congress

== Bypolls ==
Date	Constituency	Reason for by-poll	Winning candidate	Party
1987	Kashipur	Resignation of N. Datt	A. Ahmed	Independent
1987	Patti	Death of V. Singh	A.P. Singh	Indian National Congress
1987	Rath	Death of D. Singh	R. Singh	Indian National Congress
1988	Tanda	Death of J R Verma	G. Nath	Lok Dal
1988	Chhaprauli	Death of S. Verma	N. Singh	Janata Party
Source:ECI

== See also ==
- List of constituencies of the Uttar Pradesh Legislative Assembly
- 1985 elections in India
