= Garwara Assembly constituency =

Former constituency of the Uttar Pradesh legislative assembly in India

Coordinates: 25.97°N 81.93°E

Garwara
- Former constituency for the Uttar Pradesh Legislative Assembly

Constituency details
- Country: India
- Region: North India
- State: Uttar Pradesh
- District: Jaunpur
- Established: 1974
- Abolished: 2012

Garwara is a former constituency of the Uttar Pradesh Legislative Assembly in the Indian state of Uttar Pradesh.

== Members of the Legislative Assembly ==
Year	Candidate	Party	Total Vote
2007	Seema Dwivedi	BJP	43236
2002	Lal Bahadur	SP	51351
1996	Seema Dwivedi	BJP	39881
1993	Umashankar	BSP	38859
1991	Ramesh Bahadur Singh	BJP	27253
1989	Rai Laxmi Narayan Singh	JD	23872
1985	Ram Naresh Shukla	INC	31528
1980	Ram Shiromani	INC(I)	19334
1977	Ram Shiromani	INC	23157
1974	Ram Shiromani Dubey	INC	15639

== See also ==
Jaunpur Assembly constituency
