= Satyendra Narayan Kushwaha =

Indian politician

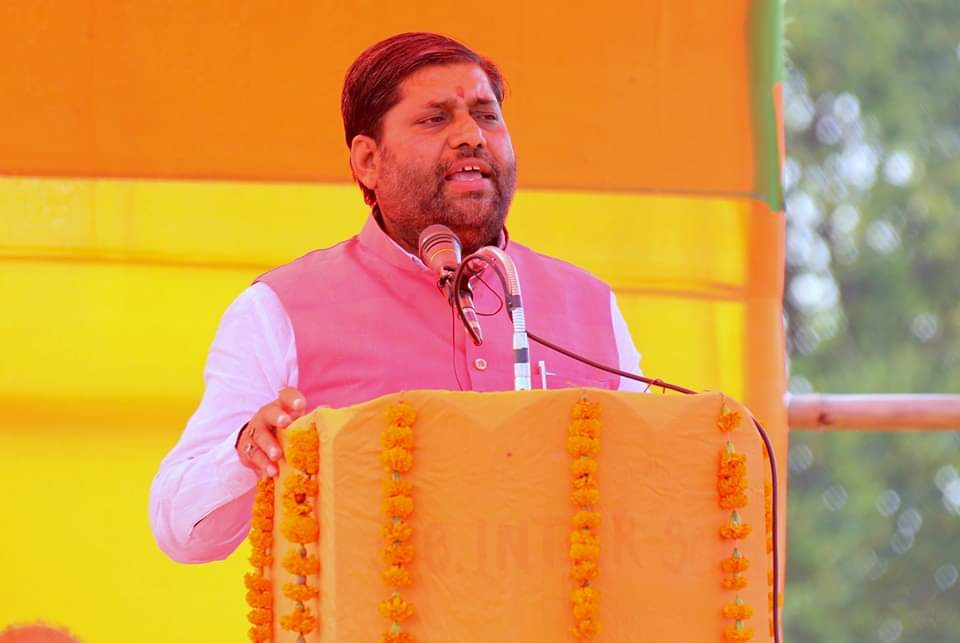

Member of Bihar Legislative Council
- In office 7 May 2012 – 11 January 2018
- Constituency: elected by Members of Legislative Assembly

Personal details
- Born: 14 January 1969
- Died: 10 January 2018 (aged 48) Patna, Bihar
- Political party: Bharatiya Janata Party
- Spouse: Sulekha Kushwaha
- Children: 2 sons, 1 daughter
- Parent: Omkar Kushwaha (father)
- Education: B. A. (Hons)

Satyendra Narayan Kushwaha was an Indian politician from Bharatiya Janata Party, Bihar who served as the member of Bihar Legislative Council from 2012 till his death in 2018. He has served in various capacities in the organization of the BJP as the President of the BJYM, Bihar in 2005, State President of the BJP Kisan Morcha in 2007, State Secretary of the Bharatiya Janata Party, Bihar in 2009. He also served as the co-incharge of the Bharatiya Janata Party, Uttar Pradesh.

== Illness and death ==
Kushwaha was admitted to the Indira Gandhi Institute of Medical Sciences two years ago after he suffered a brain stroke. He died at 1:35 am on 10 January
