= Manoj Singh Kushwaha =

Indian politician

Manoj Kushwaha

Member of the Bihar Legislative Assembly
- In office 2005–2015
- Preceded by: Basawan Prasad Bhagat
- Succeeded by: Kedar Prasad Gupta
- Constituency: Kurhani

Personal details
- Born: Muzaffarpur
- Party: Janata Dal (United)
- Children: 02(son and daughter)
- Parent: Brahmanand Singh (father)

Manoj Singh Kushwaha is a former minister of Bihar. Kushwaha was the Minor Water Resources minister in the Jitan Ram Manjhi cabinet in 2014–15. He contested from the Kurhani Assembly constituency in February 2005, November 2005 and 2010 legislative assembly elections, and was victorious.

== Political career ==
Kushwaha is a senior leader of Janata Dal (United) and he was member of legislative assembly for 10 years continuously from 2005 to 2015 on the ticket of JDU. In 2015 legislative assembly elections to Bihar Assembly, the alliance of JDU and Rashtriya Janata Dal made him their candidate from the Kurhani constituency, but he was defeated by his rival candidate from the Bhartiya Janata Party, Kedar Prasad Gupta.

In 2020, when JDU once again changed its alliance and came together with Bhartiya Janata Party once again, against its former ally Rashtriya Janata Dal, Kushwaha was not the preferred choice for the candidature of the alliance from the Kurhani assembly. The Kurhani seat, from which he contested earlier in 2005 and 2010 was allotted to the Bhartiya Janata Party and JDU made him its candidate from the Minapur Assembly constituency. He refused to contest from Minapur Assembly Constituency. In December 2022, after the cancellation of Legislative Assembly membership of RJD MLA Anil Sahni on certain grounds, from the Kurhani Constituency, the bypolls were conducted and Kushwaha was made the candidate by the Mahagathbandan (the newly formed alliance of JDU under Nitish Kumar and RJD under Tejashwi Yadav).

== See also ==
- Ajit Kushwaha
