= Ramratan Kushwaha =

Indian politician

Member of the Uttar Pradesh legislative assembly
- In office 2017–2022
- Constituency: Lalitpur, Lalitpur district

Personal details
- Party: Bharatiya Janata Party
- Occupation: MLA
- Profession: Politician

Ramratan Kushwaha is an Indian politician and a member of 17th Uttar Pradesh Assembly of Lalitpur, Uttar Pradesh of India. He represents the Lalitpur constituency of Uttar Pradesh and is a member of the Bharatiya Janata Party.

== Political career ==
Kushwaha has been a member of the 17th Legislative Assembly of Uttar Pradesh. Since 2017, he has represented the Lalitpur constituency and is a member of the BJP.

== Posts held ==
#	From	To	Position	Comments
01	2017	Incumbent	Member, 17th Legislative Assembly	

== See also ==
- Uttar Pradesh Legislative Assembly
