= Janakdhari Prasad Kushwaha =

Indian politician

Janakdhari Prasad also Known as Janakdhari Prasad Kushwaha was an Indian politician and a member of Bihar Legislative Assembly from Minapur Assembly constituency of the Muzaffarpur district of Bihar. He was a leader of Communist Party of India. He was elected to the Bihar Legislative Assembly from this constituency in 1980. Earlier, he contested the assembly elections of 1977 as well, but lost. He contested in 1977 as an independent candidate, finishing in the first runner-up position. In 1980 elections, he defeated Mahendra Sahani of Indian National Congress (Indira).
