= Suman Devi Kushwaha =

Former member of Uttar Pradesh Legislative Assembly

Suman Devi Kushwaha is an Indian politician based in Uttar Pradesh. She was elected to 15th Uttar Pradesh Legislative Assembly in 2009 via a by-election conducted in Lalitpur Assembly constituency after death of her husband Nathu Ram Kushwaha. She, like her husband was elected to Legislative Assembly as a candidate of Bahujan Samaj Party.
