= 1989 Uttar Pradesh Legislative Assembly election =

1989 Uttar Pradesh Legislative Assembly Election
- 22 November 1989

All 425 seats in the Uttar Pradesh Legislative Assembly 213 seats needed for a majority
- Registered: 79,560,897
- Turnout: 51.43%
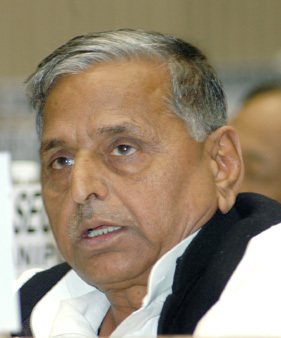

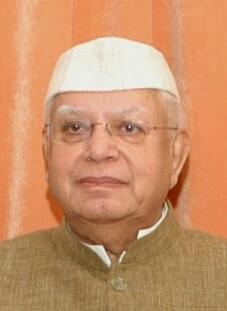

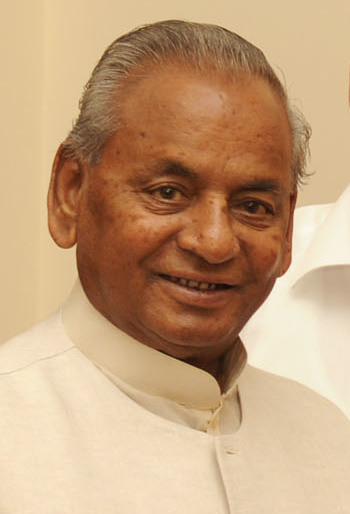
	Majority party	Minority party	Third party
Leader	Mulayam Singh Yadav	Narayan Dutt Tiwari	Kalyan Singh
Party	JD	INC(I)	BJP
Leader since	1988	1988
Leader's seat	Jaswantnagar	Haldwani	Atrauli
Last election	New	269	16
Seats won	208	94	57
Seat change	New	▼175	▲41
Popular vote	11,571,462	10,866,428	4,522,867
Percentage	29.71%	27.90%	11.61%
Swing	New	▼11.35 pp	▲1.78 pp
	Fourth party	Fifth party	Sixth party
	BSP	CPI	LKD
Leader	Kanshi Ram
Party	BSP	CPI	Lok Dal (B)
Last election	New	6	New
Seats won	13	6	2
Seat change	New	Steady	New
Popular vote	3,664,417	606,885	464,555
Percentage	9.41%	1.56%	1.19%
Swing	New	▼1.48 pp	New
Chief Minister before election
Narayan Dutt Tiwari
INC(I)
Chief Minister
Mulayam Singh Yadav
JD

Elections to the Uttar Pradesh Legislative Assembly were held in November 1989, to elect members of the 425 constituencies in Uttar Pradesh, India. The Janata Dal won the most seats as well as the popular vote and its leader, Mulayam Singh Yadav was appointed as the new Chief Minister.

After the passing of The Delimitation of Parliamentary and Assembly Constituencies Order, 1976, the number of constituencies in Uttar Pradesh was set as 425.

== Results ==
Voteshare by party
1. Janata Dal (29.7%)
2. Indian National Congress (Indira) (27.9%)
3. Bharatiya Janata Party (11.6%)
4. Bahujan Samaj Party (9.41%)
5. Communist Party of India (1.56%)
6. Lok Dal (B) (1.19%)
7. Others (3.16%)
8. Independent (15.5%)

Party	Votes	%	Seats	+/–
Janata Dal	11,571,462	29.71	208	New
Indian National Congress	10,866,428	27.90	94	–175
Bharatiya Janata Party	4,522,867	11.61	57	+41
Bahujan Samaj Party	3,664,417	9.41	13	+13
Communist Party of India	606,885	1.56	6	0
Lok Dal (B)	464,555	1.19	2	New
Janata Party (JP)	289,154	0.74	1	New
Communist Party of India (Marxist)	142,763	0.37	2	0
Shoshit Samaj Dal	71,763	0.18	1	New
Akhil Bharatiya Hindu Mahasabha	68,943	0.18	1	+1
Other Parties	655,972	1.68	0	–
Independents	6,020,921	15.46	40	+17
Total	38,946,130	100.00	425	0
Valid votes	38,946,130	95.18		
Invalid/blank votes	1,971,832	4.82		
Total votes	40,917,962	100.00		
Registered voters/turnout	79,560,897	51.43		
Source: ECI

== Elected members ==
Constituency	Reserved for (SC/ST/None)	Member	Party
Uttarkashi	SC	Barfiya Lal Junwantha	Janata Dal
Tehri	None	Balbeer Singh	Janata Dal
Deoprayag	None	Mantri Prasad Naithani	Janata Dal
Lansdowne	None	Bharat Singh Rawat	Indian National Congress
Pauri	None	Narendra Singh Bhandari	Janata Dal
Karanprayag	None	Shivanand	Indian National Congress
Badrikedar	None	Kunwar Singh Negi	Indian National Congress
Didihat	None	Kashi Singh Airy	Independent
Pithoragarh	None	Mahendra Singh Mahra	Indian National Congress
Almora	None	Saraswati Tiwari	Indian National Congress
Bageshwar	SC	Gopalram Das	Indian National Congress
Ranikhet	None	Jaswant Singh	Independent
Nainital	None	K. S. Taragi	Indian National Congress
Khatima	SC	Yash Pal	Indian National Congress
Haldwani	None	Narayan Dutt Tiwari	Indian National Congress
Kashipur	None	Karan Chandra Singh	Independent
Seohara	None	Ashok Kumar	Janata Dal
Dhampur	None	Surendra Singh	Bharatiya Janata Party
Afzalgarh	None	Suleman	Bahujan Samaj Party
Nagina	SC	Rameshwari	Bahujan Samaj Party
Nazibabad	SC	Valdeva Singh	Bahujan Samaj Party
Bijnor	None	Sukhveer Singh	Janata Dal
Chandpur	None	Tejpal	Janata Dal
Kanth	None	Chandra Pal Singh	Janata Dal
Amroha	None	Mohammad Hayat	Janata Dal
Hasanpur	None	Rifaquat Husain	Indian National Congress
Gangeshwari	SC	Jag Ram Singh	Janata Dal
Sambhal	None	Shafiqurrehman Warq	Janata Dal
Bahjoi	None	Om Prakash	Janata Dal
Chandausi	SC	Karan Singh	Bharatiya Janata Party
Kundarki	None	Chandra Vijay Singh	Janata Dal
Moradabad West	None	Sharmendra Tayagi	Janata Dal
Moradabad	None	Shami (shamim) Ahmad Khan	Janata Dal
Moradabad Rural	None	Mohd. Rizwanul Haq	Janata Dal
Thakurdwara	None	Mohammadulla Khan	Bahujan Samaj Party
Suartanda	None	Shiv Bahadur	Bharatiya Janata Party
Rampur	None	Azam Khan	Janata Dal
Bilaspur	None	Anil Kumar	Independent
Shahabad	SC	Banshidhar	Indian National Congress
Bisauli	None	Yogendra Kumar	Indian National Congress
Gunnour	None	Pushpa Devi	Indian National Congress
Sahaswan	None	Mirmazhar Ali Alias Nanhey Mian	Independent
Bilsi	SC	Daulat Ram	Janata Dal
Budaun	None	Krishna Swaroop	Bharatiya Janata Party
Usehat	None	Bhagwan Singh Shakya	Janata Dal
Binawar	None	Ram Sewak Singh	Bharatiya Janata Party
Dataganj	None	Santosh Kumari Pathak	Indian National Congress
Aonla	None	Shyam Bihari Singh	Bharatiya Janata Party
Sunha	None	Sarvaj Singh	Janata Dal
Faridpur	SC	Siyaram Sagar	Independent
Bareilly Cantonment	None	Praveen Singh Eran	Janata Dal
Bareilly City	None	Dinesh Johri	Bharatiya Janata Party
Nawabganj	None	Gedanlal Gangwar	Bharatiya Janata Party
Bhojipura	None	Narendra Pal Singh	Janata Dal
Kaber	None	Bhupendra Nath	Independent
Baheri	None	Manzoor	Independent
Pilibhit	None	Riyaaz Ahmed	Independent
Barkhera	SC	Sannu Lal	Independent
Bisalpur	None	Harish Kumar	Janata Dal
Puranpur	None	Har Narayan	Janata Dal
Powayan	SC	Chet Ram	Indian National Congress
Nigohi	None	Ahibaran	Indian National Congress
Tilhar	None	Surendra Vikram	Indian National Congress
Jalalabad	None	Ram Murti Singh	Janata Dal
Dadraul	None	Ram Autar Mishra	Indian National Congress
Shahjahanpur	None	Suresh Kumar Khanna	Bharatiya Janata Party
Mohammadi	SC	Chhotey Lal	Bharatiya Janata Party
Haiderabad	SC	Ram Kumar	Bharatiya Janata Party
Paila	None	Chheda Lal Choudhary	Indian National Congress
Lakhimpur	None	Zafar Ali Naqvi	Indian National Congress
Srinagar	None	Kamal Ahmad Rizvi	Indian National Congress
Nighasan	None	Nirvendra Kumar	Independent
Dhaurehara	None	Sarswati Pratap Sing	Indian National Congress
Behta	None	Mukhtar Anis	Janata Dal
Biswan	None	Padma Seth	Indian National Congress
Mahmoodabad	None	Raja Mohammad Amir Mohammad Khan	Indian National Congress
Sidhauli	SC	Shyam Lal Rawat	Janata Dal
Laharpur	None	Chandrakali Verma	Bharatiya Janata Party
Sitapur	None	Rajendra Kumar Gupta	Bharatiya Janata Party
Hargaon	SC	Daulatram	Bharatiya Janata Party
Misrikh	None	Om Prakash Gupta	Independent
Machhrehta	SC	Virendra Kumar Choudhary	Indian National Congress
Beniganj	SC	Ram Pal	Indian National Congress
Sandila	None	Surendra Kumar Dubey	Janata Dal
Ahirori	SC	Parmai Lal	Janata Dal
Hardoi	None	Naresh Chandra	Independent
Bawan	SC	Vipin Bihari	Janata Dal
Pihani	None	Ashok Bajpai	Janata Dal
Shahabad	None	Ram Autar Dixit	Indian National Congress
Bilgram	None	Ganga Bhakt Singh	Bharatiya Janata Party
Mallawan	None	Dharmaga	Indian National Congress
Bangarmau	None	Ashok Kumar Singh	Janata Dal
Safipur	SC	Sunder Lal	Janata Dal
Unnao	None	Manohar Lal	Janata Dal
Hadha	None	Sachchidanand	Janata Dal
Bhagwant Nagar	None	Devki Nandan	Bharatiya Janata Party
Purwa	None	Hradya Narayan	Janata Dal
Hasanganj	SC	Mast Ram	Bharatiya Janata Party
Malihabad	SC	Jagdish Chandra	Janata Dal
Mahana	None	Vinod Kumar Choudhary	Indian National Congress
Lucknow East	None	Ravidas Mehrotra	Janata Dal
Lucknow West	None	Ram Kumar Shukla	Bharatiya Janata Party
Lucknow Central	None	Basant Lal Gupta	Bharatiya Janata Party
Lucknow Cantonment	None	Premwati Tiwari	Indian National Congress
Sarojini Nagar	None	Sharda Pratap Shukla	Janata Dal
Mohanlalganj	SC	Sant Baksh Rawat	Janata Dal
Bachhrawan	SC	Shivdarshan	Indian National Congress
Tiloi	None	Hazi Mohd. Wasim	Indian National Congress
Rae Bareli	None	Ashok Kumar Singh	Janata Dal
Sataon	None	Kamal Nayan Verma	Indian National Congress
Sareni	None	Indresh Vikram	Indian National Congress
Dalmau	None	Har Narayan Singh	Indian National Congress
Salon	SC	Shiv Balak	Indian National Congress
Kunda	None	Niaz Hasan	Indian National Congress
Bihar	SC	Babu Lal Saroj	Janata Dal
Rampurkhas	None	Pramod Kumar	Indian National Congress
Garwara	None	Arun Pratap Singh	Janata Dal
Pratapgarh	None	Sangam Lal Shukl	Janata Dal
Birapur	None	Jai Singh	Indian National Congress
Patti	None	Ram Lakhan	Janata Dal
Amethi	None	Haricharan Yadav	Indian National Congress
Gauriganj	None	Rajpati Devi	Indian National Congress
Jagdishpur	SC	Ram Sewak	Indian National Congress
Isauli	None	Indra Bhadra	Janata Dal
Sultanpur	None	Muid Ahmad	Indian National Congress
Jaisinghpur	None	Surya Bhan Singh	Janata Dal
Chanda	None	Ashok Kumar Pandey	Janata Dal
Kadipur	SC	Jai Raj Gautam	Indian National Congress
Katehari	None	Ravindra Nath Tewari	Janata Dal
Akbarpur	None	Akbar Husain Babar	Communist Party of India
Jalalpur	None	Ramlakhan Verma	Bahujan Samaj Party
Jahangirganj	SC	Arun	Janata Dal
Tanda	None	Gopi Nath Verma	Janata Dal
Ayodhya	None	Jai Shankar Pande	Janata Dal
Bikapur	None	Sant Shri Ramdivedi	Independent
Milkipur	None	Brij Bhusan Mani Tripathi	Indian National Congress
Sohawal	SC	Audhesh Prasad	Janata Dal
Rudauli	None	Pradeep Kumar Yadav	Janata Dal
Dariyabad	SC	Rajiv Kumar Singh	Indian National Congress
Siddhaur	None	Ratan Lal Alias Deena	Janata Dal
Haidergarh	None	Sunder Lal	Bharatiya Janata Party
Masauli	None	Beni Prasad	Janata Dal
Nawabganj	None	Ram Chandra Bakhtha Singh	Communist Party of India
Fatehpur	SC	Hardev Singh	Janata Dal
Ramnagar	None	Shiv Karan Singh	Indian National Congress
Kaiserganj	None	Ram Tej	Lok Dal
Fakharpur	None	Bhayankar Singh	Bharatiya Janata Party
Mahsi	None	Indra Pratap Singh	Indian National Congress
Nanpara	None	Devta Din	Janata Dal
Charda	SC	Devi Prasad	Janata Dal
Bhinga	None	Chandramani Singh	Independent
Bahraich	None	Dharmpal	Indian National Congress
Ikauna	SC	Vishnu Dayal	Bharatiya Janata Party
Gainsari	None	Aqbal Hasan Alias Aqbal Husain	Indian National Congress
Tulsipur	None	Rizwan Zaheer Alias Rizzu	Independent
Balrampur	None	Hanumant Singh	Bharatiya Janata Party
Utraula	None	Samiulla	Independent
Sadullah Nagar	None	Dashrath Singh	Bharatiya Janata Party
Mankapur	SC	Ram Vishnu Azad	Indian National Congress
Mujehna	None	Rampal Singh	Indian National Congress
Gonda	None	Raghuraj Prasad Upadhyay	Indian National Congress
Katra Bazar	None	Murli Dhar Muneem	Indian National Congress
Colonelganj	None	Ajai Pratap Singh Alias Lalla Bhaiya	Independent
Dixir	SC	Ramapati Shastri	Bharatiya Janata Party
Harraiya	None	Surender Pratap Narayan	Indian National Congress
Captainganj	None	Krishan Kinkar Singh	Independent
Nagar East	SC	Ram Karan Arya	Janata Dal
Basti	None	Rajmani Pandey	Janata Dal
Ramnagar	None	Ram Lalit	Janata Dal
Domariaganj	None	Prem Prakash Alias Jippi Tiwari	Bharatiya Janata Party
Itwa	None	Mata Prasad Pandey	Janata Dal
Shohratgarh	None	Kamal Sahni	Indian National Congress
Naugarh	None	Mohammad Sayed Bhramar	Lok Dal
Bansi	None	Jai Pratap Singh	Independent
Khesraha	None	Diwakar Vikram Singh	Janata Dal
Menhdawal	None	Chander Shekhar Singh	Bharatiya Janata Party
Khalilabad	None	Ram Asray Paswan	Janata Dal
Hainsarbazar	SC	Sri Ram Chauhan	Bharatiya Janata Party
Bansgaon	SC	Mithai Lal Shastri	Bharatiya Janata Party
Dhuriapar	SC	Markandey Chand	Janata Dal
Chillupar	None	Hari Shankar Tiwari	Indian National Congress
Kauriram	None	Gauri Devi	Janata Dal
Mundera Bazar	SC	Sharda Devi	Janata Dal
Pipraich	None	Kedar Nath Singh	Janata Dal
Gorakhpur	None	Shiv Pratap Shukla	Bharatiya Janata Party
Maniram	None	Om Prakash	Hindu Mahasabha
Sahjanwa	None	Sharda Prasad Rawat	Janata Dal
Paniara	None	Ganpat Singh	Independent
Pharenda	None	Shyam Narayan	Indian National Congress
Luxmipur	None	Amar Mani	Indian National Congress
Siswa	None	Jagdish Lal	Janata Dal
Maharajganj	SC	Keshav Prasad	Janata Dal
Shyamdeurwa	None	Janardan Prasad Ojha	Janata Dal
Naurangia	SC	Purnvasi	Independent
Ramkola	None	Madan Govind Rao	Janata Dal
Hata	SC	Kripa Shankar Arya	Janata Dal
Padrauna	None	Asgar	Communist Party of India
Seorahi	None	Qasim	Independent
Fazilnagar	None	Vishwanath	Janata Dal
Kasia	None	Brahma Shankar	Janata Dal
Gauri Bazar	None	Laljhari	Independent
Rudrapur	None	Bhukti Nath	Janata Dal
Deoria	None	Ram Chhabila	Janata Dal
Bhatpar Rani	None	Harivansh Sahai	Janata Dal
Salempur	None	Suresh Yadav	Janata Dal
Barhaj	None	Swami Nath	Independent
Nathupur	None	Amresh Chandra	Indian National Congress
Ghosi	None	Subhash	Indian National Congress
Sagri	None	Panchanan	Indian National Congress
Gopalpur	None	Gomti	Independent
Azamgarh	None	Durga Prasad Yadav	Janata Dal
Nizamabad	None	Ram Bachan	Indian National Congress
Atraulia	None	Balram Yadav	Janata Dal
Phulpur	None	Ramakant	Bahujan Samaj Party
Saraimir	SC	Dayaram Bhaskar	Bahujan Samaj Party
Mehnagar	SC	Deep Narain	Indian National Congress
Lalganj	None	Shree Prakash	Janata Dal
Mubarakpur	None	Yashwant	Janata Dal
Muhammadabad Gohna	SC	Faujdar	Bahujan Samaj Party
Mau	None	Mobin	Bahujan Samaj Party
Rasra	SC	Ram Bachan	Indian National Congress
Siar	None	Sharda Nand Anchal	Janata Dal
Chilkahar	None	Ramgovind Chaudhari	Janata Dal
Sikanderpur	None	Rajbhari	Janata Party
Bansdih	None	Vijai Laxmi	Janata Dal
Doaba	None	Bhola Nath	Indian National Congress
Ballia	None	Vikramditya	Janata Dal
Kopachit	None	Gauri Shankar Baiya	Janata Dal
Zahoorabad	None	Virender Singh	Indian National Congress
Mohammadabad	None	Afzaal Ansari	Communist Party of India
Dildarnagar	None	Om Prakash	Janata Dal
Zamania	None	Ravinder Kumar Singh	Independent
Ghazipur	None	Khursheed	Independent
Jakhania	SC	Rajnath Sonkar (shastri)	Janata Dal
Sadat	SC	Ramdhani	Independent
Saidpur	None	Rajeet	Janata Dal
Dhanapur	None	Daya Shankar	Janata Dal
Chandauli	SC	Chhannu Lal	Janata Dal
Chakiya	SC	Satya Prakash Sonkra	Janata Dal
Mughalsarai	None	Ganji Prasad	Independent
Varanasi Cantonment	None	Shatrudra Prakash	Janata Dal
Varanasi South	None	Shyam Dev Rai Choudhary (dada)	Bharatiya Janata Party
Varanasi North	None	Amarnath Yadav	Bharatiya Janata Party
Chiraigaon	None	Chander Shekhar	Janata Dal
Kolasla	None	Udail	Communist Party of India
Gangapur	None	Raj Kishore	Communist Party of India
Aurai	None	Nihala Singh	Janata Dal
Gyanpur	None	Ramrati Wind	Janata Dal
Bhadohi	SC	Mool Chand	Janata Dal
Barsathi	None	Paras Nath Yadav	Janata Dal
Mariahu	None	Savitri Devi	Janata Dal
Kerakat	SC	Raj Pati	Janata Dal
Bayalsi	None	Uma Nath Singh	Bharatiya Janata Party
Jaunpur	None	Arjun Singh Yadav	Independent
Rari	None	Arun Kumar Singh 'muna'	Indian National Congress
Shahganj	SC	Deep Chand	Janata Dal
Khutahan	None	Lalta Prasad Yadav	Janata Dal
Garwara	None	Rai Luxmi Narain Singh	Janata Dal
Machhlishahr	None	Jwala Prasad Yadav	Janata Dal
Dudhi	SC	Vijay Singh	Independent
Robertsganj	SC	Tirath Raj	Bharatiya Janata Party
Rajgarh	None	Gulab Singh	Bharatiya Janata Party
Chunar	None	Yadunath Singh	Janata Dal
Majhwa	None	Rudra Prasad	Janata Dal
Mirzapur	None	Sarjeet Singh Dang	Bharatiya Janata Party
Chhanbey	SC	Kali Charan	Janata Dal
Meja	SC	Vishram Das	Janata Dal
Karchana	None	Kunwar Revati Raman Singh	Janata Dal
Bara	None	Ram Dular Singh	Janata Dal
Jhusi	None	Mahender Pratap Singh	Janata Dal
Handia	None	Rakesh Dhar Tripathi	Janata Dal
Pratappur	None	Rajender Tripathi	Janata Dal
Soraon	None	Bhola Singh	Janata Dal
Nawabganj	None	Nazam Uddin	Bahujan Samaj Party
Allahabad North	None	Anugrah Narayan Singh	Janata Dal
Allahabad South	None	Keshari Nath Tripathi	Bharatiya Janata Party
Allahabad West	None	Atik Ahmad	Independent
Chail	SC	Shailender Kumar	Indian National Congress
Manjhanpur	SC	Ishwar Sharan Vidharthi	Indian National Congress
Sirathu	SC	Radhey Shyam Bhartiya	Janata Dal
Khaga	None	Veer Abhimanyu Singh	Janata Dal
Kishunpur	SC	Jageshwar	Janata Dal
Haswa	None	Uma Kant Bajpai	Independent
Fatehpur	None	Syed Liyaqat Husain	Janata Dal
Jahanabad	None	Naresh Chandra Uttam	Janata Dal
Bindki	None	Achal Singh	Janata Dal
Aryanagar	None	Reshma Arif	Janata Dal
Sisamau	SC	Shiv Kumar Baria	Janata Dal
Generalganj	None	Virendra Nath Dexit	Janata Dal
Kanpur Cantonment	None	Ganesh Dixit	Janata Dal
Govind Nagar	None	Bal Chandra Mishra	Bharatiya Janata Party
Kalyanpur	None	Bhoodhar Narain Misra	Janata Dal
Sarsaul	None	Jaohari Lal Trivedi	Janata Dal
Ghatampur	None	Agnihotri Ram Asrey	Janata Dal
Bhognipur	SC	Pyare Lal Snakhar	Janata Dal
Rajpur	None	Ram Swarup Varma	Shoshit Samaj Dal
Sarvankhera	None	Prabhu Dayal	Janata Dal
Chaubepur	None	Hari Kishan	Janata Dal
Bilhaur	SC	Motilal Dehalvi	Janata Dal
Derapur	None	Bhagwandin Kushwaha	Janata Dal
Auraiya	None	Ravinder Singh Chauhan	Indian National Congress
Ajitmal	SC	Munshi Lal	Janata Dal
Lakhna	SC	Gaya Prasad Verma	Janata Dal
Etawah	None	Sukhda Mishra	Janata Dal
Jaswantnagar	None	Mulayam Singh Yadav	Janata Dal
Bharthana	None	Maharaj Singh Yadav	Janata Dal
Bidhuna	None	Dhaniram Verma	Janata Dal
Kannauj	SC	Kaliyan Singh Dohare	Janata Dal
Umarda	None	Ram Baksh Verma	Janata Dal
Chhibramau	None	Kaptan Singh	Janata Dal
Kamalganj	None	Anwar Mohammad Khan	Janata Dal
Farrukhabad	None	Vimal Prasad Tiwari	Indian National Congress
Kaimganj	None	Fakirey Lal Verma	Independent
Mohammdabad	None	Suresh Chander Singh Yadav	Janata Dal
Manikpur	SC	Siya Dulari	Indian National Congress
Karwi	None	Ram Prasad Singh	Communist Party of India
Baberu	None	Devkumar Yadav	Indian National Congress
Tindwari	None	Chander Bhan Singh	Janata Dal
Banda	None	Jamuna Prasad Bose	Janata Dal
Naraini	None	Surender Pal Verma	Communist Party of India
Hamirpur	None	Ashok Kumar Chandel	Independent
Maudaha	None	Yuvraj	Indian National Congress
Rath	None	Rajender Singh	Janata Dal
Charkhari	SC	Kashi Prasad	Janata Dal
Mahoba	None	Babu Lal	Indian National Congress
Mehroni	None	Devender Kumar Singh	Bharatiya Janata Party
Lalitpur	None	Arvind Kumar	Bharatiya Janata Party
Jhansi	None	Ravindra Shukla	Bharatiya Janata Party
Babina	SC	Ratan Lal	Bharatiya Janata Party
Mauranipur	None	Pragi Lal	Bharatiya Janata Party
Garautha	None	Raanjit Singh Jubev	Indian National Congress
Konch	SC	Chain Sukh Bharti	Bahujan Samaj Party
Orai	None	Akbar Ali	Bahujan Samaj Party
Kalpi	None	Ch. Shanker Singh	Janata Dal
Madhogarh	None	Shiv Ram	Bahujan Samaj Party
Bhongara	None	Shivraj Singh Chauhan	Bharatiya Janata Party
Kishni	SC	Rameshwar Dayal Balmiki	Janata Dal
Karhal	None	Babu Ram Yadav	Janata Dal
Shikohabad	None	Rakesh Kumar	Independent
Jasrana	None	Raghunath Singh Verma Patel	Indian National Congress
Ghiror	None	Jagmohan Singh Yadav	Janata Dal
Mainpuri	None	Indal Singh Chauhan	Janata Dal
Aliganj	None	Laturi Singh	Indian National Congress
Patiyali	None	Devender Singh	Indian National Congress
Sakeet	None	Virender Singh	Janata Dal
Soron	None	Omkar Singh	Bharatiya Janata Party
Kasganj	None	Goverdhan Singh	Janata Dal
Etah	None	Atar Singh Yadav	Janata Dal
Nidhauli Kalan	None	Anil Kumar Singh Yadav	Indian National Congress
Jalesar	SC	Madhav	Bharatiya Janata Party
Firozabad	None	Raghubar Dayal Verma	Janata Dal
Bah	None	Aridaman Singh	Janata Dal
Fatehabad	None	Bahadur Singh	Janata Dal
Tundla	SC	Om Prakash Diwakar	Janata Dal
Etmadpur	SC	Chandra Bhan Maurya	Janata Dal
Dayalbagh	None	Vijay Singh Rana	Janata Dal
Agra Cantonment	None	Hardwar Dube	Bharatiya Janata Party
Agra East	None	Satya Prakash Vikal	Bharatiya Janata Party
Agra West	SC	Kishan Gopal	Bharatiya Janata Party
Kheragarh	None	Mandleshwar Singh	Janata Dal
Fatehpur Sikri	None	Badan Singh	Janata Dal
Goverdhan	SC	Gyanendra Swaroop	Janata Dal
Mathura	None	Ravi Kant Garg	Bharatiya Janata Party
Chhata	None	Kishori Shyam	Bharatiya Janata Party
Mat	None	Shyam Sunder Sharma	Indian National Congress
Gokul	None	Sardar Singh	Janata Dal
Sadabad	None	Mustemand Ali Khan	Janata Dal
Hathras	None	Ram Saran Singh	Janata Dal
Sasni	SC	Ramesh Karan	Janata Dal
Sikandara Rao	None	Suresh Pratap Gandhi	Janata Dal
Gangiri	None	Babu Singh	Janata Dal
Atrauli	None	Kalyan Singh	Bharatiya Janata Party
Aligarh	None	Krashan Kumar Navaman	Bharatiya Janata Party
Koil	SC	Ram Prasad Deshmukh	Indian National Congress
Iglas	None	Vijendra Singh	Indian National Congress
Barauli	None	Surendra Singh Chauhan	Indian National Congress
Khair	None	Jagvir Singh	Janata Dal
Jewar	SC	Aidal Singh	Janata Dal
Khurja	None	Ravindra Raghav Alias Pappan	Janata Dal
Debai	None	Nem Pal	Janata Dal
Anupshahr	None	Hoshiyar	Janata Dal
Siana	None	Imtiaz Mohammad Khan	Indian National Congress
Agota	None	Kiran Pal Singh	Janata Dal
Bulandshahr	None	Dharam Pal	Janata Dal
Shikarpur	SC	Ganga Ram	Janata Dal
Sikandrabad	None	Narendra Singh	Janata Dal
Dadri	None	Mahendra Singh Bhati	Janata Dal
Ghaziabad	None	Surendra Kumar Alias Munni	Indian National Congress
Muradnagar	None	Raj Pal Tyagi	Independent
Modinagar	None	Sukhbir Singh Gahlot	Janata Dal
Hapur	SC	Gajraj Singh	Indian National Congress
Garhmukteshwar	None	Akhatar	Indian National Congress
Kithore	None	Parwez Khan	Janata Dal
Hastinapur	SC	Jhaggad Singh	Janata Dal
Sardhana	None	Amar Pal	Bharatiya Janata Party
Meerut Cantonment	None	Pramatma Sharan Mittal	Bharatiya Janata Party
Meerut	None	Lakshmi Kant Vajpai	Bharatiya Janata Party
Kharkhauda	None	Parbhu Dayal	Janata Dal
Siwalkhas	SC	Charan Singh	Janata Dal
Khekra	None	Richhpal Singh Bansal	Janata Dal
Baghpat	None	Sahab Singh	Janata Dal
Barnawa	None	Bhopal Singh	Janata Dal
Chhaprauli	None	Narender Singh	Janata Dal
Kandhla	None	Virender Singh	Janata Dal
Khatauli	None	Dharamveer Singh	Janata Dal
Jansath	SC	Mahaveer	Janata Dal
Morna	None	Anir Alam Khan	Janata Dal
Muzaffarnagar	None	Somansh Prakash	Janata Dal
Charthawal	SC	G. S. Vinod	Janata Dal
Baghra	None	Harender Singh	Janata Dal
Kairana	None	Rajeshwar Bansal	Independent
Thana Bhawan	None	Nakli Singh	Indian National Congress
Nakur	None	Kanwarpal	Janata Dal
Sarsawa	None	Ram Sharan	Janata Dal
Nagal	SC	Harphool Singh	Janata Dal
Deoband	None	Mahavir Singh Rana	Indian National Congress
Harora	SC	Bimla Rakesh	Janata Dal
Saharanpur	None	Virender Singh	Janata Dal
Muzaffarabad	None	Mohammad Aslam Khan	Janata Dal
Roorkee	None	Ram Singh Saini	Indian National Congress
Lhaksar	None	Kazi Mohd. Mohiuddin	Indian National Congress
Hardwar	None	Virender Singh	Janata Dal
Mussoorie	None	Ranjit Singh	Independent
Dehra Dun	None	Harbhansh Kapur	Bharatiya Janata Party
Chakrata	ST	Gulab Singh	Indian National Congress
