= Minapur Assembly constituency =

Coordinates: 26°20′07″N 85°36′06″E

Minapur
- Constituency No. 90 for the Bihar Legislative Assembly

Constituency details
- Country: India
- Region: East India
- State: Bihar
- District: Muzaffarpur
- Established: 1951
- Total electors: 282,903

Member of Legislative Assembly
- 18th Bihar Legislative Assembly
- Incumbent Ajay Kushwaha
- Party: JD(U)
- Alliance: NDA
- Elected year: 2025

Minapur is an assembly constituency in Muzaffarpur district in the Indian state of Bihar.

== Overview ==
As per Delimitation of Parliamentary and Assembly constituencies Order, 2008, No. 90 Minapur Assembly constituency is composed of the following: Minapur community development block; Garha, Jhaphan, Kafen Chaudhary, Narkatiya, Narma, Patiyasa and Rampur Jaipal gram panchayats of Bochahan CD Block.

Minapur Assembly constituency is part of No. 16 Vaishali (Lok Sabha constituency).

== Members of the Legislative Assembly ==
Year	Name	Party
1952	Janak Singh	Indian National Congress
1957	Janak Singh	Indian National Congress
1962	Janak Singh	Indian National Congress
1967	Mahanth Ramkishore Das	Samyukta Socialist Party
1969	Janak Singh	Indian National Congress
1972	Mahanth Ramkishore Das	Indian National Congress
1977	Nagendra Prasad Kushwaha	Janata Party
1980	Janakdhari Prasad Kushwaha	Communist Party of India
1985	Hind Keshari Yadav	Lokdal
1990	Hind Keshari Yadav	Janata Dal
1995	Hind Keshari Yadav	Janata Dal
2000	Dinesh Prasad Kushwaha	Independent politician
2005	Hind Keshari Yadav	Rashtriya Janata Dal
2005	Dinesh Prasad Kushwaha	Janata Dal (United)
2010	Dinesh Prasad Kushwaha	Janata Dal (United)
2015	Munna Yadav	Rashtriya Janata Dal
2020	Munna Yadav	Rashtriya Janata Dal
2025	Ajay Kushwaha	Janata Dal (United)

== Election results ==
=== 2025 ===
2025 Bihar Legislative Assembly election: Minapur
Party	Candidate	Votes	%	±%
JD(U)	Ajay Kumar	113,411	51.59	+26.74
RJD	Munna Yadav	79,173	36.01	+2.5
JSP	Tej Narayan Sahni	6,633	3.02	
BSP	Kumar Pushpendra	3,162	1.44	
Independent	Sanjiv Chaudhri	2,654	1.21	
Independent	Santosh Kumar	2,179	0.99	+0.02
NOTA	None of the above	7,805	3.55	+2.87
Majority		34,238	15.58	+6.92
Turnout		219,843	77.71	+12.45
JD(U) gain from RJD		Swing		

=== 2020 ===
2020 Bihar Legislative Assembly election: Minapur
Party	Candidate	Votes	%	±%
RJD	Munna Yadav	60,018	33.51	−16.09
JD(U)	Manoj Kumar	44,506	24.85	
LJP	Ajay Kumar	43,496	24.28	
Independent	Ramesh Kumar	4,086	2.28	
JAP(L)	Veena Yadav	3,718	2.08	+1.5
Bhartiya Panchyat Party	Santosh Shahi	3,047	1.7	
Independent	Kanchan Sahni	2,521	1.41	
Independent	Mukesh Kumar Ranjan	2,219	1.24	
Independent	Lalita Kumari	2,204	1.23	
RLSP	Prabhu Kushwaha	2,059	1.15	
Jai Maha Bharath Party	Akhileshwar Singh	1,988	1.11	
Independent	Santosh Kumar	1,736	0.97	
NOTA	None of the above	1,216	0.68	−1.0
Majority		15,512	8.66	−6.04
Turnout		179,124	65.26	+0.43
Munna Yadav gain from Manoj Kumar		Swing		

=== 2015 ===
2015 Bihar Legislative Assembly election: Minapur
Party	Candidate	Votes	%	±%
RJD	Rajeev Kumar Urf Munna Yadav	80,790	49.6	
BJP	Ajay Kumar	56,850	34.9	
Independent	Md. Sadrul Khan	4,934	3.03	
Independent	Rakesh Kumar	4,292	2.64	
CPI	Lakshmi Kant	2,743	1.68	
BSP	Rani Devi	2,099	1.29	
Independent	Jitendra Prasad	1,655	1.02	
NOTA	None of the above	2,730	1.68	
Majority		23,940	14.7	
Turnout		162,872	64.83	
