= Dinesh Prasad =

Indian politician

Bihar Legislative Assembly
- Preceded by: Hind Keshari Yadav
- Constituency: Minapur (Vidhan Sabha constituency)
- Succeeded by: Rajeev Kumar Yadav Urf Munna Yadav

Personal details
- Born: Minapur (Vidhan Sabha constituency), Muzaffarpur Bihar
- Party: Janata Dal (United)

Dinesh Prasad also known as Dinesh Prasad Kushwaha is an Indian politician from Bihar. He was the member of the Bihar Legislative Assembly from Minapur Muzaffarpur 3 times. From 2008 to 2010 he also served as Bihar's irrigation minister.

== Political career ==
Dinesh Prasad started his political journey with left ideology and wins his first election as an independent candidate and after that he joined Janata Dal (United).
