= Bhagwandin Kushwaha =

Former member of Uttar Pradesh Legislative Assembly

Member of Uttar Pradesh Legislative Assembly
- In office 1977–1991
- Constituency: Derapur
- Succeeded by: Devendra Singh

Personal details
- Born: 1941 (age 84–85)
- Party: Janata Dal

Bhagwandin Kushwaha was an Indian politician from Uttar Pradesh, who was elected to Uttar Pradesh Legislative Assembly four times from the Derapur Assembly constituency of the Kanpur Dehat district. He was a socialist leader who served as a member of several political parties founded on the ideology of socialism. These included Lok Dal, Janata Dal, Janata Party and Janata Party (Secular).

== Life and political career ==
Kushwaha was a resident of Sithmara village of the Derapur block, located in Kanpur Dehat district of Uttar Pradesh. He started his political career as the village head. Born to Lalta Prasad Kushwaha in the year 1941, he was reported to be a ground level leader, who liked to work between the people. On 14 March 1957, he was married to Sushila Devi.

He entered the state level politics in the year 1977, when he was elected to Uttar Pradesh Legislative Assembly for the first time on the symbol of Janata Party. He defeated Ram Pal Singh Yadav, who was the runner up candidate and contested in this election as a member of Indian National Congress. In 1980 elections, Kushwaha became a member of Janata Party (Secular) led by Charan Singh. He defeated Nek Chand Pandey of Indian National Congress and was elected to the legislative assembly for the second time. In 1985, he became the MLA for the third time by defeating Ram Narain Tripathi of Indian National Congress. In the 1985 elections, Kushwaha contested as a candidate of Lok Dal.He reached the peak of his political career in 1989 by defeating Chaudhary Ram Pal Singh of Indian National Congress and becoming the MLA for fourth time from Derapur Assembly constituency. In the 1989 elections, he was a member of Janata Dal political party.

In the 1991 elections, the political career of Kushwaha witnessed a downfall. He was pushed to third position in this election with Devendra Singh of Bharatiya Janata Party retaining the Derapur seat and Janata Party candidate Ram Das Pal becoming the runner-up. Kushwaha contested as Janata Dal candidate in this election.
