= Surendra Kumar Kushwaha =

Indian politician

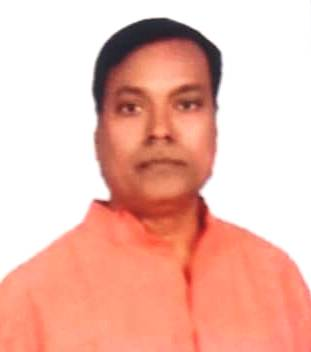

Member of the Uttar Pradesh Legislative Assembly
- In office 2022–Present
- Constituency: Fazilnagar Assembly constituency

Personal details
- Party: Bharatiya Janata Party

Surendra Kumar Kushwaha is a Member of Uttar Pradesh Legislative Assembly from Fazilnagar Assembly constituency. He was elected to Uttar Pradesh Legislature as a candidate of Bhartiya Janata Party in 2022 Assembly elections. Kushwaha defeated Swami Prasad Maurya of Samajwadi Party in this election. Kushwaha, who was a teacher in earlier part of his life, before becoming a Member of Legislative Assembly, was employed in the Pawanagar Mahavir Inter college (Kushinagar), as a teacher of Social Studies.
