= Koeri =

Caste community of India

- Classification: Other Backward Class
- Religions: Hinduism, Buddhism
- Languages: Bhojpuri, Magahi, Awadhi, Hindi-Urdu
- Country: India and Nepal
- Region: Bihar, Uttar Pradesh, Jharkhand, Madhesh

The Koeri (spelt as Koiry or Koiri), also referred to as Kushwaha and more recently self-described as Maurya in several parts of northern India are an Indian non-elite caste, found largely in Bihar and Uttar Pradesh, whose traditional occupation was agriculture. According to Arvind Narayan Das, they were horticulturists rather than agriculturists. They are also recorded as performing the work of Mahajan (rural moneylenders) in credit market of rural parts of Bihar and Bengal in the 1880s. Koeris have attempted Sanskritisation— as part of social resurgence. During the British rule in India, Koeris were described as "agriculturalists" along with Kurmis and other cultivating castes. They are described as a dominant caste in various opinions.

Bihar's land reform drive of 1950s benefitted the groups like Koeris, and they were able to consolidate their landholdings at the cost of big landlords, whose possession witnessed a liquidation. It is argued that these reforms weren't percolated down to the most vulnerable groups in agrarian society, the Scheduled Castes, but the traditional agrarian relations based on caste did witness some changes. In the backdrop of this change many new landlords of post reform period hailed from groups like Koeris. In post-independence India, Koeris have been classified as Upper Backwards by virtue of being part of the group of four of the OBC communities in Bihar, who acquired land overtime, adopted improved agricultural technology and attained political power to become a class of rising Kulaks in the agricultural society of India. In some of the districts of Bihar, they have also participated in the Naxalite–Maoist insurgency against the feudal order. In parts of northern India, they, besides Yadavs, Jats and Kurmis, are considered as largest politically organised peasant community.

The Koeris are found in Saran district and are also distributed more heterogeneously across Munger, Banka, Khagaria, Samastipur, East Champaran, West Champaran and Bhojpur district. Outside India, the Koeris are distributed among the Bihari diaspora in Mauritius where they were taken as indentured labourers. They also have a significant population residing in Nepal.

In 1977, the government of Bihar introduced an affirmative action of quota in government jobs and universities which has benefitted the backward castes like the Koeris. They are classified as a “Backward caste” or “Other Backwards Caste” under the Indian government's system of positive discrimination.

== Sanskritisation ==
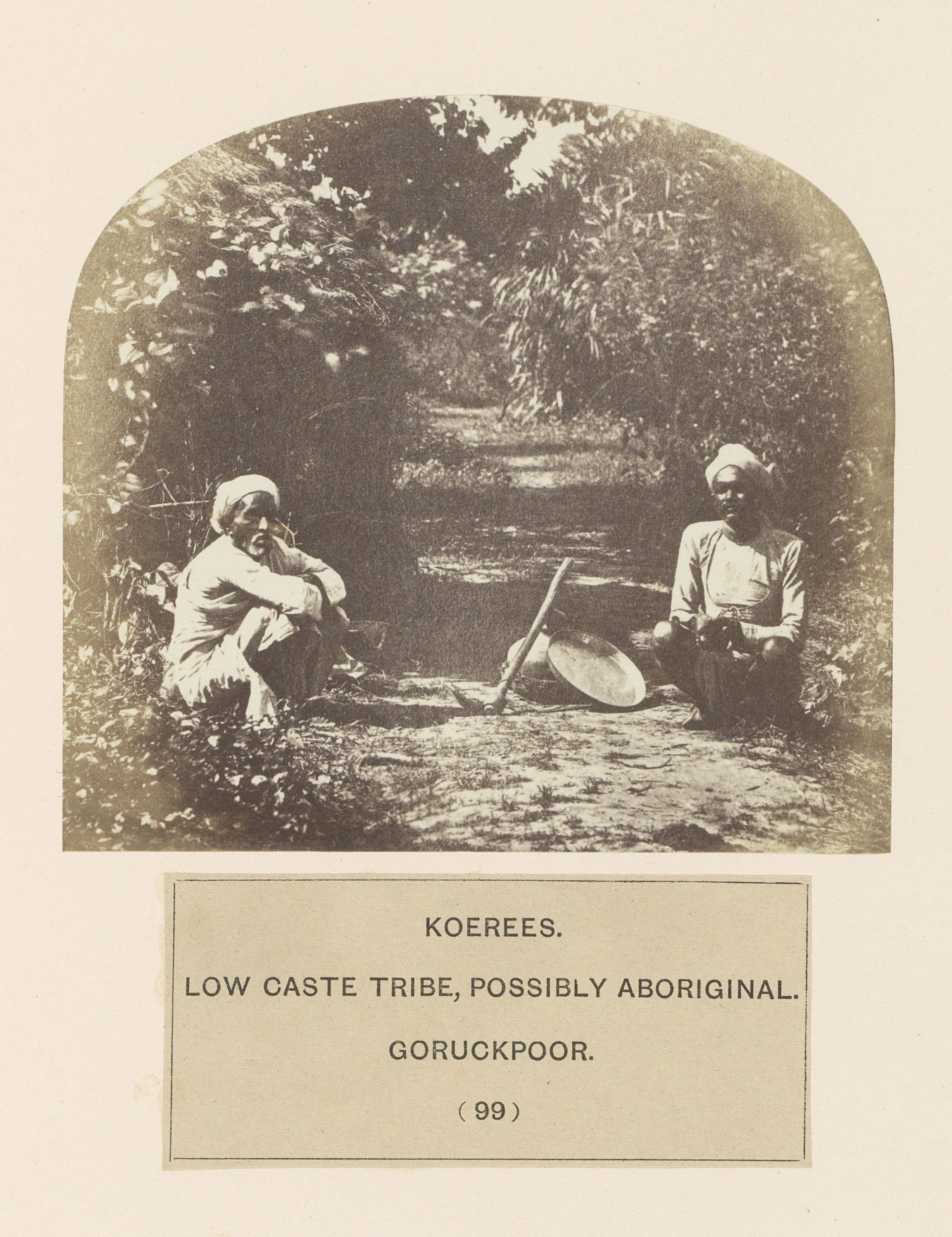
British era image of two men from Koeri caste describing low caste and possibility of aboriginal origin.

Haruka Yanagisawa, Professor Emeritus of the University of Tokyo mentions in his work that Koeris along with Yadav and Kurmis were classified as upper-middle caste, who were known for their sturdy and hardy nature. Koeris have traditionally been classified as a “shudra“ caste and today Koeris have attempted Sanskritisation—the attempt by traditionally middle and low castes to rise up the social ladder, often by tracing their origins to mythical characters or following the lifestyle of higher varna, such as following vegetarianism, secluding women, or wearing Janeu, the sacred thread. The Sanskritising trend in castes of northern India, including that of the Koeris, was inspired by the vaishnavite tradition, as attested by their bid to seek association with avatars of Vishnu. Author William Pinch wrote:

"The nineteenth century antecedents of the Kushvaha- kshatriya movement reveal distinct cosmological associations with Shiva and his divine consort, Parvati. Kushvaha-kshatriya identity was espoused by agricultural community well known throughout the Gangetic north for an expertise in vegetable and (to an increasingly limited scale after the turn of twentieth century) poppy cultivation. Prominent among them were Kachhi and Murao agriculturalist of central Uttar Pradesh ,Kachhvahas of western Uttar Pradesh and Koiris of Bihar and eastern Uttar Pradesh."

Kushwaha Kshatriya Mahasabha, the caste association of Koeris, held its first session in 1922.

Some Kushwaha reformers like Ganga Prasad Gupta in Banaras argued the Koeris descended from Kusha and that they served Raja Jayachandra in their military capacity during the period of Muslim consolidation under Shuhabuddin Ghuri. He argued further that after defeat, the fear of persecution at the hands of Muslims caused the Kusvaha Kshatriya to flee into the forest in disarray and discard their sacred threads, so as not to appear as erstwhile defenders of Hinduism. The British ethnographer Herbert Hope Risley recorded various Koeri origin myths in the 1890s. According to one of them, Shiva and Parvati created Koeri and Kachhi to take care of vegetables and their flower gardens in Banaras. Writing eighty years later, Francis Buchanan-Hamilton records that Koeris of Bihar were followers of Dashanami Sampradaya while those of Gorakhpur and Ayodhya looked towards Ramanandi saints for spiritual guidance.

According to Christophe Jaffrelot, the caste associations were formed with the basic objective of unifying individual castes. The All India Kushwaha Kshatriya Mahasabha was formed to bring the horticulturist and market gardener communities like the Koeri, the Kachhi and the Murao under one umbrella. The Koeris also attempted to forge a caste coalition called Raghav Samaj, backed by kurmis which was named after one of Rama's names. This was done to justify the communities' claims of descent from Lava and Kusha, respectively. In 1928, the Mahasabha also petitioned the Simon Commission on behalf of various subcastes of the Koeri community to seek recognition as Kshatriya.

The terminology Lav-Kush for the Koeri-Kurmi community became more important in politics than in culture; in Bihar, it came to represent the political solidarity of the Koeri and Kurmi castes.

In context of the communal riots related to cow protectionism, some writers are also of the opinion that low castes groups like Koeri, Ahirs also took to cow protection for asserting higher social status since cow already had symbolic importance in Hinduism. This particular view of cow protection was different from the UP's urban elites.

== Economy ==
The community was at the heart of the Indian opium trade, which had its main base in Bihar. For many years the British East India Company via an agency in Patna regulated and exploited it. Carl Trocki believes that. "Opium cultivators were not free agents" and describes the coercion and financial arrangements that were involved to achieve production, which included restricting land to that product even when the people needed grain because of famine. Although profitable for the company, it was often not so for the peasant producer, and, "Only one particular caste, the Koeris, managed to carry on the cultivation with some degree of efficiency. They were able to do this because they could employ their wives and children to help out with the tasks of opium production."

Other groups involved in opium production had to hire labour, but the Koeris cut costs by utilising that available within their own family. Describing the industrious nature of the Koeri people, Susan Bayly wrote:

"By the mid-nineteenth century, influential revenue specialists were reporting that they could tell the caste of a landed man by simply glancing at his crops. In the north, these observers claimed, a field of 'second-rate barley' would belong to a Rajput or Brahman who took pride in shunning the plough and secluding his womenfolk. Such a man was to be blamed for his own decline, fecklessly mortgaging and then selling off his lands to maintain his unproductive dependents. By the same logic, a flourishing field of wheat would belong to a non-twice-born tiller, wheat being a crop requiring skill and enterprise on the part of the cultivator. These, said such commentators as Denzil Ibbetson and E. A. H. Blunt, were the qualities of the non-patrician 'peasant' – the thrifty Jat or canny Kurmi in upper India, .... Similar virtues would be found among the smaller market-gardening populations, these being the people known as Koeris in Hindustan"

Colonial ethnographers like Dr. Hunter identified Koiris and Oudhia Kurmis as most respectable of all cultivating castes in some districts of Bihar.

In 1877, there was an attempt by colonial Government of Bengal to prepare an account of Indian society and it culminated into the process of all india social classification of various castes and tribes beginning with the first census of 1871. In 1901, Herbert Hope Risley applied anthropometrical methods to develop a racial taxonomy of Indian society leading to a problematic attempt to classify people of India. The Koeris were classified as "agricultural caste" along with the Kurmis. An official report of 1941 described them as being the "most advanced" cultivators in Bihar and said, "Simple in habits, thrifty to a degree and a master in the art of market-gardening, the Koeri is amongst the best of the tillers of the soil to be found anywhere in India." During the colonial period, in the provinces such as Bengal, although majority of rural population was having a living from the agriculture, only a few of them deserved classification as "agriculturists". The Koeris along with the Kachhis and the Kurmis were not only the major "agricultural caste", but were also reputed as most skilled cultivators. As per the description of William Crooke of the contemporary agrarian society, the Koeris were 'quiet, industrious and well-behaved people'.

In the early 19th century in the Gaya district, Koeris were recorded by Francis Buchanan as a community of "ploughing tribes" consisting primarily of poor and middle peasants. It was however noted that in his survey, Buchanan had neglected an upper crust among them, which had accumulated and hoarded cash and had emerged as moneylenders forwarding Kamiauti advances to acquire dependent labour. Oral testimonies from the colonial period indicates that by the end of 19th century, Koeris in the Gaya district included rich peasants, who had acquired material wealth by improving land relation and extending market relations. This enabled them to forward advances to the dependent labourers in order to bring them under debt bondage and Kamia-Malik relationship. According to author Bindeswar Ram, who studied rural credit market of 1880s in region such as Bengal and Bihar, Koeris worked as Mahajan or moneylenders alongside Bania and Sonar caste in rural areas. Ram mentions that these social groups acted both as prosperous peasant proprietors as well as rural credit market agent by forwarding credit to tenants (Raiyat). By 1885, when the price of land surged, they started increasing their landholdings through purchase. There also witnessed increased transfer of the land of tenants by these social groups, when they mortgaged their land for credit. Ram also mentioned that after 1885, due to increase in registration of land under law and growing prices of land, the bargaining power of these groups, acting as moneylenders increased tremendously.

Malabika Chakrabarti also mentions that better-off peasants of Koeri caste in region of South Bihar supplemented their income from cultivation by working as Mahajan or moneylenders. She also notes that they also involved the local Bhuiya population in bonded labour system by forwarding Kamiauti advances (a kind of loan) to them. These Koeri Mahajans, according to Chakraborty, were most stringent in terms of their advances to Bhuiya.

In post independence India, Koeris have been classified as upper strata of Backward Castes by virtue of being part of the group of four of the OBC communities in Bihar, who acquired land overtime, adopted improved agricultural technology and attained political power to become a class of rising Kulaks in the agricultural society of India. The diversification in occupation of the Koeri caste in post independence India is shown by studies in select villages of North Bihar. In his paper, called Land and caste relation, Awanish Kumar's study of select villages of West Champaran and Samastipur district of North Bihar revealed that in some of these villages, Koeri and Yadav caste have become dominant over the time, leaving behind old elite groups, such as Bhumihars. Kumar's study found that both these caste compete for political power in these zones and a few Koeri families, who are economically sound, also own the local Primary Agricultural Credit Societies and Public Distribution System. However, intra-caste differentiation in Koeris was also high, as not all Koeri households in villages under study shared the prosperity attained by some of their clan members. The study also presented a differentiated pattern of control over land and resources, as, in some quarters, caste like Koeri and Yadav were dominant, while in others, Bhumihar caste still had control over significant amount of cultivable land.

=== Post land reforms ===
Peasants in middle castes like the Koeris benefitted the most from the land reform policies of the Indian government. Faced with the land ceiling laws and communist pressure in the 1970s, upper caste landlords resorted to selling off their lands. In most cases the buyer would be from the Koeri, the Kurmi, or the Yadav castes. These peasants worked skilfully on their land and made their holdings more productive. In contrast, the upper castes were unable to do so, and they seemed to be satisfied with the price they got for their land. The increased urbanisation among forward castes created a category of new landlords in the countryside as these three middle castes seldom sold their land, rather they looked on reforms as an opportunity to buy more.

This phenomenon promoted the upward mobility of middle peasant castes. While this mobility in the Yadavas consolidated them as both big peasants and landlords, in the Koeris, the vertical mobility was exclusively towards them becoming landlords. The rise of castes like the Koeri, the Kurmi, and the Yadav, and the fall from power of the forward castes was characterised by growing assertiveness among these middle peasants who now acted as the landowners they once condemned.

In 1989, Frankel observed that 95% of the upper castes and 36% of the middle peasant castes like the Koeri and the Yadav belonged to a rich peasant-cum-landlord class. An aversion to manual labour characterised this class. However, some Koeris and Yadavas who held comparatively less land to provide them with subsistence also worked as agricultural labourers, though the bulk of agricultural labourers belonged to the Dalit caste. According to Frankel, the bulk of middle and poor peasantry belonged to castes like the Koeris and the Yadavas; this class worked in their own fields but considered it beneath their dignity to work in others' fields. However, the socio-economic progress and transition towards the upper edge of the social hierarchy was not unabated. The Koeris, like the other middle level castes in northern India, were facing a double-edged confrontation from the upper castes who were supporters of the status quo as well as from the Dalits and the lowest castes who now became assertive for their own rights. All this made the middle castes aggressive. Sanjay Kumar associates the political mobilisation of the middle peasant castes, also called upper-OBCs with this gradual process of land reforms undertaken in Bihar in the decades preceding the period of 1970-90. According to Kumar:

Despite all their limitations, the land reform laws since 1948 have transferred ownership right in vast areas of land to upper-OBCs mainly Yadav and Koeri-Kurmi. This gave them strength to ask for a larger share in political power and by the late 1960s, they seemed to have started asserting themselves politically, which is reflected in slow but gradual rise of their representation in Vidhan Sabha (legislative assembly)

The conflict with upper caste landlords led to an attraction towards far-left naxalism. This was witnessed in Ekwari, a village, in the Bhojpur district where Jagdish Mahto, a Koeri teacher, began leading the Maoists and organised the murders of upper caste landlords after he was beaten up by Bhumihars for supporting the Communist Party of India (CPI) in the 1967 elections to Bihar Legislative Assembly. Mahto also set up a newspaper in Arrah called Harijanistan. After Mahto was killed in 1971, the communist uprising in Bhojpur subsided.

A report of the Communist Party of India (Marxist–Leninist) Liberation titled Flaming fields of Bihar revealed the participation of Koiris in the Naxalite-Maoist insurgency in some of the districts of Bihar. It was reported that being the victims of persistent banditry and oppression by the upper-caste landlords, middle castes like them more often come within the folds of revolutionary groups. The CPI(ML) remained successful in mobilising Koeris in the districts of Patna, Bhojpur, Aurangabad and Rohtas districts.

Later, a section of the upper strata of the Koeris and other middle peasant castes voiced their support for the militant organisation Ranvir Sena. This group had benefitted the most from land reforms and became ruthless towards the Dalits.

=== Affirmative Action ===
Koeris are classified as a “Backward caste” or “Other Backwards Caste” under the Indian governments system of positive discrimination, so they are entitled to OBC reservations in govt jobs. The findings of 2022 Bihar caste-based survey showed that a total of 1,12,106 members of community were holding government jobs in 2023, leading to their inclusion in the group having highest number of government jobs besides Yadavs and Kurmis in Other Backward Class category in Bihar. However, they were behind Forward Castes in holding government jobs.

== Distribution ==
Between 1872 and 1921 the Koeris represented approximately seven per cent of the population in Saran district, according to tabulated data prepared by Anand Yang. Yang also notes their involvement in tenanted landholdings around the period 1893–1901: the Koeris worked around nine per cent of the total cultivated area of the district which was one per cent less than the Ahirs, although they represented around five per cent more of the population. According to Christopher Bayly :

"Eighteenth-century settlement of Kurmi, Kacchi and Koeri cultivators were also numerous in northern and western Awadh. On the fringes of cultivation, these castes were given special rental rates for bringing areas of jungle under plough. In the first five years, for instance the rent might be only half of what was common for soil of the same type. The revenue benefits to the entrepreneur or official who planted the colony were very great."

They are also distributed in the Samastipur district of Bihar. In this district the Koeri caste is notorious for their criminal affairs and represent most of the ten Legislative Assembly seats in this district. In a fieldwork study, where data was collected in 2008-11 by Gaurang R Sahay, the details of 13 villages of Unwas panchayat in the Buxar of South western Bihar which were close to each other concluded that Koeris had the largest population and were one of the main landholding castes in ten of those villages but the average landholding by the households in the surveyed villages were found to be just 2.12 acres per household. The limited landholding was also found to be unequally distributed in caste and class. Further, another study conducted in some select villages of rural Bihar revealed the Koeris perform the function of a Purohit (family priest) and a significant number of houses were seen availing themselves of the services of the purohits of the Koeri caste.

=== Distribution outside India ===
Outside India, Koeris are distributed among the Bihari diaspora in Mauritius. Though the island is divided along ethnic and religious lines, 'Hindu' Mauritians follow a number of original customs and traditions, quite different from those seen on the Indian subcontinent. Some castes in Mauritius in particular are unrecognisable from a subcontinental Indian perspective, and may incorporate mutually antagonistic castes into a single group. The 'vaish', which includes the Koeris, is the largest and most influential caste group on the island. The former Brahmin elites together with former Kshatriya are called 'Babuji' and enjoy the prestige conferred by high caste status, though politically they are marginalised.

The Koeris also have a significant population residing in Nepal. The 1991 census conducted there included estimates of their population estimates but these were not included in the 2001 census.

=== In Uttar Pradesh ===
In some regions of Uttar Pradesh, many of the Koeris were also involved in the occupation of weaving along with members of the Mallaah caste and produce cloth for local use.

== Subdivisions, classification and culture ==
Castes similar to the Koeri in northern India include the Maurya, the Kushwaha, the Mahto, the Kachhi, the Shakya and the Saini. Over the time, these castes have come closer and began intermarrying while developing the all India network to strengthen their caste solidarity. In 1811, the physician Francis Buchanan-Hamilton classified the producer castes of Bihar and Patna - the Koeri, the Gwala, the Kurmi, the Sonar (goldsmith) and even the Kayasthas (a scribe caste) as "pure Shudra". However, due to the advancements in their level of education, the Kayastha community was first among them to challenge their Shudra status and claimed a higher Varna. They were followed by the rest of these communities.

In the households of the cultivator castes like the Koeris, there was no major segregation of family duties based on gender. Here, both male and female members of the family participated in cultivation- related operations, thus paving the way for egalitarianism and a lack of gender-related discrimination and seclusion. The view of the Koeris regarding their women is portrayed through their (Jati) Caste pamphlet, where Koeri women are described as being loyal to their husbands and having all the qualities of a true Kshatriya woman, who faces the enemy with courage and fights along with her husband rather than being defeated outrightly.

The Kshatriya reform movement in the middle peasant castes which took place during 1890s turned rural Bihar into an arena of conflict. William Pinch claims that castes like the Koeris, the Kurmi, and the Yadav joined the British Indian Army as soldiers. The kshatriyatva or "essence of being kshatriya", was characterised by aggressiveness among these castes, which led to the formation of many caste armies resulting in intercaste conflict.

In the 1980s, in region surrounding Kaimur Plateau of Rohtas district, Koeris also operated bandit groups, which were responsible for caste warfare with the members of rival groups. One such group was Ramashish Koeri gang, which operated out of Kaimur hills.

== Organisation ==
In the interwar years, during a period when there was a general movement among various castes seeking to uplift their status, there was also at least one journal being published for the Koeri community, the Kashbala Kshatriya Mitra, while other interests of the Koeri community is taken care of by the Kushwaha Kshatriya Mahasabha. Besides these organisations, there exists various state level organisations catering to socio-political needs of the community. In Jharkhand, one such organisation called Kushwaha Mahasabha works for political empowerment of community. Prominent Jharkhand leaders like Aklu Ram Mahto, Dev Dyal Kushwaha and Bhubneshwar Prasad Mehta had remained associated with this organisation in past.

== Politics ==
In the early twentieth century, the Koeri and their sub-caste the Murao participated in the politics of the Kisan Sabha, which worked for the peasants' cause against the ill effects of landlordism and the 1920 Gandhian non-cooperation movement. These peasant castes, which had a long tradition of independence and caste solidarity, founded the Kisan Sabhas, which later became instrumental in supporting peasant causes. The traditional method of Nai-Dhobi band—disallowing of service of washermen and barbers to enforce the sanctions on the landlords and use of their robust caste panchayats—became a symbol of this peasant movement. Koeri leader Mata Badal Koeri became a founding leader of Oudh Kisan Sabha (Awadh Farmers Conference) along with Baba Ram Chandra. Large numbers of Koeris participated in the Awadh Kisan Conference of 1920, which was held in Ayodhya.

In the heyday of British Raj, the Koeris aligned with the Kurmis and the Yadavs to form a caste coalition-cum-political party called Triveni Sangh. The actual date of the formation of Triveni Sangh is disputed among scholars. This caste coalition fared badly against the Congress party and faced a considerable challenge from Congress's backward class federation. Though politically it was not able to make a significant mark, it remained successful in eradicating the practice of begar (forced labour).

The Indian National Congress continued its policy of not giving due importance to the demand of upper-OBCs for more political representation and the Koeris along with other OBCs remained unsatisfied in the post independence period as well, when the question of political representation for greater part of society was gaining ground. The Congress's reliance on its "Coalition Of Extremes", referring to the alliance of Upper Castes, Dalits and Muslims became the prime reason behind the upper-OBC's drive for alternative route to gain political ascendency. The "Coalition Of Extremes" was also favourable for the upper-caste lobby within the Congress, as they knew that Dalits being a weak socio-economic group could hardly pose any challenge to their position in the socio-economic sphere unlike the Upper-Backwards.

The period of the 1960s witnessed an improvement in the fortunes of the backward castes in politics, with a significant growth seen in the number of backward caste MLAs in the Bihar legislative assembly. In the 1970s, with the defining slogan of social justice, Koeris rose to prominence in the politics of Bihar under the leadership of Jagdeo Prasad. However, this achievement was short-lived and their representation was gradually lost to other backward castes after Prasad's death. This period also witnessed Satish Prasad Singh, a lesser known Koeri leader, become the chief minister of Bihar merely a week after the fall of Mahamaya Prasad Sinha government. He led a coalition of the Shoshit Samaj Dal party of Jagdeo Prasad and the Congress.

In 1977, the Karpoori Thakur government of Bihar introduced an affirmative action of quota in government jobs and universities. While the lower backward castes were assigned 12% of the quota, only eight per cent was earmarked for landowning castes like the Koeri, the Kurmi and the Yadavs. Being a Nai by caste, Thakur was aware of the robust economic position and aggressiveness of these castes who were many times seen bullying the Harijans and lower backwards castes.

In later years, the Koeris remained in a muted position for a long period in politics or played a secondary role, while the Yadav-centric politics of Laloo Yadav flourished in Bihar. However, after the formation of the Samta Party (now Janata Dal (United)) by Nitish Kumar, they voted en masse for Samta. Its alliance showed that political parties in Bihar are identified with caste and the Samta Party was considered the party of Koeri-Kurmi community. Until the 2015 Bihar Legislative Assembly elections, Koeris were well represented in Janata Dal (United). Out of twenty Koeri legislators elected to 243 membered Bihar Legislative Assembly, eleven were from JDU.

The parting of the ways between the Koeris and the Kurmis and the movement of the Koeris away from Janata Dal (United) (JD(U)) was witnessed after the formation of the Rashtriya Lok Samta Party by Upendra Kushwaha, who commanded huge support among members of the Koeri castes. The Bharatiya Janata Party appealed to the kushwaha in the 2014 elections in hopes of getting the support of the Koeri caste who had earlier voted for Nitish Kumar and the JD(U). However, the quitting of BJP and alliance by Upendra Kushwaha left Koeri politics in Bihar in a dilemma. This rift between the Koeris and the Kurmis was orchestrated by the rise of influential Koeri leaders like Mahendra Singh and Shakuni Choudhury, while Kushwaha remained the strongest leader of the community in Bihar.

In 2010s, attempts to trace the community's lineage to Mauryan king Ashoka were supported by Bharatiya Janata Party and Janata Dal (United) with an apparent eye towards the electoral benefits, particularly in northern Indian states like Bihar and Uttar Pradesh.

== Notables ==
- Sumitra Devi, first women cabinet minister of Bihar, several times Member of Bihar Legislative Assembly, mother-in-law of former Lok Sabha speaker Meira Kumar.
- Jagdish Mahto, the founder of Naxalism in the state of Bihar. He was the leader of 1970 Bhojpur uprising.
- Jagdeo Prasad, a socialist leader and former Deputy Chief Minister in the Government of Bihar.
- Upendra Nath Verma, participated in Indian Independence movement. He served as a Union Minister in the cabinet of Vishwanath Pratap Singh.
- Chandradeo Prasad Verma, participated in Indian Independence movement. He also served as Union Minister in Government of India.
- Ramdeo Verma, six term Member of Bihar Legislative Assembly from Bibhutipur Assembly constituency, leader of Communist Party of India (Marxist).
- Satish Prasad Singh, former Chief Minister of Bihar.
- Tulsidas Mehta, six times Member of Bihar Legislative Assembly from Jandaha Assembly constituency, founder of The Vaishali Cooperative Bank.
- Manju Verma, former minister for social welfare, Government of Bihar.
- Samrat Choudhary, Bihar state president of Bhartiya Janata Party, former minister in Government of Bihar.
- Mewalal Chaudhary, former Vice-Chancellor of Bihar Agricultural University, former Minister of Education (Government of Bihar).
- Ajit Kumar Mehta, educationist, former professor of technology at Birla Institute of Technology, Mesra and former Member of Parliament from Samastipur Lok Sabha constituency.
- Saurabh Suman, Agri researcher, received Nari Shakti Award for social service.
- Baidyanath Prasad Mahto, former deputy leader of Janata Dal (United) in Lok Sabha, twice Member of Parliament from Valmiki Nagar Lok Sabha constituency.
- Chandrashekhar Prasad, former president of Jawaharlal Nehru University Students' Union, one of the founding leader of All India Students Association, known for his opposition to Mohammad Shahabuddin.
- Rati Lal Prasad Verma, founding leader of Bharatiya Jana Sangh and Bharatiya Janata Party in Bihar-Jharkhand region; former member of Lok Sabha from Kodarma Lok Sabha constituency, Jharkhand.
- Binod Singh Kushwaha, former Minister for Backward and Extremely Backward Castes in Government of Bihar, former MLA of BJP from Pranpur Assembly constituency.
- Ramdeo Mahto, founding leader of Bharatiya Janata Party and Bhartiya Jana Sangh in Bihar, former Member of Bihar Legislative Assembly from Patna East Assembly constituency.

== See also ==
- Bihari Mauritians
- History of Backward Caste movement in Bihar
- Maurya (surname)
- Kushwaha (surname)
- Shakya (surname)
