= Saini (surname) =

Indian surname

Saini is an Indian surname, used by various communities in North India. In Uttar Pradesh, it is used by people of Kushwaha or the Koeri caste. (Note: Maurya belongs to the biggest caste group among OBCs after Yadavs and Kurmis. Known by the surnames Kachhi, Maurya, Kushwaha, Saini and Shakya, this group is present in most assembly seats from east to west UP. Maurya had been strategically groomed by the BSP to attract these votes. Since the expulsion in 2011 of former minister Babu Singh Kushwaha, who belongs to the same caste group.) In Rajasthan and Haryana, it is most often associated with Mali caste. Saini is also a community of Punjab, included in state's list of Other Backward Class from 2016 onwards. In Haryana term Saini is considered synonymous with other terms such as Koeri, Kushwaha, Maurya and Shakya, all included in state's list of Backward Castes.

== Notable people ==
The notable people with Saini surname, who may or may not belong to aforementioned caste/community, with whom this surname is often associated are:

=== Politicians ===
- Bishan Lal Saini, member of Haryana Legislative Assembly from Radaur Assembly constituency.
- Dharam Singh Saini, multiple times Member of Uttar Pradesh Legislative Assembly from Nakur Assembly constituency, former minister in Government of Uttar Pradesh.
- Kamlesh Saini, Uttar Pradesh politician.
- Naresh Saini, Uttar Pradesh politician.
- Madan Lal Saini, former Member of Rajasthan Legislative Assembly, Member of Indian Parliament (Rajya Sabha)
- Pawan Saini, member of Haryana Legislative Assembly from Ladwa Assembly constituency.
- Prabhu Lal Saini, former Member of Rajasthan Legislative Assembly from Anta Assembly constituency, cabinet minister in Vasundhara Raje's government.
- Rajkumar Saini, former Member of Indian Parliament from Kurukshetra Lok Sabha constituency, Haryana.
- Rajpal Singh Saini, former Member of Indian Parliament (Rajya Sabha), from Uttar Pradesh.
- Satyapal Singh Saini, former Member of Indian Parliament from Sambhal Lok Sabha constituency.
- Vikram Singh Saini, former Member of Uttar Pradesh Legislative Assembly from Khatauli Assembly constituency.
- Manzil Saini, Indian Police Services officer, served as DIG of National Security Guards.
- Nayab Singh Saini, minister in Government of Haryana.
- Satpal Saini, former MLA from Punjab Legislative Assembly
- Raj Saini, Canadian Politician
- Gurbux Saini, Member of Parliament (Canada) in Canada
- Kalpana Saini, MP (Rajya Sabha)
- Jaswant Singh Saini, Minister of State in Government of Uttar Pradesh
- Bhagchand Saini Tankda, MLA from Bandikui Assembly constituency
- Bhagawana Ram Saini, MLA from Udaipurwati
- Madan Lal Saini, former State President of BJP (Rajasthan)
- Kailasho Devi Saini, former Member of Parliament, Lok Sabha from Kurukshetra district
- Angad Singh Saini, former MLA from Punjab Legislative Assembly

=== Film and television ===
- Flora Saini, Indian actress and model
- Shree Saini, American model and beauty pageant holder
- Shiwani Saini, Indian actress

=== Sports ===
- Navdeep Saini - Indian Cricketer from Haryana
- Gopal Saini - Indian Middle distance runner, who bagged prestigious Arjuna award, from Rajasthan
- Nitin Saini - Former Indian Cricketer from Haryana
- Kajal Saini - Indian Sport Shooter from Haryana
- Harshit Saini - Indian Cricketer from Haryana
- Shanu Saini - Indian Cricketer from Uttar Pradesh
- Nirmal Saini, former captain of Indian national Volleyball team.
- Baljit Singh Saini, Indian hockey player
- Ashbeer Saini, Indian golf player

=== Science ===
- Angela Saini - British science journalist

== See also ==
- Mahto
- Kushwaha (surname)
