= Mahan Dal =

- Leader: Keshav Dev Maurya
- Founder: Keshav Dev Maurya
- Headquarters: Sector-30, Faridabad, Haryana
- Alliance: SP+ (2020-2022); Indian National Developmental Inclusive Alliance (2023-)
- Seats in Uttar Pradesh Legislative Assembly: 0 / 403

Website
- www.mahandal.com

Mahan Dal (translation: Great Party) is an Indian political party founded by Keshav Dev Maurya based in Uttar Pradesh, India.

== Politics ==
Mahan Dal was launched in 2008 by Keshav Dev Maurya and it is perceived to have an impact in Rohilkhand and Western UP regions. Mahan Dal claims to have the support of a range of Other Backward Classes such as Mauryas, Shakyas, Kushwahas, Sainis and Kambojs. However, it has failed to make electoral inroads so far.

IN 2022 assembly elections for Uttar Pradesh, Mahan Dal is in alliance with Samajwadi Party. SP president Akhilesh Yadav was the chief guest at the Mahan Dal's workers' convention held at the Samajwadi Party office in August 2021. Party State President for U.P., Mr Shiv Kumar Yadav has announced that Mahan Dal will fight on 8 seats in the upcoming assembly elections in the alliance of Samajwadi Party and all candidates of Mahan Dal will fight on symbol of Samajwadi Party.

The Congress had contested the 2012 assembly election as well as 2014 Lok Sabha polls in alliance with the Mahan Dal. Ahead of the 2017 assembly elections, the SP and the Congress had held talks with Maurya for an alliance. He was even called to the All India Congress Committee (AICC) office in New Delhi to hold talks with Rahul Gandhi. The alliance, however, could not materialise after the Congress strategist told Maurya to merge his party into the Congress. Maurya turned down the proposal stating that he was ready to discuss seat-sharing but not merger.

== Elections ==
=== 2014 Loksabha election ===
Mahan Dal had joined the Indian National Congress-led United Progressive Alliance. In western Uttar Pradesh, Mahan Dal contested on three Lok Sabha constituencies, Badaun, Nagina and Etah while Rashtriya Lok Dal contested in eight constituencies as per an arrangement with INC.

Mahan Dal claimed that the OBC voters of western UP specially Shakyas, Mauryas and Kushwahas would support them in the election but Mahan Dal candidates lost on all three allocated seats.

=== 2019 general election ===
The Congress leader said the party will follow the type of politics in which everyone is represented equally. Congress will fight with ‘full might’ as party allies with Mahan Dal said by Priyanka Gandhi.
