= Murao people =

Hindu caste

Muraos are a community of agriculturists found in parts of Uttar Pradesh and Bihar in India. They are also known as Maurya. They form a part of a wider community called the Kushwaha, which includes Koeri and Kachhi castes. The All India Kushwaha Kshatriya Mahasabha is an organisation of these sub-castes, which also represents the interests of the Murao community.

In Uttar Pradesh, a section of the community called Kunjra amongst Muslims, classified as an Other Backward Class, was formed due to conversion of Muraos to Islam. The Kunjra are also called Sabj Farosh and like Muraos, they grew vegetables. In recent times, the community produced educated individuals engaged in white collar jobs. The Kunjras are an urban-based and landed community in Uttar Pradesh, a group among them, now called Kabaria has distinguished itself from the community by adopting the profession of dealing in scrap. However, vast majority of them are now involved in trade, business and are employed in service sector.

== History ==
During 1919-1920, in the villages like Rure, Arkha and Rasulpur of Uttar Pradesh, large population of superior cultivating castes like Muraos and Kurmis resided. These castes had age old tradition of independence and caste solidarity and it was among them that the Kisan Sabha movement of early twentieth century took its initial roots. These cultivating castes followed the traditional method of Nai-Dhobi band (or disallowing the service of barber and washerman to non cooperators in their struggle against the landlords) and used their robust caste panchayats to give initial support to Kisan Sabha politics, which worked for solving peasant grievances against the landlords and also blended with Non-cooperation movement under Mahatma Gandhi.

== See also ==
- Sainthwar
