= Bhagwan Singh Shakya =

Indian politician from Uttar Pradesh

Member of Uttar Pradesh Legislative Assembly
- In office 1977–1980
- Constituency: Usehat Assembly constituency

Member of Uttar Pradesh Legislative Assembly
- In office 1989–1991
- Constituency: Usehat Assembly constituency

Member of Uttar Pradesh Legislative Assembly
- In office 1997–2002
- Constituency: Usehat Assembly constituency

Former Minister of State for Agriculture in Government of Uttar Pradesh

Personal details
- Born: 20 January 1950 (age 76)
- Party: Bahujan Samaj Party
- Other political affiliations: Bharatiya Janata Party
- Spouse: Shanti Devi
- Children: Dharmendra Kumar Singh Shakya
- Parent: Chandan Singh

Bhagwan Singh Shakya (born 20 January 1950) is an Indian politician, who was elected to the Uttar Pradesh Legislative Assembly through 1996 Uttar Pradesh Legislative Assembly election. He became a member of 13th Uttar Pradesh Assembly as a member of Bahujan Samaj Party. Shakya represented Usehat Assembly constituency of Budaun district of Uttar Pradesh. He was also a Minister of State in Government of Uttar Pradesh. Shakya served as member of Uttar Pradesh Legislative Assembly for three terms.

== Life and career ==
Bhagwan Singh Shakya was born on 20 January 1950 to Chandan Singh in Jakheli village of Budayun district of Uttar Pradesh. His was educated at Aligarh. Shakya completed his bachelor's degree in science from there. He was married to Shanti Devi on 4 May 1971. They had two sons and one daughter. One of his son Dharmendra Kumar Singh Shakya also served as member of Uttar Pradesh Legislative Assembly from Shekhupur Assembly constituency. Prior to joining active politics, he was an agriculturist by profession.

He was first elected to Uttar Pradesh Legislative Assembly in 1977, when he contested on the ticket of Janata Party. In 1989, he was elected for the second term, this time, on the ticket of Janata Dal. In 1996 mid term elections, he was elected to Uttar Pradesh Legislative Assembly for the third time. He was a member of Bahujan Samaj Party then. Shakya was also one of the victim of National Emergency of 1975. He was imprisoned for eleven months during the emergency, under the Maintenance of Internal Security Act. From 1989 to 1991, he served as member of various committees of Uttar Pradesh Legislative Assembly. He got 70,010 votes in 1996 elections and defeated Banwari Singh Yadav of Samajwadi Party. He served as Minister of State for Agriculture in Kalyan Singh ministry from 27 October 1997.
