= Shakya (surname) =

Shakya is an Indian surname and is part of the broader Kushwaha community surnames like Maurya, Kachhi, Saini, Koeri etc, who collectively assert descent from Kusha, a son of the avatar of Vishnu, Rama.

== Shakya surname in Nepal ==
In Nepal, Shakyas function as Vajrayana priests and are ranked higher in the caste hierarchy among Newari community since they are believed to be the descendants of Gautam Buddha himself.

== Notable people ==
Notable people with this surname, who may or may not be associated with the caste/clan, are:

- Alok Kumar Shakya, former member of Uttar Pradesh Legislative Assembly from Bhongaon Assembly constituency.
- Bhagwan Singh Shakya, former minister of State in Government of Uttar Pradesh.
- Daya Ram Shakya, former Member of Indian Parliament from Farrukhabad Lok Sabha constituency.
- Devesh Shakya, member of Indian parliament, Lok Sabha from Etah Lok Sabha constituency
- Geeta Shakya, Member of Indian Parliament (Rajya Sabha) from Uttar Pradesh.
- Gore Lal Shakya, former Member of Uttar Pradesh Legislative Assembly from Bharthana Assembly constituency.
- Mahadeepak Singh Shakya, five times Member of Indian Parliament from Etah Lok Sabha constituency.
- Sushil Kumar Shakya, Member of Uttar Pradesh Legislative Assembly from Amritpur Assembly constituency.
- Dharmendra Kumar Singh Shakya, Member of Uttar Pradesh Legislative Assembly from Shekhupur Assembly constituency.
- Panna Kaji Shakya, Nepali singer, songwriter, and composer.
- Panna Lal Shakya, former member of Madhya Pradesh Legislative Assembly from Guna Assembly constituency.
- Sinod Kumar Shakya, former Member of Uttar Pradesh Legislative Assembly from Dataganj Assembly constituency.
- Vinay Shakya, former Member of Uttar Pradesh Legislative Assembly from Bidhuna Assembly constituency.
- Raghuraj Singh Shakya, former Member of Uttar Pradesh Legislative Assembly from Etawah Assembly constituency.
- Ram Singh Shakya, former member of Lok Sabha from Etawah Lok Sabha constituency.
- Ram Autar Shakya, former member of Uttar Pradesh Legislative Assembly from Bhongaon Assembly constituency.
- Suraj Singh Shakya, four times member of Uttar Pradesh Legislative Assembly from Sakit Assembly constituency in Etah district.
- Harish Shakya, Member of Uttar Pradesh Legislative Assembly from Bilsi Assembly constituency.
- Mamtesh Shakya, former Member of Uttar Pradesh Legislative Assembly from Patiyali Assembly constituency.
- Bidya Sundar Shakya, mayor of Kathmandu city from 2017 to 2022
- Payal Shakya, Miss Nepal World 2004
- Sushma Shakya, Nepali artist
- Dhiren Shakya, Nepali movie star
