= Badri Narain Sinha =

Indian policeman and writer (1930–1979)

- Born: 4 April 1930; Saramohanpur, Darbhanga district, Bihar State, India
- Died: 7 November 1979 (aged 49); Patna
- Other names: Badri Babu; BN Sinha IPS
- Occupation: Indian Police Service officer of 1952 batch in Bihar cadre

Badri Narain Sinha (4 April 1930 – 7 November 1979) was born at village Saramohanpur in Darbhanga district of Bihar. An officer of Indian Police Service of 1952 batch of Bihar cadre of India, Sinha died in harness as Deputy Inspector General (CID), Government of Bihar. Sinha, described as ‘erudite and knowledgeable police chief’ by noted sociologist-journalist Arvind N Das, was a littérateur poet, critic, journalist, and a close associate of Jayprakash Narayan. He also served as an administrator. Additionally, Sinha was a secular devout who broke bread with Muslims during the holy month of Ramzan. He practised austere Hindu fast during the whole month of Kartik, personifying in his life the multi-faceted moral actions that he highlights as Gandhi's character and, therefore, his message in his writings on the Mahatma.

== Professional life ==
Sinha was born in a Ambastha Kayastha family. He, an MA in English Literature from Patna University (1949), first became an English Lecturer at C. M. College, Darbhanga, then at Ranchi College, Ranchi, before joining Indian Police Service in 1952. Sinha served as Superintendent of Police, Champaran (1958–63) and Bhagalpur (1965–68), Superintendent of Railway Police, Muzaffarpur (1968–70) and Senior Superintendent of Police, Ranchi (1970–71), Deputy Inspector-General of Police and Member Secretary, Bihar Police Manual Revision Committee in June, 1971, Deputy Inspector-General (DIG) of Police, Central Range, Patna (1974–77) and later DIG of Police, Criminal Investigation Department till his death in harness on 7 November 1979. Sinha was awarded the Indian Police Medal in 1971 for his meritorious and distinguished services and was decorated with the President's Police Medal in August, 1979. Sinha was Founder-Editor of Bihar Police Patrika, the official organ of the Bihar Police, a mantle which he carried till his premature end.

== Literary contribution ==
Sinha was an acclaimed literary critic and reputed writer in the field of Hindi Literature. He authored Prathmiki, a landmark work in Hindi literary criticism in 1965 and followed it up with Aaj Tak Ki, its companion volume. Published Tatka Adam, a book of modern Hindi Poetry; wrote twin books with the life of Mahatma Gandhi as subject- Ab Bahu Se Sab Jan Hitay in Hindi and MAN THOU CAN in English; authored Students' Revolt, a concise book on student unrest – a must-read for police officers dealing with students’ disturbances for its insight. His book, Apradhiki, a rare pioneering work in Hindi on Criminology, was awarded the Best Book of The Year 1971 by the Government of Uttar Pradesh.

== From Naxalbari to Ekbari ==
As DIG (Naxalites), Sinha showed rare intellectual integrity and courage by writing three articles in the English daily The Searchlight recognising the naxalite movement as a socio-economic and political issue and not just as a mere policing job. In these pioneering articles, Sinha stated, "putting in zealous and dedicated social reformers drawn from all shades to bring about transformation on the socio-cultural planes’ is as much a part of ‘the counter-insurgency measures’ as ‘concentrated police operations or operations by the special task forces, may be from the supreme armed formation, the army itself." This has been seen as major critical interpretation of the movements like Bhoodan in India started by Vinoba Bhave.

== Public contribution ==
Founder of Shankar Shah Vikramashila (SSV) Mahavidyalaya at Kahalgaon in Bhagalpur district while working as SP there by pooling public contribution including a big building on a hillock from a philanthropist after whom he prefixed the name of the college based on the famous ancient Vikramashila University. Vikramashila was one of the two most important centers of Buddhist learning in India during the Pala empire, along with Nalanda, established by King Dharmapala (783 to 820) in response to a supposed decline in the quality of scholarship at Nalanda. Thus he pioneered many decades ago what is now advocated as Public-private partnership (PPP) model of development, tangibly fostering the concept of community policing in India and building bridges to contain students' unrest.
