= Shakya (disambiguation) =

Shakya was an ancient Indo-Aryan tribe to which the Buddha belonged.

Shakya may also refer to:

- Shakya Chogden (1428–1507), Tibetan Buddhist scholar
- Newar caste system, a community in Nepal and North India
- Shakya (surname), a surname used by some agricultural castes in Uttar Pradesh, India

== See also ==
- Sakyas (disambiguation)
- Sakya, a school of Tibetan Buddhism
