= Turha =

Hindu caste

Regions with significant populations
- • India
- Bihar: 467867 (0.3579 % of Bihar's population)

Religion
- • Hinduism

The Turha are Hindu caste, found in the state of Bihar in India. They are also known as the Tomar.

== History and origin ==
The Turha claim to have belonged to the Tomar Rajput community, who arrived from Rajasthan some five hundred years ago. After suffering a defeat, the Tomar took growing and selling vegetables, to disguise their Rajput identity. Over time Tomar was corrupted to Turha. They are found mainly in Darbhanga and Muzaffarpur districts, with a few also found in the neighbouring Terai region of Nepal. They speak Maithili and Hindi.

== Present circumstances ==
The Turha are divided into a number of lineages known as khandans. Marriages are forbidden within the khandan. The largest khandan is the Palak Turha. There main occupation remains the growing and selling of vegetables, and have much in common with the Mali, another community of a similar status.
