= Ajit Kumar Mehta =

Indian politician (born 1932)

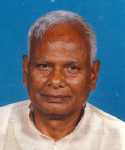

Former Member of Parliament
- Constituency: Samastipur

Personal details
- Born: 3 February 1932
- Party: Indian National Congress; Samyukta Socialist Party; Janata Party; Rashtriya Janata Dal
- Spouse: Susheela Rani Mehta
- Education: Science College, Patna, Bihar College of Engineering, Birla Institute of Technology Mesra
- Profession: Professor at Birla Institute of Technology, Mesra, Engineer, politician and social worker.

Ajit Kumar Mehta (born 3 February 1932) was an Indian politician who was a member of 6th Lok Sabha from Samastipur (Lok Sabha constituency) in Bihar State. He was elected to 7th, 11th and 12th Lok Sabha from Samastipur. Before joining active politics, Mehta was an educationist, working as professor at Birla Institute of Technology Mesra. In his early age, he also worked as an Indian independence activist. Mehta was a member of socialist camp during Indian freedom struggle and had remained an active part of Azad Dasta (a rebel group constituted by Jayprakash Narayan) during Quit India movement.

== Life and career ==
=== Background ===
Mehta was born on 3 February 1932 to Ram Khelawan Mehta in Fatehpur Bala village of Samastipur district of Bihar in a Koeri family. An alumnus of Science College, Patna, Bihar College of Engineering, Patna and Birla Institute of Technology, Mesra, he worked as a professor and technologist after completing his education. Besides being an engineer, he also worked as a political and social worker. Mehta was inspired by his father Ram Khelawan Mehta, who was freedom fighter and his teacher Palakdhari Singh. He participated in Indian Freedom Struggle in his early childhood, as a result of which arrest warrants were issued against him. He was supported by his elder brother Chandra Bhanu Mehta; both of them were involved in revolutionary activities during the Quit India movement, 1942. During the same time, he came in contact with Karpoori Thakur and assisted the 'Azad Dasta', a rebel group made by socialist leaders during the 1942 Quit India movement. He along with his elder brother helped Vashishta Narayan Singh, a revolutionary, in seeking shelter after his escape from Darbhanga Jail. Until 1949, Mehta remained an active member of Indian National Congress, but later switched to Socialist Party. He also remained member of Praja Socialist Party and Samyukta Socialist Party after leaving Congress in 1949. Later he became a member of Janata Party during 1977-79 and 1982. As an Engineer and Technologist he also worked as technical assistant for Gandak Project. Mehta was also engaged in pedagogy as Assistant Professor in B.I.T. Ranchi. He finally retired as Professor from the B.I.T. in 1992.

=== Political career ===
Mehta was elected to 6th Lok Sabha in 1978 and during 1979-82, he served as a member of Parliamentary Committee on Papers Laid on the Table. In 1980, he was re-elected to 7th Lok Sabha for his second term. His political achievements raised him to important position of whip of Janata Party in Lok Sabha. He subsequently became member of various other parliamentary committees like, Committee on Public Undertakings (1982–83), Committee on Estimates (1983–84), Committee on Public Accounts (1996–97), Committee on Human Resource Development (1998–99) and Committee on Petitions. In 1996, he was re-elected to 11th Lok Sabha for his third term. In 1998 Lok Sabha elections, he was again elected to 12th Lok Sabha becoming the Member of Parliament for four terms.

=== Social and cultural activities ===
Besides politics, Mehta also participated in many socio-cultural activities. He served as member of planning forum of Birla Institute of Technology and was involved in many projects pertaining to rural development, industrialization in rural areas and upliftment of the downtrodden. Mehta also served as president of Akhil Bharatiya Kushwaha Mahasabha from 1980-86.

== See also ==
- Chandradeo Prasad Verma
- Ramdeo Verma
- Saurabh Suman
