= Yadunandan Prasad Mehta =

Indian monk and social reformer

- Born: February 18, 1911; Jitaura village, Shahabad district, Bihar, India
- Died: January 3, 1986 (aged 74)
- Occupation(s): Indian monk, social reformer, writer
- Known for: Founding the Triveni Sangh organization

Yadunandan Prasad Mehta also called Swami Sahastranan Saraswati (February 18, 1911-January 3, 1986) was an Indian monk, social reformer and chief theoretician of Triveni Sangh movement, based in Shahabad district of Bihar. Mehta worked for plight of migrant labourers in Pegu and founded the first organisation for the Backward Castes of Bihar, which worked for ending begar (unpaid free work) and voiced support for the political rights of the Backwards. He was also the compiler of literature of Sangh— which served as its mouthpiece and manifesto. Some of the notable works of Mehta included; Aage badhne ke rahein, Gaon Ka Sona and Aage badho. He was also the editor of Triveni Sangh's magazine called Shoshit Pukar.

== Lead up to priesthood ==
Author Prem Kumar Mani recounts an incident, which happened in his ancestral village of Bihar. This incident, refers to a large scale yajña organised in his ancestral village, the chief officiating priest of which was Yadunandan Prasad Mehta. In his village, there resided a widowed women, who lost her husband at a young age, and became ascetic, involving herself in service of god. She converted her house into a temple, and endeared herself to villagers, who called her Maji (mother). Once, she decided to conduct a large Yajna and in order to organise it, she needed Dakṣiṇā. Thus, she started wandering from village to village, collecting Dāna and Dakshina. In course of her journey, while passing through a village dominated by Forward Castes, some youths belonging to influential upper caste families misbehaved with her. According to Mani, they couldn't tolerate a woman from lower caste, dressed up as Sādhvī, collecting fund for officiating a sacrifice. These youths pulled her Saree, and Maji became completely naked in front of village. However, she continued her journey and wandered naked around the village. When the women of her native village came to be aware of the incident, they came hurriedly and covered her body, they took her to her home and a gathering of village elders took place at her home. Mani's father was a local leader of Indian National Congress, an atheist, he never had interest in yajna and sacrifices, however, after this incident, he took up the responsibility of organising this yajna upon himself. This incident was seen by the villagers as a challenge upon themselves by the upper castes—who enjoyed the control upon priesthood for centuries.

When the search for a priest, who could officiate this yajna began, Yadunandan Prasad Mehta— who used to dress up like a Sadhu, was invited to the village. According to Mani, he resided at his place for more than a month and this yajna was given a shape of large fair by the Backward Castes of the village. Everyday, after performing the Puja, Mehta used to travel in the village, distributing a small booklet to the people. Surprisingly, he also took out eggs from his bag and used to give it to the malnourished women and children. While distributing eggs, he used to emphasize upon the need of proper nutrition, needed by children of 'Backward Castes' and Dalits. Mehta used to say that children of peasants and labourers were mentally weak as they lack proper nutrition, hence, they should take supplementary nutrition for their mental development. For many, the promotion of consumption of eggs by a Sadhu, came out as a surprise.

== Bibliography ==
- Jal, Murzban (2023). Rethinking Caste and Resistance in India. Taylor and Francis. pp. 130–140. ISBN 9781000905946.
- Singh, S. (2020). JP to BJP: Bihar After Lalu and Nitish. India: SAGE Publications.
- Mishra, S. (2000). Grassroot Politics in India. India: Mittal Publications.
