= Mali caste =

Occupational caste among Hindus

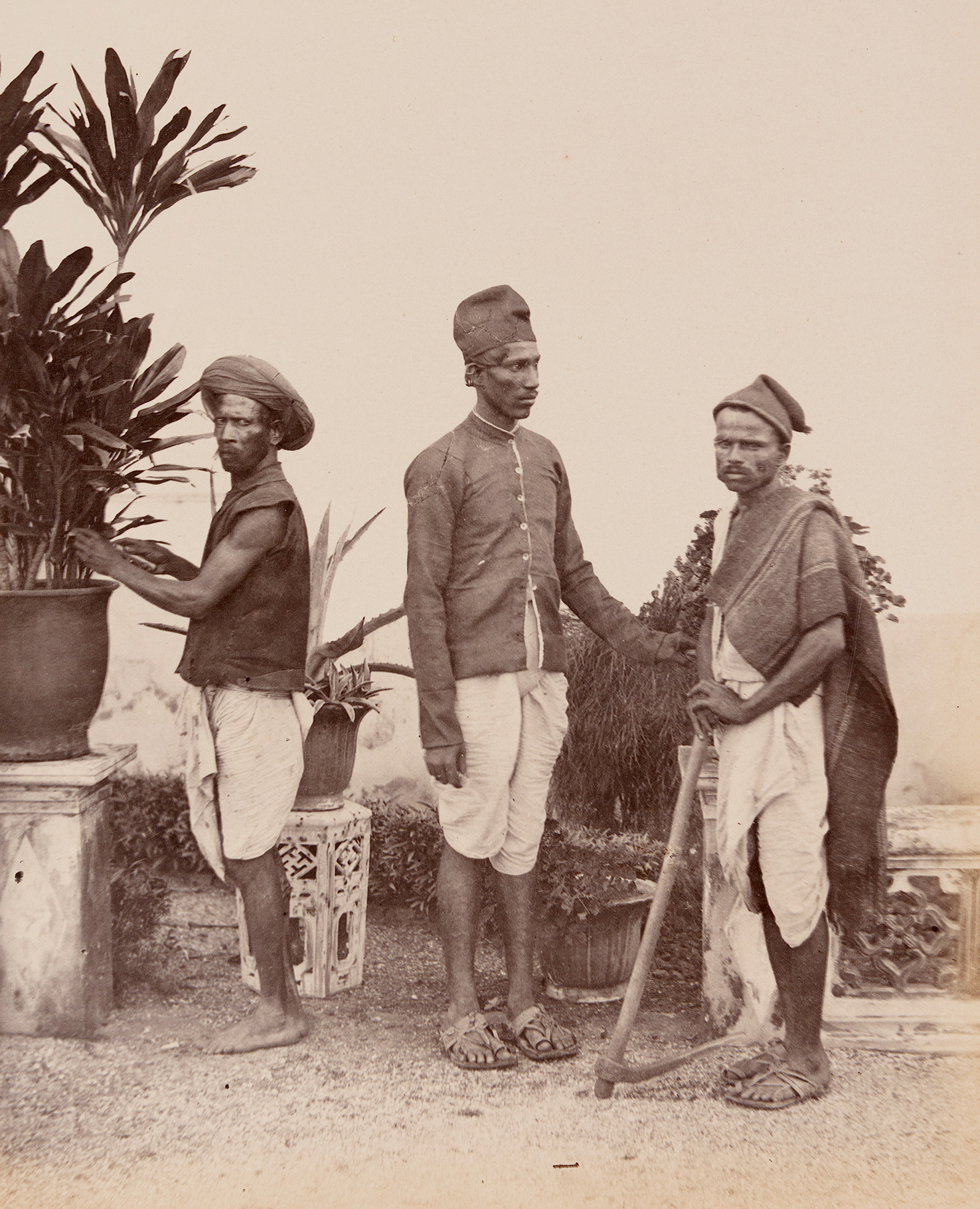
Malis in western India (c. 1855-1862).

The Mali are an occupational caste found among the Hindus who traditionally worked as gardeners and florists. They also call themselves Phul Mali due to their occupation of growing flowers. The Mali are found throughout North India, East India as well as the Terai region of Nepal and Maharashtra. Iravati Karve, an anthropologist, showed how the Maratha caste was generated from Kunbis who simply started calling themselves "Maratha". She states that Maratha, Kunbi and Mali are the three main farming communities of Maharashtra – the difference being that the Marathas and Kunbis were "dry farmers" whereas the Mali farmed throughout the year.

== Mali of Northern india ==
In Rajasthan, caste based outfits of Mali caste, like 'Mahatama Phule Brigade', which caters to various needs of community associates them with Kushwaha caste. It is consented that Maurya, Kushwaha, Shakya, Saini are the different terms used to describe same community in various parts of North India.

Malis of Rajasthan launched a protest by blocking Jaipur-Agra Highway in 2023; they demanded that a survey should be conducted by state in order to find out socio-economic status of the community in various regions of Rajasthan. They also demanded 12 percent reservation in government jobs and educational institutions in state for themselves and their sister communities, the Shakya, Kushwaha, Maurya and Saini. In this protest, they were joined by members of aforementioned communities.

== Caste identity ==
In the Northernmost plain-land of Punjab most of the Mali’s (or Gardner) belong to disaffiliated communities of Saini origin, while most of them were indefinably look below the member of Kshatriya (Rajput) or Jat community.

The Mali community of Rajasthan and Haryana state adopted the surname Saini during the 1930s when India was under British colonial rule.

== Mali caste of Maharashtra ==
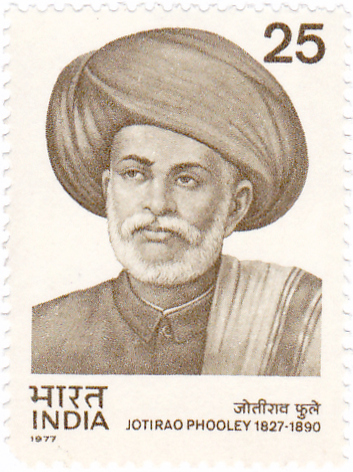
Jyotirao Phule,19th century social reformer

The Mali of Maharashtra are a caste of cultivators specializing in horticulture. The caste is concentrated in five districts of Western Maharashtra and a district in the Vidarbha region. They traditionally made their living by cultivating fruit, flowers and vegetables. There are many different sub-castes depending on what the sub-group cultivated, for example, the Phul mali were florists, the Jire mali grew jire or cumin, and halde mali cultivated Halad (turmeric) etc. In the 20th century, the mali have been the pioneers in using irrigation to grow cash crops such as sugar cane and in establishing farmer owned sugar mills. This led later in the century of wide spread cultivation of sugarcane in Western Maharashtra by other communities as well as the establishment hundreds of sugar mills in Maharashtra and other regions of India.

=== Social activism & politics ===
The 19th century social reformer, Jyotirao Phule belonged to the Mali community. His work extended to many fields including eradication of untouchability and the caste system, and women's emancipation. He and his wife, Savitribai Phule, were pioneers of education for women and Dalits in India. The couple was among the first native Indians to open a school for girls of India. He also founded a home for pregnant Hindu brahmin widows who were cast out by their families. In 1873, Phule, along with his followers, formed the Satyashodhak Samaj (Society of Seekers of Truth) to attain equal rights for people from lower castes. Other Mali such as Gyanoba Sasane and Narayan lokhande were leading members and financial supporters of the Samaj in its early years. Lokhande has been called the father of trade Unionism in India.

== The Mali in Nepal ==
The Central Bureau of Statistics of Nepal classifies the Mali as a subgroup within the broader social group of Madheshi Other Caste. At the time of the 2011 Nepal census, 14,995 people (0.1% of the population of Nepal) were Mali. The frequency of Malis by province was as follows:

- Madhesh Province (0.2%)
- Bagmati Province (0.0%)
- Gandaki Province (0.0%)
- Koshi Province (0.0%)
- Lumbini Province (0.0%)
- Karnali Province (0.0%)
- Sudurpashchim Province (0.0%)

The frequency of Malis was higher than national average (0.1%) in the following districts:

- Mahottari (0.3%)
- Rautahat (0.3%)
- Bara (0.2%)
- Dhanusha (0.2%)
- Parsa (0.2%)
- Saptari (0.2%)
- Sarlahi (0.2%)

== Notables ==
- Jyotirao Phule, social reformer, activist and businessman.
- Ashok Gehlot, Chief Minister of Rajasthan.
- Dr. Amol Kolhe, An Actor and Member of Parliament from Shirur lok sabha Constituency Pune Maharashtra.
