= Sakyas =

Sakyas may refer to:

- Shakya, a people of ancient India
- members of the Sakya Tibetan Buddhist school

== See also ==
- Shakya (disambiguation)
