= Ashish Yadav =

Indian politician

MLA, 16th Legislative Assembly
- In office Mar 2012 – Mar 2017
- Succeeded by: Dharmendra Shakya
- Constituency: Shekhupur

MLA, 14th Legislative Assembly
- In office Feb 2002 – May 2007
- Preceded by: Bhagwan Singh
- Succeeded by: None
- Constituency: Usehat

Personal details
- Born: 12 August 1972 (age 54) Budaun district
- Party: Samajwadi Party (2002–2017) Independent (2017-present)
- Parent: Banwari Singh Yadav (father)
- Education: UP Madhyamik Shiksha Parishad
- Profession: Farmer, politician

Ashish Yadav is an Indian politician and a member of the Sixteenth Legislative Assembly of Uttar Pradesh in India. He represents the Shekhupur constituency of Uttar Pradesh and is a member of the Samajwadi Party political party until 2017.

== Early life and education ==
Ashish Yadav was born in Bhadoi district . He attended the UP Madhyamik Shiksha Parishad and is educated till twelfth grade.

== Political career ==
Ashish Yadav has been a MLA for two terms. He represented the Shekhupur constituency and was a member of the Samajwadi Party political party until 21 January 2017, when he left the party to contest in the upcoming Assembly election.

== Posts held ==
#	From	To	Position	Comments
01	2012	2017	Member, 16th Legislative Assembly	
02	2002	2007	Member, 14th Legislative Assembly	

== See also ==
- Shekhupur (Assembly constituency)
- Sixteenth Legislative Assembly of Uttar Pradesh
- Uttar Pradesh Legislative Assembly
