= Murao =

Murao (written: 村尾 or 村生) is a Japanese surname. Notable people with the surname include:

- Mio Murao (村生ミオ; 1952–2022), Japanese mangaka
- Sanshiro Murao (村尾 三四郎; born 2000), Japanese judoka
- Shig Murao (村尾 重芳; 1926–1999), Japanese-American bookseller

== See also ==
- Murao people
