= Saurabh Suman =

Indian Agri researcher

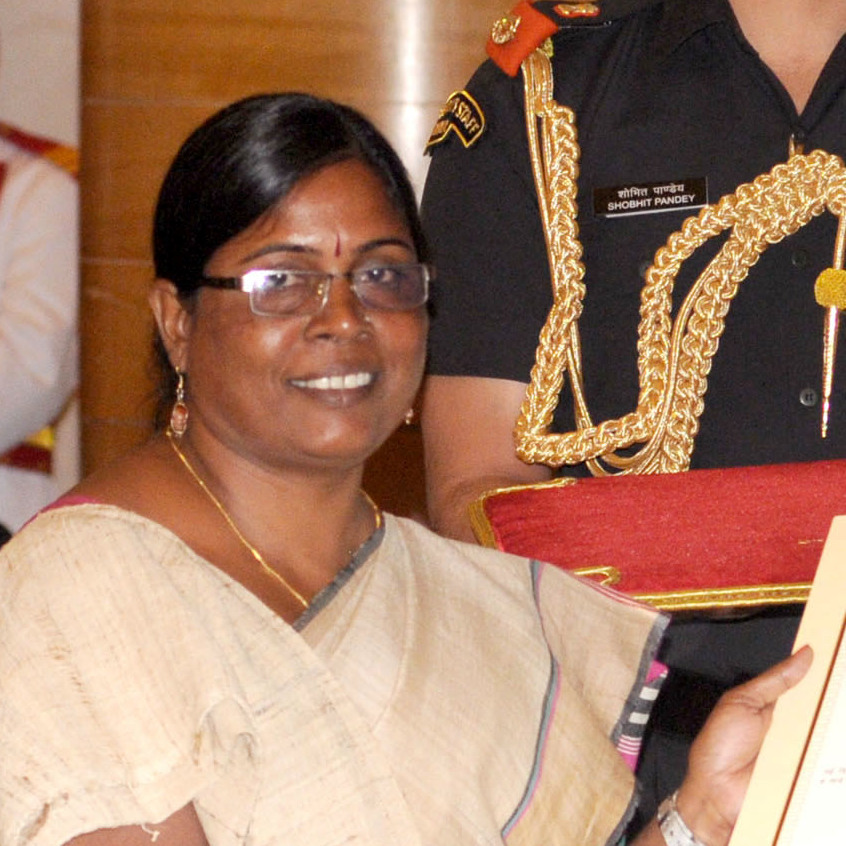
- on International Women's Day, 2016
- Education: Aligarh Muslim University
- Occupation: Agri researcher
- Known for: Nari Shakti Award

Dr. Saurabh Suman is an Indian Agri researcher who was awarded the Nari Shakti Puraskar. She leads an NGO that empowers women in Bihar. Suiman has also been involved in organising celebrations of Mahishasur martyrdom day.

== Life ==
Suman was born in a Kushwaha (Koeri) family of Bihar, but was raised in a Dalit family. In 1980 her father, Kameshwar Singh Mahto, was arrested and sentenced to death for murder. This was later commuted.

She studied at the Aligarh Muslim University where she studied agricultural science, but later decided to become involved in social work.

Suman became the secretary of the NGO, Bihar Seva Sansthan. The organisation focuses its work on the distract around the city of Nawada but is interested in Bihar as well. With her leadership Bihar Seva Sansthan organised courses in information technology and mobile phones for women and she arranged for women to take part in agricultural research for the Indian Space Research Organisation (ISRO).

She has been involved in organising celebrations of Mahishasur martyrdom day. This can be a controversial celebration.

In 2016 Suman went to New Delhi where she was awarded the highest award for women in India, the Nari Shakti Puraskar. The awards were made by President Pranab Mukherjee at the presidential palace (Rashtrapati Bhavan). The ministry for Women and Child Development had organised the event and the WDC Minister Maneka Gandhi was present as well as the Prime Minister Narendra Modi.

In 2018 Suman was accused by men who had killed Locan RJD Leader Kailash Paswan as being the person who paid them to commit the murder. No evidence was cited. Suman surrendered herself to the court noting that she had been framed and that she had not paid these men with land and money to kill Paswan.
