= Mata Badal Koeri =

Indian independence activists

Mata Badal Koeri was an Indian peasant leader, who was one of the founding member of Oudh Kisan Sabha (Awadh Kisan Sabha) during 1920 Non-cooperation movement. He, along with leaders like Baba Ram Chandra, Jhinguri Singh and Kedar Nath established Oudh Kisan Sabha in 1920, to work in Pratapgarh district. The prime motive of these leaders in establishing this organisation was to reorganise all the defunct Kisan Sabhas and make the members of these Sabhas (councils) as active part of Non Cooperation movement. He was a resident of Rae Bareli district. The Oudh Kisan Sabha, with which he was associated was third such council in the region. Author Majid Hayat Siddiqi considers Matabadal Koeri to be one of the three chief lieutenants of Awadh Kisan Sabha.

== Participation in Kisan Sabha movement ==
Matabadal, a resident of Rae Bareli belonged to Koeri caste, similar to agriculturist Kurmis, earlier known for their excellent market gardening skill. He, as a resident cultivator of Rasulpur village in Rae Bareli district, came into conflict with his rent collector, who was a corrupt man. The rent collector used to collect full rent from the peasants, but used to record only a partial amount in his record book. In this way, he appropriated excess rent amount for himself. When Matabadal exposes this abuse of his rent collector, he was dislodged and evicted from his land as punishment. After his eviction, he contacted Baba Ramchandra, who had gained recognition as peasant leader, organising peasants in various region by United Province by then. Due to effort of Matabadal, Ram Chandra arrived in Rae Bareli, where only 3.63% of the peasants had secure land tenure. Their efforts led to establishment of Raebareli Kisan Sabha (Raebareli Farmer Council) on 28 October 1920. Thereafter, Ram Chandra toured in Rae Bareli preaching Hindu-Muslim unity and use of Swadeshi (local products).

With the help of Ram Chandra, Sahdev Singh and other peasant leaders, Matabadal arraigned himself against the landlords and when colonial police and state intervened in the favour of landlords, they also confronted them.

It was in peasant castes like Muraos and Kurmis, who had long tradition of independence and caste solidarity, that Kisan Sabha movement initially took it roots. Records indicates that Koeris and similar agricultural castes came from long distance to lodge their grievances to the Kisan congresses that were organised to support the peasant cause. One similar Kisan Congress was organised in Ayodhya in December 2020, in which, Koeris assembled in large numbers. The Kisan Sabha leaders initially found it difficult to arrange for feeding and shelter for such large numbers of peasants, who came from distant places. Under the direction of Baba Ramchandra, Matabadal Koeri played important role in collecting RS. 6,000 from the Koeris for their upkeep.
