= Triveni Sangh =

Social reform movement

The official mouthpiece of the Triveni Sangh.

The Triveni Sangh was a caste coalition and political party established in the Shahabad District of Bihar in pre-independence India to give voice to the political solidarity of "middle peasant castes" as well as to carve a space in democratic politics for the lower castes. The date for the formation of the Triveni Sangh has been variously stated. Some sources have said it was the 1920s but Ashwani Kumar notes recently discovered documentation that makes 1933 more likely, while Christophe Jaffrelot argues for 1934. The leaders associated with the formation of this front were Yadunandan Prasad Mehta, Shivpujan Singh and Jagdev Singh Yadav.

== Formation ==
The Triveni Sangh was formed in 1934 by the members of the three prominent Backward Castes of Bihar: Yadavs, Kushwahas (Koeris) and Kurmis. Its nomenclature was derived from the confluence of the three mighty rivers viz. the Ganga, Yamuna and the mythical Saraswati River at Allahabad. The Sangh claimed of having at least one million dues-paying members. Its formation was countered by the formation of the Indian National Congress's backward class federation, which was established at the same time. The party took part in the 1937 elections and lost many seats, but managed to win at places like Arrah and Piro in Shahabad District. As a result of this, the upper castes reacted violently. In the meantime the party was also affected due to double-edged confrontations emerging out of the disunity between the three allied castes, and the superior organisational structure of Congress. According to political analysts, the superiority complex in Yadavs created difference between them and the Kurmis and Koeris, which led to the decline of the organisation, which had claimed that it was the first political establishment of the backward castes in Bihar.

== History ==
The formation of the organization had roots emerging from the Lakhochak riot in 1925. In this village in Munger district, a caste council meeting of Yadavs was seen by local Bhumihar landlords as a challenge to their social and ritual position, who were also wary of the sanskritizing trend observed in what was a ritually unpure caste. Also, the upper caste saw this new trend as a possible barrier for the illegitimate dues they obtained from these peasant castes in the form of Begar, i.e., free labor, as well as the supply of agricultural surpluses like Ghee, Milk and other such products.

In the second conference of the Sangh held at Ekwaari village, it promised to fight for the cause of the Kisan (peasants), Mazdoor (labourers) and small traders. It also protested against social oppression, especially the rapes of lower caste women by upper caste landlords. In many districts of Bihar it became a symbol of the rising political ambition of backward castes. It also published its mouthpiece called the "Triveni Sangh Ka Bigul".

=== Development of anti-Congress stance ===
The Congress party in the decades after independence was dominated by upper castes, who were responsible for the seizure of all opportunities from backward castes for political representation. When the leaders of backward castes sought to obtain tickets from the Congress for contesting in any elections, they were always denied on the grounds of being ineligible. According to Hindi novelist Omprakash Kashyap, even if they fulfilled all the grounds for eligibility, they were told that the legislature is not the place where vegetables are sown, cattle bred and milked as well as oil and salt sold. This was an indirect attack on the traditional professions of the backward castes.

The ticket distribution the Congress thus was in the favour of the upper castes, and many a times they sidelined popular backward caste leaders in order to pave the way for the upper castes to rise in power. This was witnessed when the Kurmi leader Deosharan Singh was sidelined in order to make way for a Bhumihar leader, whom another Kurmi leader Ramlakhan had defeated earlier. Numerous such incidents made backward castes staunch supporters of the Triveni Sangh.

=== Merger with the Congress ===
However, the rift between Congress and the Triveni Sangh was not insurmountable, as claimed by William Pinch, and the latter, after performing badly in elections against the Congress, merged with the Congress led Backward Class Federation. The merger, though it ended in the demise of the Sangh, brought some positive consequences for the three castes involved in its formation. The Triveni Sangh leaders were given posts in the organisation by the 1940s, and in the subsequent elections, the leaders of Kurmi, Yadav and Kushwaha castes were allotted tickets from the Congress. The loss in independent identity was compensated by the gain in terms of direct access to political power.

There was also an attempt to unify the Triveni Sangh with the Kisan Sabha, which didn't take place because of the natural rivalry and mutual antagonism extant between the Bhumihars, who dominated the Kisan Sabha, and the Yadav, Kurmi and Koeri people. Hence, despite having the same economic motives, the union and the cooperation between both organisations remained unsuccessful.

== Social impact ==
In the 1927 and 1933 district board elections, the Sangh fielded its candidates against upper-caste candidates, but was not very successful. Its charm after independence faded, but its short span made it clear that the dominance of the upper castes would not sustain forever.

The Triveni Sangh movement of 1930 is said to have sowed the seeds of political consciousness among the Koeri, Kurmi and Yadav castes of Bihar, which are variously described as upper backwards. The movement further paved the way for these castes to challenge the muscle power of "upper castes" in later years, when Ram Manohar Lohia led the political front against the Congress in Bihar in the 1980s. It was due to earlier efforts like the 'Sangh' that these middle peasant castes were able to stand up to the upper castes in all spheres of life, because by this time they became fully conscious of their rights. According to Sanjay Kumar:

If any (class/caste) could compete with the upper castes in terms of the social, economic, and political muscle, it was these three upper backward castes—Yadavs, Kurmis, and Koeris. The social coalition of the 1980s was much more politically oiled than the coalition of 1930, during the days of "Triveni Sangh".

In later years, there was an attempt for a revival of this defunct organisation by the All India Yadav Conference, particularly at Patna in 1965. In the 2015 Legislative Assembly elections of Bihar, the tentative alliance of the Rashtriya Janata Dal (Yadav-led) and Janata Dal (United) (Kormi-Koeri led) parties was covered by Indian media as an informal revival of the Triveni Sangh.

The Sangh's literature, which were primarily compiled by Yadunandan Prasad Mehta and was regarded as its manifesto, saw women primarily in their role as daughters, daumother-in-laws and mother-in-laws. However, it believed in equal rights for women. It also promoted inter-caste love marriages and widow remarriage.

== See also ==
- Arjak Sangh
