= Tamrakar =

Indian/Nepali/ caste of Smiths, coppersmiths, metal casters

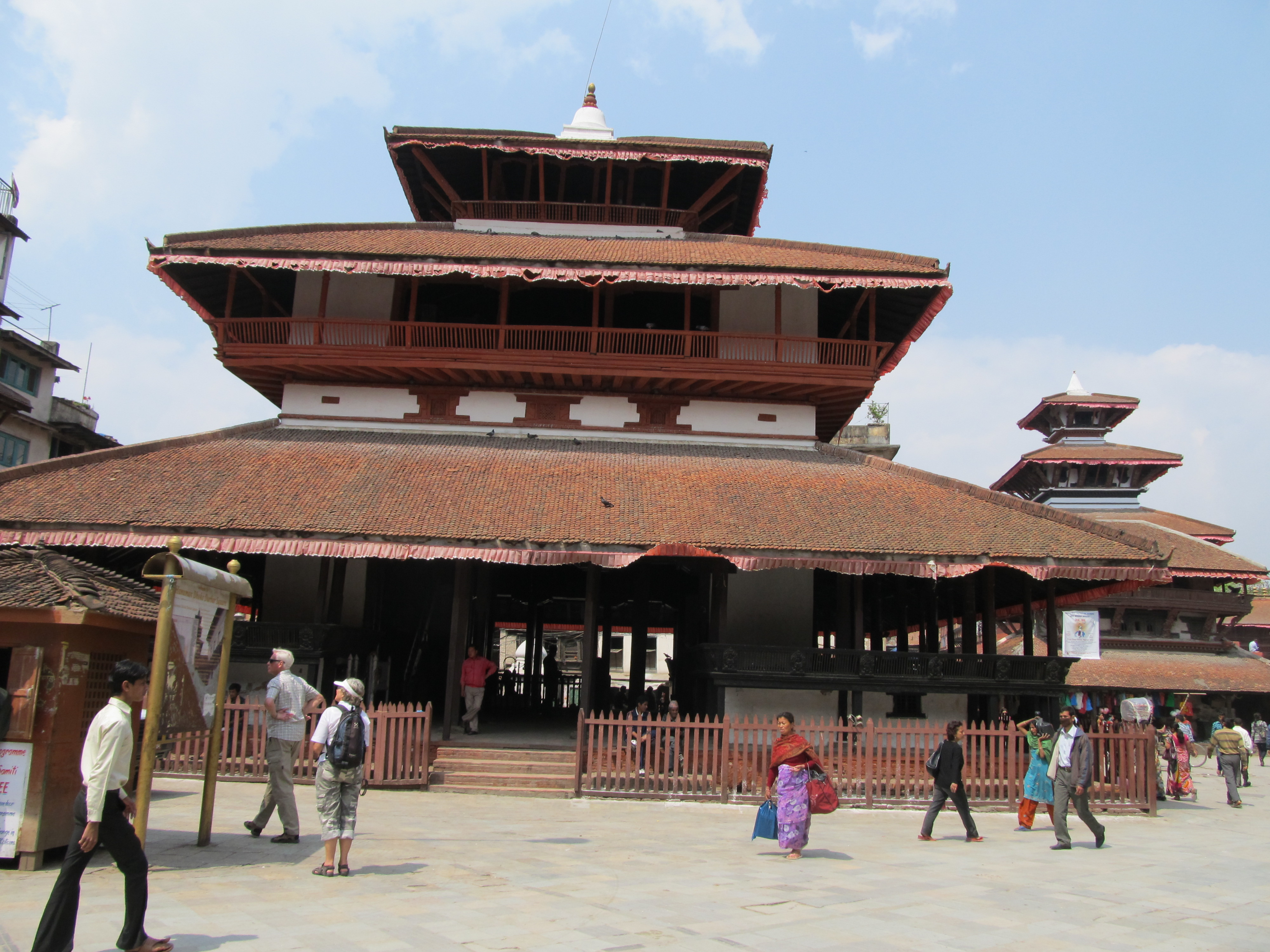
Maru Satah

Tāmrakār (Devanagari: ताम्रकार) is a caste of coppersmiths and other metal casters found in Nepal and India. In Nepal, the Tamrakars are found among the Newar community of the Kathmandu Valley and other regions of Nepal].

== Names ==
In India, the various names for the caste include Tamrakar (in Madhya Pradesh), Tambatkar, Tamera, Thathera, Thathara, Kasar, Kasera, Kansara (in Gujarat), Kangsabanik (West Bengal), Otari, Twasta Kasar and Tambat (Maharashtra), Tamta (Gharwal & kumaon). Tamta of Bihar is a well known Dalit family. In Goa, they claim Brahmin status and call themselves Twashta Kasar Brahmin. In northern India, they also identify themselves as "Haihaivanshi Tamrakar Samaj", claiming Kshatriya descent from Sahasrabahu Arjuna and Haihaya dynasty. They are included in the (Other Backward Class) and scheduled caste category by the Government of Maharashtra and Government of uttrakhand respectively.

== Geography ==
In Nepal, Tamrakars are spread all over the Kathmandu Valley, but are mostly concentrated in the heart of Patan, Kathmandu, Bhaktapur, Achham and Kailali. Tamtas are now found in the United states as well, where some have married into the US-born Indian population.

== Traditional occupation ==
Tamrakars are traditional coppersmiths who make household utensils of copper and brass according to the division of labour practiced from ancient times. Jewelry and ritual objects made of silver are other products. They are also known for making traditional musical instruments like the ponga and the payntah, long horns made of copper.

Many Tamrakars of Kathmandu participated in the traditional Tibet trade, and used to operate shops in Lhasa in Tibet, Ladakh in India and other trade centers on the Silk Road.

== Culture ==
The Tamrakars of Maru in Nepal have the task of playing the payntāh (long horn) during the Samyak festival, the greatest Newar Buddhist celebration which is held once every 12 years in Kathmandu and in which each Urāy caste has a duty.

During the Yenya festival (also known as Indra Jatra) held in Kathmandu, a Tamrakar family of Maru has the responsibility of bringing out the procession of the goddess Dagin (दागिं) (alternative name: Dagim). Similarly, a Tamrakar dancer from Maru plays the part of Daitya in sacred dances.

== Society ==
Tamrakars (mostly from Patan) have formed a society, "Tamrakar Samaj", consisting of 650+ members. Tamrakar Samaj organizes various social events like Bratabandha, Gupha Rakhne etc. as well as works actively in promotion of Tamrakar.

== History in Achhami Tamrakar ==
In 1565 B.S Bharu malla #Mahendra malla son went to 24 state in nepal Than he was lived at jumla place and He occupied the kingdom of Jumla . his son bhiya malla was born than his gemeration was rule in jumla state Shaki malla and Ashaki malla rule in state.But His son did not like this place and went to Achham district. He fell in love with a low caste girl. After the king of Achham found out, he brought down the tribe of Devau and kept Tamata. All societies called Tamata and her surname became Tamata. Devau's son Ratan Motena went and stayed in that village.
