= Baba Ram Chandra =

Peasant leader of Kisan Sabha movement

Baba Ram Chandra (1864/1875–1950) was an Indian trade unionist who organised the farmers of Awadh, India into forming a united front to fight against the abuses of landlords in 1920s and 1930s. He was also an influential figure in the history of Fiji, and owed his inspiration to take up the cause of the down-trodden to his 12 years as an indentured labourer in Fiji and to his efforts to end the indenture system. He is one of the prime characters in Kamla Kant Tripathi's history based novel "Bedakhal".

== Early years ==
Ram Chandra was born in a small village in Gwalior State in 1864 or 1875. His real name was Shridhar Balwant. Some sources say he is from Maharastra. He left for Fiji as an indentured labourer in 1904 after changing his name to Ram Chandra Rao in order to conceal his identity as a person from priestly class, since priestly class people were not preferred as indentured labourers.

== Life in Fiji ==
He stayed in Fiji for thirteen years and took active part in the movement to emancipate the lot of the indentured labourers. He came in contact with Manilal Doctor, who took keen interest in social and political movements in Fiji. Ram Chandra used religion to organise the people. He was responsible for the staging of Ram Lila in Fiji which helped in creating a sense of solidarity among the Indian indentured labourers. He also ensured the dismissal of an official who rode roughshod over the religious sentiments of the labourers. He led popular demonstrations in Fiji to focus on the grievances of indentured labourers. He smuggled into India an article on the deplorable and inhuman conditions of indentured labourers, which was published in Bharat Mitra, a newspaper from Calcutta. The Fiji Government was alarmed by this article and was on the look out for its writer. The article created such a furore that Ram Chandra was advised by his friends to leave Fiji before the authorities were able to lay their hands on him. He left Fiji in 1916.

== Formation of the Oudh Farmers' Association ==
On his return to India he settled in Ayodhya and became a sadhu (holy man). He was accused by the local police of spreading disaffection among the peasantry. He married a woman of Chamar caste and commenced calling himself "Baba Ram Chandra." He moved around the region with a copy of the Ramayana under his arm, blending readings from this popular Hindu epic with denunciations of both the British Raj and the landlords, and appealed to the peasants to act together against their exploiters. Although he began by seeking to harmonise tenant-landlord relations, Ram Chandra soon considered this to be a wasted effort and began to mobilise the peasants. He encouraged peasants to pay only the required rent and refrain from customary donations. In 1919 he led the first peasant protest against the landlords and by 1920 had organised all the farmers associations in Oudh, forming the Oudh Kisan Sabha (Oudh Farmers’ Association), with his associates; Jhinguri Singh, Mata Badal Koeri and others. He was arrested on a number of occasions for organising public protests. He established Oudh Kisan Sabha and organised farmers' protest, but he did not get support from Indian National Congress. Congress leaders Nehru and Gandhiji tried to delegitimise the efforts of Baba Ramachandra and his peasant movement, on the pretext that Baba Ramachandra used religious sentiments. Baba Ramachandra operated independently and his movement, with support of peasants, put a charter of demands with 14 points, like receipts for rent paid, not to pay more than actual rent for land, refusal to pay begari etc. He had large support from peasants and when he was kept in Pratapgarh jail in September 1920, peasants numbering 40,000 to 50,000 assembled to press his release. Baba Ramachandra noted the contributions of lower cast people in the agrarian fight against British and recorded the contribution of Pasi and Chamars in the Kisan Sabha meetings held in Rure village, Pratapgarh during 1919 and 1920.

In June 1920, Nehru toured the villages of Awadh. By October the Sabha was headed by Baba Ramchandra, Nehru and a few others. Within a month it had set up over 300 branches. It helped integrate the peasants in the Non-cooperation movement.

The peasant movement was subdued in that area after the arrest of Baba Ram Chandra.
