= Twashta Kasar =

Hindu artisan caste

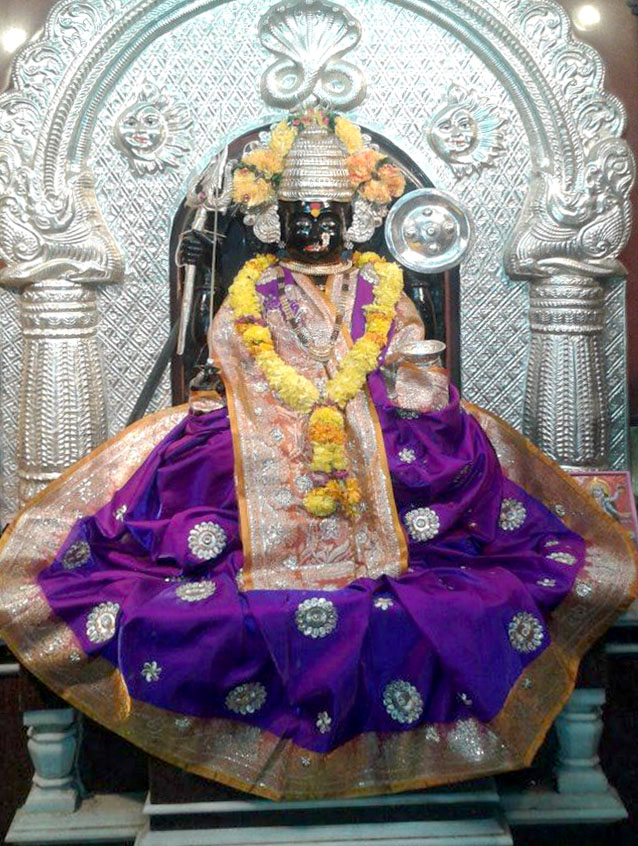
MahaKalika idol at Twashta Kasar Kalika Devi Mandir, Kasba Peth, Pune.

Twashta Kasar ( Tambat) is a Hindu artisan caste of coppersmiths (tamrakar and tamta), predominantly residing in the Indian state of Maharashtra. In Goa, they call themselves Twashta Kasar Brahmin. According to Herbert Hope Risley, they are a branch of the Suvarna Banik, who became degraded because they took to working in metal.

== Traditions ==
The primary religion of Twashta Kasar is Hindu. The community worships Kalika as a guardian deity (Palak Devta). They have established "Twashta Kasar Samaj Samstha Kalika Mandir" in every city wherever they have a sizable population. The Samaj Samstha is a community center where they organize events. In Pune, the community has been celebrating Ganeshotsav since 1893.

Although Kokani is their mother tongue, most of them converse in marathi.
