= Kabaria =

Muslim community from Uttar Pradesh, India

The Kabaria, sometimes pronounced as Kabariya, are a Muslim community found in the state of Uttar Pradesh in India, mainly in the Awadh region. A small number of Kabaria are also found in the Terai region of Nepal.

== Present circumstances ==
The Kabaria are strictly endogamous, and practice both parallel cousin and cross cousin marriages. They speak the Awadhi dialect, although most Lucknow Kabaria speak reasonable Urdu, and belong to the Sunni sect. Like other Indian Muslim castes, they have informal caste council, referred to as a panchayat. The panchayat acts as an instrument of social control, resolving intra community disputes, and punishing community members who transcend cultural norms. Each Kabaria settlement contains its own panchayat, but unlike other communities, they have not set a formal caste association.
