= Shekhupur Assembly constituency =

Constituency of the Uttar Pradesh legislative assembly in India

Shekhupur
- Constituency No. 116 for the Uttar Pradesh Legislative Assembly

Constituency details
- Country: India
- Region: North India
- State: Uttar Pradesh
- District: Badaun
- Total electors: 333,673 (2012)
- Reservation: None

Member of Legislative Assembly
- 18th Uttar Pradesh Legislative Assembly
- Incumbent Himanshu Yadav
- Party: Samajwadi Party
- Elected year: 2022

Shekhupur Assembly constituency is one of the 403 constituencies of the Uttar Pradesh Legislative Assembly, India. It is a part of the Badaun district and one of the five assembly constituencies in the Aonla Lok Sabha constituency. First election in this assembly constituency was held in 2012 after the "Delimitation of Parliamentary and Assembly Constituencies Order, 2008" was passed and the constituency was formed in 2008. The constituency is assigned identification number 116.

== Wards / Areas ==
Extent of Shekhupur Assembly constituency is KC Kakrala & Kakrala MB of Dataganj Tehsil; KCs Jagat, Qadarchowk, Shekhupur, Sakhanoo NP & Gulariya NP of Budaun Tehsil.

== Members of the Legislative Assembly ==
#	Term	Name	Party	From	To	Days	Comments	Ref
01	16th Vidhan Sabha	Ashish Yadav	Samajwadi Party	March 2012	March 2017	-	-	
02	17th Vidhan Sabha	Dharmendra Kumar Singh Shakya	Bharatiya Janata Party	Mar-2017	March-2022	-	-	
03	18th Vidhan Sabha	Himanshu Yadav	Samajwadi Party	Mar-2022	Incumbent			

== Election results ==
=== 2027 ===
2027 Uttar Pradesh Legislative Assembly election: Shekhupur
Party	Candidate	Votes	%	±%
INDIA				
NDA				
BSP				
NOTA	None of the above			
Majority				
Turnout				
gain from		Swing		

=== 2022 ===
2022 Uttar Pradesh Legislative Assembly election: Shekhupur
Party	Candidate	Votes	%	±%
SP	Himanshu Yadav	105,531	42.84	▲13.03
BJP	Dharmendra Kumar Singh Shakya	99,431	40.36	▲0.64
BSP	Muslim Khan	34,932	14.18	▼13.09
NOTA	None of the above	1,773	0.72	▼0.09
Majority		6,100	2.48	▼7.43
Turnout		246,366	61.08	▼1.38
SP gain from BJP		Swing		

=== 2017 ===
2017 Uttar Pradesh Legislative Assembly Election: Shekhupur
Party	Candidate	Votes	%	±%
BJP	Dharmendra Kumar Singh Shakya	93,702	39.72	
SP	Ashish Yadav	70,316	29.81	
BSP	Mohd Rizwan	64,327	27.27	
NOTA	None of the above	1,896	0.81	
Majority		23,386	9.91	
Turnout		235,906	62.46	

=== 2012 ===
2012 General Elections: Shekhupur
Party	Candidate	Votes	%	±%
SP	Ashish Yadav	68,533	32.76	−
INC	Bhagwan Singh Shakya	60,281	28.82	−
BSP	Qazi Mohd Rizwan	51,979	24.85	−
	Remainder 13 candidates	28,405	13.56	−
Majority		8,252	3.94	−
Turnout		209,198	62.7	−
SP hold		Swing		

== See also ==
- Aonla Lok Sabha constituency
- Budaun district
- Sixteenth Legislative Assembly of Uttar Pradesh
- Uttar Pradesh Legislative Assembly
- Vidhan Bhawan
