= Kushwaha =

Ethnic group/class in India and Nepal

Kushwahas
Regions with significant populations
- India, Nepal
- Bihar (Note: Population figures are according to 2022 Bihar caste-based survey): Koeri (5506113, 4.2120% of population of Bihar); Dangi (336629, 0.2575% of population of Bihar) (Note: Dangi is a sub-caste of Koeri in central Bihar.); Mali (349285, 0.2672% of population of Bihar)
- Uttar Pradesh: N/A
- Jharkhand: N/A
- Madhya Pradesh: N/A
- Haryana: N/A
- Nepal: 355,808 (1.22% of the population of Nepal; primarily in Terai)

Languages
- Hindi; Bhojpuri; Nepali

Religion
- Hinduism

Kushwaha (sometimes Kushvaha) is a non-elite peasant caste-community of the Indo-Gangetic Plain that has traditionally been involved in agriculture, including beekeeping and horticulture, found largely in the Indian states of Bihar and Uttar Pradesh. Kushwahas are presently classified as Other Backward Class (OBC) by the National Commission for Backward Classes. The term has been used to represent different sub-castes of the Kachhis, Koeris and Muraos. At present, it is a broad community formed by coming together of several caste groups with similar occupational backgrounds and socio-economic status, who, over time, started inter-marrying among themselves and created all India caste network for caste solidarity. The communities which merged into this caste cluster include Kachhi, Kushwaha, Mali, Marrar, Saini, Sonkar, Murai, Shakya, Maurya, Koeri and Panara.

== Origin ==
Before the 20th century CE, branches that form the Kushwaha community – the Kachhis, Koeris, and Muraos – favoured a connection with Shiva and Shakta. In the 20th century, the Kushwaha began to claim descent from the Suryavansh dynasty through Kusha, a son of the mythical Rama, an avatar of Vishnu. In the 1920s, Ganga Prasad Gupta, a proponent of Kushwaha sanskritisation, said Kushwaha families worshiped Hanuman, who Pinch described as "the embodiment of true devotion to Ram and Sita", during Kartika, a month in the Hindu lunar calendar.

== Distribution and socio-economic status ==
William Pinch notes a Kushwaha presence in Uttar Pradesh and Bihar, and they are also recorded in Haryana. Outside India, they are found in Terai, Nepal, where they have been officially recorded as Kushwaha and Koiri. They also have significant presence among the Bihari diaspora in Mauritius. The migration of Biharis to neighbouring countries became more pronounced in post-independence India. Small island nations like Mauritius have significant populations of people of Indian origin. The tradition and culture of Hindu migrants in countries like Mauritius is quite different from the Indian subcontinent, including varna status and "social hierarchy", both of which terms have several variations in Mauritius vis a vis India. The traditional ruling elites like Rajputs and Brahmins are politically and economically marginalised in Mauritius, whereas cultivating castes like Koeri, Ahir, Kurmi, Kahar, and others have improved their social and financial position. According to Crispin Bates:

The Vaish are the largest and most influential caste group on the island. Internally the group is divided into Koeri, Kurmi, Kahar, Ahir, Lohar and other jatis. In the past many admitted to Chamar status (as shown by historical records), but recently this seems to have become completely taboo. This group, now commonly known as 'Rajputs', will also sometimes describe themselves as 'Raviveds'. An explanation may lie in the rapid economic growth of the 1980s and 1990s, as well as the lack of positive discrimination measures of the sort seen in India.

The Kushwaha are often associated with the Kurmi caste, which have same socio-economic status in Bihar. Despite having some similarities, the Kushwaha and the Kurmi are different in many aspects. In the early 20th century, socio-economic ascendancy of the Kurmis led them to become landlords. Consequently, they were involved in the formation of a private army called the Bhumi Sena, which perpetrated massacres of Dalits and other atrocities. The Koeris have always led the battle of weaker sections of society against landlords. In districts such as Aurangabad, Bihar, where the feudal system was prevalent, the Kushwaha along with Yadavs have successfully led the Dalits in their armed struggle against landlords.

According to a report of the Institute of Human Development and Studies, the Kushwaha with the per capita income of ₹18,811 are among the highest-earning social groups of Bihar, much above the other important backward castes like Yadavs. They are placed below the upper castes in per capita earning. In regions like Samastipur, Bihar, the Kushwaha are politically strong and are involved with criminality. Author Tilak Das Gupta notes that Koeris of Bihar are known to be an educationally advanced community, along with castes like Awadhia Kurmi and Bania, due to more spread of education among them in contrast with several other communities categorised as Other Backward Class. Amongst various subgroups constituting Kushwaha community, Koeris of Bihar were known to be owner of significant amount of land; they were employers of Schedule Caste labourers and after the land reform drive of North Indian states like Bihar, many new landlords of the post reform period also emerged from within them. In Bihar, many Koeris, who now possess land, education and government jobs have become upwardly mobile and demonstrate upper-caste characteristics.

=== In Uttar Pradesh ===
In Uttar Pradesh, the Kushwaha community comprise approximately 8.5% of the state's population. They are distributed across the state and are known as Maurya, Morao, Shakya, Koeri, Kachhi, and Saini in different parts of the state. The community has sizeable presence in almost all of the nineteen assembly constituencies of Bundelkhand region of Uttar Pradesh, which consists seven districts— Jhansi, Hamirpur, Chitrakoot, Jalaun, Banda, Mahoba and Lalitpur.

=== Madhya Pradesh ===
The Kushwaha-Maurya community also have a sizeable presence in Indian state of Madhya Pradesh. They are found primarily in areas of the state bordering neighbouring state of Uttar Pradesh.

In 2023, the regional caste organisation of the community in Madhya Pradesh demanded that at least twenty five candidates of the Kushwaha caste should contest the election in 230 membered Madhya Pradesh Legislative Assembly. The leaders of the organisation declared that they will support only that political party which will provide appropriate representation to them in the government. In the 2018-23 Madhya Pradesh Legislative Assembly, there were eight members of legislative assembly belonging to Kushwaha community. From the Bharatiya Janata Party which was in government, Bharat Singh Kushwah and Ram Kishor Kawre from the community were ministers in Government of Madhya Pradesh. There were two other legislators from the BJP in the Assembly. From the Indian National Congress, there were four legislators in the Assembly, Baijnath Kushwah, Ajab Singh Kushwah, Siddharth Sukhlal Kushwaha, and Hina Kaware.

== Economy ==
According to Arun Sinha, the Koeris were known for their market gardening activities. Since Indian independence, the land reform movement made it difficult for the erstwhile upper-caste landlords to maintain their holdings. The growing pressure from left-wing militants backed by Communist Party of India (Marxist–Leninist) Liberation (CPI(ML)) and some local political parties; and the weakening of the Zamindari system made it difficult for them to survive in rural areas. The decades following independence were marked by the urbanisation of upper castes, who sold their unproductive holdings, which were mostly bought by the peasants of cultivating middle castes, who were affluent enough to purchase land. Some of the land was also bought from Muslim families who were migrating to Pakistan. The Koeris, Kurmis, and Yadavs were the main buyers of these lands.

Because the peasant castes considered their land to be their most productive asset, they rarely sold it. The zeal of peasant castes to buy more and more land gradually changed their economic profile, and some of them became "neo-landlords". The peasants attempted to protect their new economic status from those below them, especially the Dalits, who were still mainly landless labourers. The peasants adopted many of the practices of their erstwhile landlords. The pattern of land reform in states like Bihar mainly benefitted the middle castes like the Koeris, and was also responsible for the imperfect mobilisation of backward castes in politics. The space created by Backward castes in electoral politics after 1967 was dominated mainly by these middle-peasant castes, who were the biggest beneficiary of the "politics of socialism", the proponents of which were people like Ram Manohar Lohia. The unequitable political space at the disposal of other "Backward castes" and Scheduled Castes was an implication of these land reforms – according to Varinder Grover:

The pattern of land reforms in Bihar is one of the main reason for imperfect mobilisation of backward castes into the politics. The abolition of all intermediaries had definitely helped the hard working castes like Kurmi, Koeris and Yadav. These small peasant proprietors worked very hard on their land and also drive their labourers hard, and any resistance by agricultural labourers gives rise to the mutual conflicts and atrocities on Harijans.

The differences between upper backward castes and the extremely backward castes, and Dalits, due to unequal distribution of the benefits of land reforms, was a major challenge before the CPI(ML) in mobilisation of collective force of lower castes against the upper-caste landlords. The upper backward castes like Koeri were initially less attached to the CPI(ML) due to their economic progress, and the communists were only successful in mobilising them in regions Patna, Bhojpur, Aurangabad, and Rohtas district. These success were attributed to the widespread dacoity and oppressive attitude of the upper-caste landlords faced by these hardworking caste groups, which prompted them to join revolutionary organisations.

== Political presence ==
The Kushwaha engaged in political action during these latter days of the Raj. Around 1933 and 1934, (Note: The date of formation of the Triveni Sangh has been variously stated. Some sources have said it was the 1920s but Kumar notes recently discovered documentation that makes 1933 more likely, whilst Jaffrelot has said 1934.) the Koeris joined with the Kurmis and Yadavs to form the Triveni Sangh, a caste federation that by 1936 claimed to have a million supporters. This coalition followed an alliance for the 1930 local elections, which performed poorly at the polls. The new grouping had little electoral success; it won a few seats in the 1937 elections but was defeated by a two-pronged opposition that saw the rival Indian National Congress (Congress) attracting some of its wealthier leaders to a newly formed unit called the Backward Class Federation, and an effective opposition from upper castes organised to prevent upward mobility of the lower castes. Also, the three putatively allied castes were unable to reconcile their rivalries. The Triveni Sangh also faced competition from the All India Kisan Sabha, a peasant-oriented socio-political campaigning group run by communists. The appeal of the Triveni Sangh had significantly waned by 1947 but had achieved a measure of success outside elections by exerting sufficient influence to bring an end to the begar system of forced, unpaid labour; and by providing a platform for people seeking reservation of jobs in government for non-upper-caste people. In 1965, there was an abortive attempt to revive the defunct federation.

The Kisan Sabha was dominated by peasant castes like the Koeri, Kurmi, and Yadav; historian Gyan Pandey termed them mainly movements of the middle-peasant castes who organised against eviction with limited participation of other communities. The reality, however, was more complex. Dalit communities like the Chamars and Pasis, whose traditional occupations were leatherwork and toddy-tapping respectively, formed a significant portion of the landless peasantry and were significant in the Kisan Sabha, which also included members of the high castes such as Brahmins. The Koeris also had a significant presence in the 1960s Naxalite movement in rural Bihar, particularly in Bhojpur and nearby areas like Arrah, where an economic system dominated by upper-caste landlords was still in place. Here, the communist upsurge against the prevalent feudal system was led by Jagdish Mahto, a Koeri teacher who had read Ambedkar and Marx, and was sympathetic to the cause of Dalits.

Mahto organised his militia under the banner Communist Party of India (Marxist–Leninist) (CPI(ML)), which murdered many upper-caste landlords in the region. These violent clashes demarcated the boundaries between Koeris and Bhumihars in the Ekwaari. For much of the 20th century, the Koeri were generally less effective and less involved in politics than the Kurmis and Yadavs, who broadly shared their socio-economic position in Hindu society. The latter two groups were more vociferous in their actions, including involvement in caste rioting, whilst the Koeris had only a brief prominence during the rise of Jagdeo Prasad. This muted position dramatically changed in the 1990s when the rise to power of Lalu Prasad in Bihar caused an assertion of Yadav-centric policies that demanded a loud reaction.

Earlier, the Koeris were given fair representation in the state governments of Lalu Prasad Yadav and Rabri Devi. The Backward politics of Lalu Prasad Yadav resulted in rise to political prominence of numerous Backward castes, among which the Koeri were prominent. In this period, caste remained the most-effective tool of political mobilisation; some leaders who were theoretically opposed to caste-based politics also appealed to caste loyalties to secure their victory. The Rabri Devi government appointed ten Koeris as ministers in her cabinet, which was sought by many community leaders as a fair representation of the caste. The portrayal of Lalu Prasad Yadav as a "Messiah of Backward castes" lost traction when the Yadav ascendancy in politics led other aspirational Backward castes to move away from his party. During the 1990s, Nitish Kumar, who was projected as the leader of Kurmi and Koeri communities, formed the Samta Party, leading to the isolation of Koeri-Kurmi community from Yadavs and Laloo Prasad.

In the decades following independence, a complete shift of power from upper castes to the "upper Backward castes"; a term coined to describe the Koeri, Yadav, Kurmi, and Bania in Bihar. The transfer of power also occurred at the local level of governance. The upper caste were first to acquire education and initially benefitted from it but with the expansion in electoral franchise and growth of the "party system", they lost support to upper Backward communities. Nepotism and patronage for fellow caste members in government, which had previously been an upper-caste phenomenon, was now available to the upper Backward communities. This phenomenon continued in the 1970s with the premiership of Karpoori Thakur, who had provided 12% reservation to lower Backward castes and 8% to upper Backward castes, in which the Koeri were included. The peak of this patronage was reached during the tenure of Laloo Yadav.

From 1990 onwards, the solidarity of Backward castes was severely weakened due to division among the Koeri-Kurmi community and Yadavs, whose voting patterns were contrasted. When the Samta Party allied with the Bhartiya Janata Party (BJP), Koeris voted for this alliance and in the 1996 Lok Sabha elections, the BJP fared well, mostly due to the support of Koeri and Kurmis. The division among Backwards castes also cost their representation in the assemblies. The profile of the Bihar legislative assembly rapidly changed since 1967; until 1995 or 1996, the representation of upper castes was reduced to around 17% but the division among Backwards castes served as a hope to the upper castes to at least increase their representation. The success of the BJP-Samta coalition also consolidated the Koeris and the Kurmis, who merged as a political force in 1996 elections.

Since 1996, Koeris voted en masse for the Janata Dal (United) (JD (U))-BJP coalition. The caste-based polarisation in Bihar and other states moved the dominant Backwards castes away from the Rashtriya Janata Dal and distributed their votes to other political parties. Koeris, who were one of the most-populous caste groups, were shifted first towards the JD (U)-BJP coalition. After the expulsion of Upendra Kushwaha from the JD (U) and the formation of the Rashtriya Lok Samata Party, their votes were distributed amongst the JD (U) and the new social coalition of the BJP with the Lok Janshakti Party and the Rashtriya Lok Samata Party. In the 2015 Bihar Legislative Assembly election, Janata Dal (United) allied with its rival Rashtriya Janata Dal due to differences with the BJP. Due to the social composition of these parties and the core-voter base, this coalition drew immense support from the Yadav, Kurmi, and Kushwaha castes, which rarely voted together after the 1990s. Consequently, the coalition emerged with a massive victory and the number of legislators from these agrarian castes grew compared to previous elections. The coalition was later dissolved and in the 2020 Assembly election, the disunity among the three castes and split of votes led to huge decline in the number of Kushwaha legislators.

Though generally considered as supporters of Janata Dal (United) in Bihar, the Kushwaha community in some of the left-dominated assembly constituencies like Ziradel and Bibhutipur are also core supporters of communist parties— Communist Party of India (Marxist) and Communist Party of India (Marxist-Leninist) Liberation; mainly because of the creation of rooted leaders like Ramdeo Verma and Amarjeet Kushwaha from the community by these parties.

According to author and political analyst Prem Kumar Mani, Kushwahas are more acceptable to other caste groups specially the Extremely Backward Castes in Bihar, when it comes to assuming the political leadership of latter. Mani points towards existence of cordial relationship of Kushwahas with the other caste groups in Bihar's villages, where guests of all rural communities are sent to Mahto Ji ka Dalan (a rural living room owned by Kushwahas in popular village culture) to spend the night. As a political bloc, Kushwahas decides the results of elections in at least 63 assembly seats and in half a dozen Lok Sabha seats like Ara, Khagaria, Karakat, Ujiyarpur and Sasaram.

In Khagaria Lok Sabha constituency, a total of five parliamentarians from the community has been elected since 1957, which is second only to Yadav parliamentarians. The Koeri parliamentarians elected from this constituency are Kameshwar Prasad Singh, Chandra Shekhar Prasad Verma, Satish Prasad Singh, Shakuni Choudhary and Renu Kushwaha. In Arrah Lok Sabha constituency from 1951 to 2004 only Koeri and Yadav parliamentarians were elected. The Koeri parliamentarians included Chandradeo Prasad Verma, Haridwar Prasad Singh and Ram Prasad Kushwaha.

In Uttar Pradesh, Kushwaha-Maurya community had been traditional supporters of Bahujan Samaj Party, with Mayawati promoting community leaders like Babu Singh Kushwaha and Swami Prasad Maurya. Maurya was even appointed as National General Secretary of the BSP, in order to placate Kushwahas. Previously, Bahujan Samaj Party founder, Kanshi Ram also gave significant role to community in Uttar Pradesh's caste based politics. In Uttar Pradesh, community is known by various terms like Maurya, Kushwaha, Shakya and Saini. Off late, Bharatiya Janata Party also started promoting leaders of the community; it raised Keshav Prasad Maurya to the post of Deputy Chief Minister of Uttar Pradesh and projected him as the representative of Kushwaha and its subgroups, the Kachhi-Shakya-Maurya-Saini-Mali block. Besides these political parties, smaller parties like Mahan Dal led by Keshav Dev Maurya also claims to represent Kushwaha and its subgroups in state.

== Culture and beliefs ==
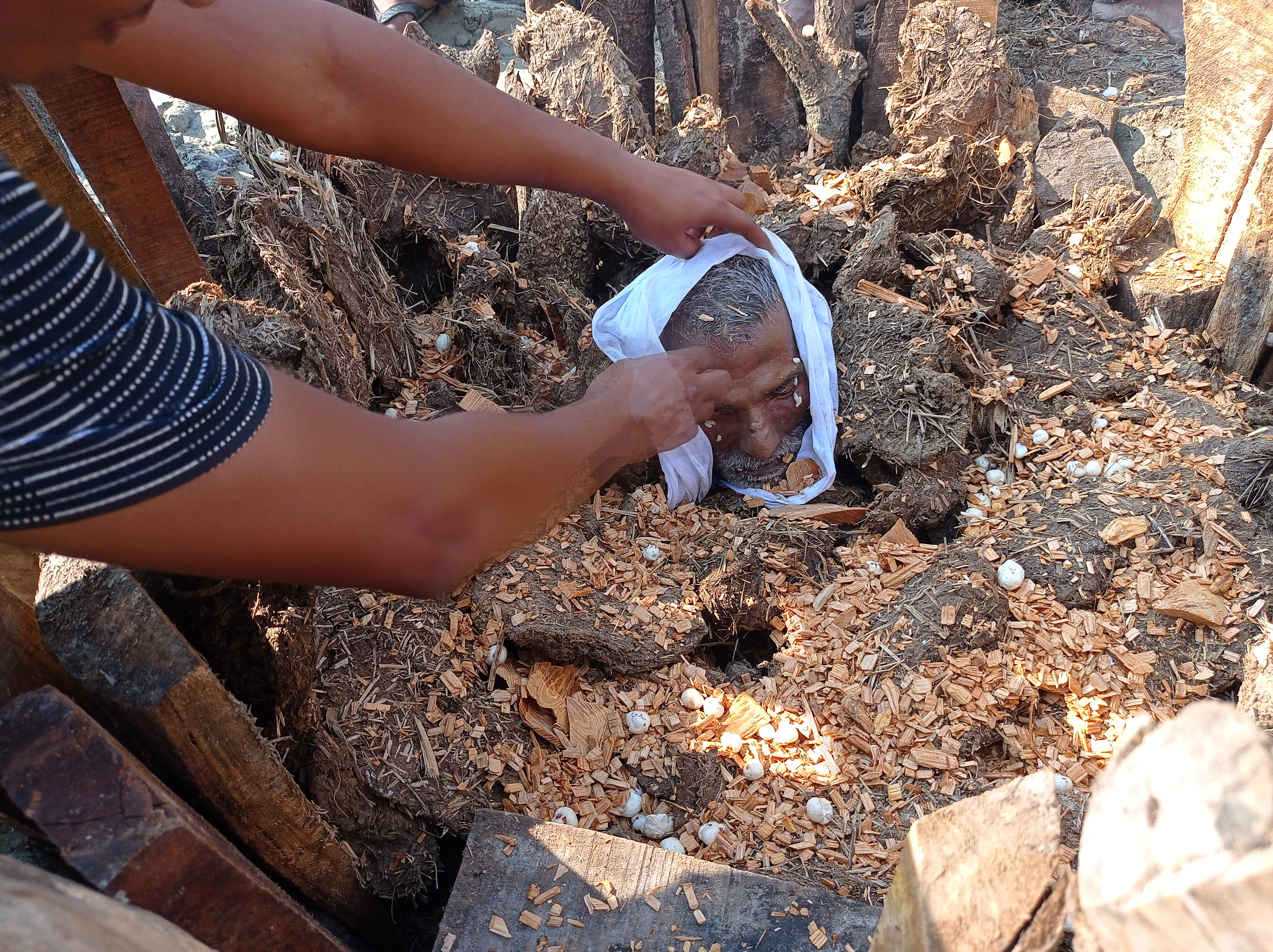
Death rituals in Arya Samajist Kushwahas of North Bihar. Unlike burning on funeral pyre, the deceased is kept in a pit, and then burnt using cow dung cakes and Ghee.

The central Bihar Backward castes like Koeri are numerically and politically powerful, and reject the traditional Jajmani system, which relies upon the Brahmanical notion of purity and pollution. The Backward caste groups in this region do not use the services of Brahmin priests to perform their rituals; most Koeri households employ a Koeri priest to perform their rituals, and their services are also used by other Backward castes like the Yadav. Koeri priests are different from Brahmin priests in their approval of widow remarriage. They also promote non-vegetarianism and do not grow tuft like Brahmins. Koeri priests also disapprove of the tika – a liquid form of sandalwood on the head – which is made by the Brahmin priests.

In recent times (21st century), Kushwahas of Bihar and Uttar Pradesh have started associating themselves with the Mauryan dynasty. The members of caste claim that they are direct descendant of the third century B.C ruler Chandragupta Maurya and his grandson Ashoka.

== Classification ==
=== Disputed varna status ===
The Kushwaha were traditionally a peasant community and hence perceived to be of the Shudra varna. Pinch described them as "skilled agriculturalists". This traditional perception of Shudra status was increasingly challenged during the late decades of British Raj rule, although some castes had made claims of a higher status well before the British administration instituted its first census. (Note: William Pinch records; "... a popular concern with status predated the rise of an imperial census apparatus and the colonial obsession with caste. ... [C]laims to personal and community dignity appeared to be part of a longer discourse that did not require European political and administrative structures.") The Kurmi community of cultivators, described by Christophe Jaffrelot as "middle caste peasants", led this search for greater respectability. According to Pinch; "The concern with personal dignity, community identity, and caste status reached a peak among Kurmi, Yadav, and Kushvaha peasants in the first four decades of the twentieth century".

=== Identification as Kushwaha Kshatriya ===
From around 1910, the Kachhis and the Koeris, both of whom had close links with the British for much of the preceding century due to their favoured role in the cultivation of the opium poppy, began to identify themselves as Kushwaha Kshatriya. An organisation claiming to represent those two groups and the Muraos petitioned for official recognition as one of the Kshatriya varna in 1928. This action by the All India Kushwaha Kshatriya Mahasabha (AIKKM) reflected the general trend for social uplift by communities that had traditionally been classified as Shudra. The process, which M. N. Srinivas called sanskritisation, was a feature of late nineteenth- and early-twentieth-century caste politics.

AIKKM's position was based on the concept of Vaishnavism, which promotes the worship and claims of descent from Rama or Krishna to assume the trappings of Kshatriya symbolism and thus permit the wearing of the sacred thread, even though the physical labour inherent in their cultivator occupation defined them as Shudra. The movement caused the Kushwaha to abandon their claim of descent from Shiva in favour of the alternative myth of their descent from Rama. In 1921, Ganga Prasad Gupta, a proponent of Kushwaha sanskritisation, published a book offering proof of the Kshatriya status of the Koeri, Kachhi, Murao, and Kushwaha. His reconstructed history said the Kushwaha were Hindu descendants of Kush, and that in the twelfth century, they served Raja Jayachandra in a military capacity during the Muslim consolidation of the Delhi Sultanate. Subsequent persecution by the victorious Muslims caused the Kushwaha to disperse and disguise their identity, forgoing the sacred thread, and thus becoming degraded and taking on localised community names. Gupta's attempt to prove Kshatriya status, in common with similar attempts by others to establish histories of various castes, was spread via the caste associations, which Dipankar Gupta wrote provided a link between the "urban, politically literate elite" members of a caste and the "less literate villagers". Some communities, such as the Muraos in Ayodhya, also constructed temples in support of these claims.

Some Kushwaha reformers also said, in a similar vein to Kurmi reformer Devi Prasad Sinha Chaudhari, that since Rajputs, Bhumihars, and Brahmins worked the fields in some areas, there was no rational basis for assertions such labour marked a community as being of the Shudra varna. William Pinch described the growth of militancy among agricultural castes in the wake of their claims to Kshatriya status. Castes like Koeris, Kurmis, and Yadavs asserted their Kshatriya status verbally and by joining the British Indian Army as soldiers in large numbers. The growing militancy among the castes led rural Bihar to become an arena of conflict in which numerous caste-based militias surfaced and atrocities against Dalits became normalised. The militias founded during this period were named after folk figures or popular personalities who were revered by the whole community.

=== Classification as Backward Caste ===
Kushwahas are classified as an Other Backward Caste (OBC) in some states of India. In 2013, the Haryana government added the Kushwaha, Koeri, and Maurya castes to the list of Backward classes. In Bihar they are categorised as OBC. Sub-castes of Kushwaha community, such as the Kachhi, Shakya, and Koeri, are also categorised as OBC in Uttar Pradesh.

== See also ==
- Kushwaha (surname)
- Mahto
