= Himanshu Yadav =

Indian politician

Member of the Uttar Pradesh legislative assembly
- Leader: Akhilesh Yadav
- Constituency: Shekhupur

Personal details
- Citizenship: Indian
- Party: Samajwadi Party
- Occupation: MLA
- Profession: Politician

Himanshu Yadav is an Indian politician of the Samajwadi Party. He is a member of the 18th Uttar Pradesh Assembly, representing the Shekhupur Assembly constituency.
