= Arvind Narayan Das =

Arvind Narayan Das (popularly known as Aravind N. Das) was a social scientist, journalist, activist and a documentary filmmaker from Bihar, eastern India.

He was influenced by Naxalbari, the peasant rebellion, while a student at St. Stephen's College, Delhi in late 1960s. Journalist Harsh Sethi wrote of him: "Rarely before, or since, at least in post-Independence India, had otherwise comfortably placed students taken the cause of the underdog to heart. Among those who were permanently marked by the experience of the ‘spring thunder’ was Arvind N. Das." His experiences in the period he spent underground as part of the Naxalites movement, shaped most of his life thereafter. He joined the Times of India as a research editor, and pioneered the books that the Times group produced on its sesquicentennial celebrations. In 1994 he left the Times and helped co-found Asia Pacific Communication Associates Pvt. Ltd. (APCA) with Dileep Padgaonkar, Anikendra Nath Sen and Darryl D'Monte. In 1995 he began travelling around India for the 18-part documentary India Invented, inspired by D.D. Kosambi's vision of Indian history. It took more than two years to make, and was a defining moment of Das's career. Das was also the founder-editor of Biblio, a review of books.

At his sudden death due to heart attack in 2000, Indian journalist Dileep Padgaonkar wrote, "But Arvind's real obsession, the one that shaped his thinking, guided his written output and nourished his conversations, was his native Bihar. It can be said without exaggeration that no contemporary Indian thinker has spoken and written about the glorious past, the dismal present and potential for a great future of this state with such lofty eloquence as he did. In his eyes, Bihar was a metaphor for India itself. At a pinch, he would have deemed it to be the very centre of the universe. While he loathed its venal, caste-ridden, ineffective governance, the violent nature of its society, its decrepit intellectual and cultural life and the slothful ways of its elite, he never missed an opportunity to recall its rich cultural and spiritual legacy, the noble character of its long-suffering people and the revolutionary potential of its youth. Two of his books - The Republic of Bihar and Changel: The Biography of a Village - bear vivid testimony to what the state meant to him."
