= Dharmendra Kumar Singh Shakya =

Indian politician

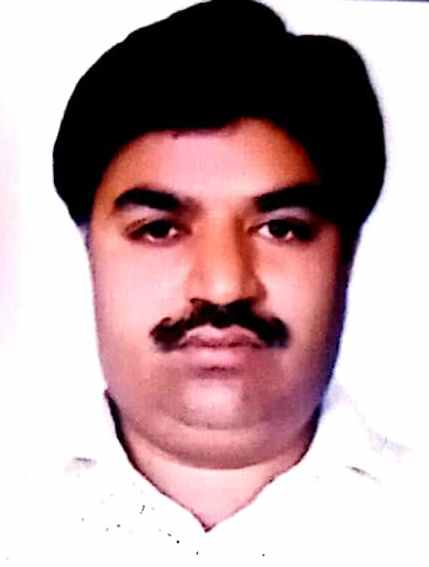

MLA, 17th Legislative Assembly
- In office 2017–2022
- Succeeded by: Himanshu Yadav
- Constituency: Shekhupur, Budaun, Uttar Pradesh

Personal details
- Party: Bharatiya Janata Party
- Occupation: MLA
- Profession: Politician

Dharmendra Kumar Singh Shakya is an Indian politician and a member of 17th Legislative Assembly, Uttar Pradesh of India. He represents the ‘Shekhupur’ constituency in Budaun district of Uttar Pradesh.

== Political career ==
Dharmendra Kumar Singh Shakya contested Uttar Pradesh Assembly Election as Bharatiya Janata Party candidate and defeated his close contestant Ashish Yadav from Samajwadi Party with a margin of 5386 votes.

== Posts held ==
#	From	To	Position	Comments
01	2017	Incumbent	Member, 17th Legislative Assembly	
