= Kachhi (caste) =

Hindu caste

The Kachhi are a Hindu caste of vegetable cultivators found in the regions of Delhi, Madhya Pradesh, Rajasthan and Uttar Pradesh in India.

== Myths of origin ==
The Kachhi caste forms part of a wider community that claims a common descent. This community, known as the Kushwaha, nowadays generally claim descent from Kusha, a son of the mythological Rama, who is considered to be an avatar of Vishnu. This enables their claim to be of the Suryavansh - or Solar - dynasty but it is a myth of origin developed in the twentieth century. Prior to that time, the various branches that form the Kushwaha community - the Mauraos, Kachhis and Koeris - favoured a connection with Shiva and Shakta. Ganga Prasad Gupta claimed in the 1920s that Kushwaha families worshiped Hanuman - described by Pinch as "the embodiment of true devotion to Ram and Sita" - during Kartika, a month in the Hindu lunar calendar.

== Present circumstances ==
In Uttar Pradesh, the vegetable-cultivators Kachhis traditionally cultivate on their comparatively smaller landholdings without aid of the animals.

In 1991, they were designated an Other Backward Class in the Indian system of positive discrimination. This applied to the populations in Delhi, Madhya Pradesh, Rajasthan and Uttar Pradesh.
