= Veth (India) =

Custom of servitude imposed upon people in India

Veth (or Vethi or Vetti-chakiri, from Sanskrit visti), also known as begar (from Persian), was a system of forced labour practised in India, in which members of populace were compelled to perform corvee labour for the government.

In the Maratha Confederacy, Veth-begar was practised on a wide scale during the Peshwa regime. Certain groups of people, such as Brahmins (priests), Kayasthas (scribes), Marathas, and Kasars (coppersmiths) of Saswad region, were exempted from veth-begar.

The system continued to be practised in the princely states during the British Raj. For example, in the Mewer State, peasants (including those from the upper-caste) were forced to engage in begar. As part of veth, the peasants and low-caste people were forced to supply water to the ruler's family; construct buildings, roads, and dams; and carry dead and wounded soldiers. The British government exempted Christians from veth-begar.

== See also ==
- Jajmani system
