= Maurya (surname) =

Indian surname

Maurya is an Indian surname mainly used by Kushwaha caste in Uttar Pradesh and Bihar.

== Notable people ==
Notable people with Maurya surname, who may or may not be associated with this caste/clan, are:

- Anil Kumar Maurya, member of Uttar Pradesh Legislative Assembly from Ghorawal Assembly constituency.
- Amarpal Maurya, member of Rajya Sabha
- Asha Maurya, member of Uttar Pradesh Legislative Assembly from Mahmoodabad Assembly constituency.
- Ashutosh Maurya, member of legislative assembly from Bisauli Assembly constituency of Uttar Pradesh.
- Bahoran Lal Maurya, former member of Uttar Pradesh Legislative Assembly.
- Guru Prasad Maurya, member of Uttar Pradesh Legislative Assembly.
- Swami Prasad Maurya, National General Secretary of Samajwadi Party and former minister in Government of Uttar Pradesh.
- Keshav Prasad Maurya, deputy Chief Minister of Uttar Pradesh.
- Munna Lal Maurya, former member of Uttar Pradesh Legislative Assembly and a former minister in Bahujan Samaj Party government.
- Ram Chandra Maurya, former member of Uttar Pradesh Legislative Assembly from Majhawan Assembly constituency.
- Rajendra Kumar Maurya, member of Uttar Pradesh Legislative Assembly from Pratapgarh Assembly constituency.
- Sanghmitra Maurya, member of Parliament (Lok Sabha) from Badaun Lok Sabha constituency.
- Suchismita Maurya, former member of Uttar Pradesh Legislative Assembly.
- Vikramjeet Maurya, former member of Uttar Pradesh legislative assembly from Phaphamau Assembly constituency and former minister in Yogi Adityanath's cabinet.
- Uday Lal Maurya, former member of Uttar Pradesh Legislative Assembly. (16th Uttar Pradesh Assembly)
- Usha Maurya, member of Uttar Pradesh Legislative Assembly.
- Vijay Maurya, Indian actor, writer and director.
- Teddy Maurya, Indian actor, writer, director and musician.

=== Bureaucrats ===
- Bijaya Kumar Maurya, retired IPS officer, Director General (Home Guards), Uttar Pradesh Police.

=== Academics ===
- Nirmala S Maurya, Vice chancellor of Veer Bahadur Singh Purvanchal University

== See also ==
- Kushwaha (surname)
