= Manzil Saini =

Indian Police Service officer

- Born: 9 September 1975 (age 50); Delhi
- Education: Delhi School of Economics; St. Stephen's College, Delhi
- Occupations: Indian Police Service (IPS) Officer Served as Deputy Inspector General of National Human Rights Commission; Served as Senior Superintendent of Police, Lucknow; Served as DIG for National Security Guards; Served as Senior Superintendent of Police, Allahabad; Served as Senior Superintendent of Police, Meerut; Served as Senior Superintendent of Police, Muzaffarnagar; Served as Senior Superintendent of Police, Firozabad; Served as Senior Superintendent of Police, Mathura; Served as Senior Superintendent of Police, J.P. Nagar; Served as Senior Superintendent of Police, Mahoba; Served as Senior Superintendent of Police, Jaunpur; Served as Senior Superintendent of Police, Etawah Served as Senior Superintendent of Police, Badaun
- Employer: Government of India
- Spouse: Jaspal Dehal
- Children: 2 children

Manzil Saini (born 1975) is an Indian Police Service officer of 2005 batch, who previously served as Senior Superintendent of Police for Lucknow. She is the first woman to assume the post of SSP of Lucknow in the history of Uttar Pradesh. She has also served as Deputy Inspector General in National Human Rights Commission. In 2021, she was raised to the post of Deputy Inspector General of National Security Guards. Saini has also served in Etawah, the hometown of Samajwadi Party founder Mulayam Singh Yadav. She gained nationwide fame for her role in investigating Amit Kumar Kidney Racket case. Saini is an alumnus of Delhi School of Economics, and she is a gold medalist from there.

== Biography ==
Saini was born on 9 September 1975 at Delhi. She is an alumnus of Delhi School of Economics and is a gold medalist in her stream. Saini joined Indian Police Service after clearing Union Public Service Commission's Civil Service Examination in 2005, and was allocated Uttar Pradesh cadre. She has assumed various positions in Uttar Pradesh Police at places like Firozabad, Mathura, Allahabad,Badayun, Etawah, Muzaffarnagar and Lucknow. Before moving to Delhi School of Economics, she completed her graduation from St. Stephens College, Delhi. Saini is a graduate in Physics. She married Jaspal Dehal, a Jat and had two children from her marriage. Saini had met Dehal in the year 2000, when they were studying in Delhi School of Economics. After completing her education, she worked for three years in a private firm, before clearing the prestigious entrance test for civil services. She got her first posting as Assistant Superintendent of Police in Moradabad. In her early career, she got nationwide fame for busting a 'Kidney Racket'. One night, she raided some private hospitals in Meerut and Noida and exposed the trafficking of Kidneys, being operated from there. She also played significant role in controlling the law and order situation before the Muzaffarnagar riots. It is believed that Saini and then District Magistrate of Muzaffarnagar played important role in controlling the situation after murder of two Jat youths in Kawal village. However, both were transferred by the incumbent Uttar Pradesh government. Their transfer was perceived by Jat community as attempt of government to save the convicts. Hence the communal violence spread at a greater pace, leading to riots.

In 2016, Akhilesh Yadav government handpicked her, given her record as fearless police officer and she was made the Senior Superintendent of Police for Lucknow. She was the first women officer in the history of Uttar Pradesh to assume this position. In 2017, new government was formed in Uttar Pradesh under Yogi Adityanath. The government initiated a reshuffle of senior police officers in transfer and posting. Consequently, Saini was replaced as Lucknow SSP by Deepak Kumar, who was then serving as SSP of Gaziabad.

During Saini's tenure as SSP of Lucknow, from 2016 to 2017, an incident called 'Shravan Sahu murder' took place in Sadatganj area of Lucknow. Shravan Sahu was an oil trader, who was leading a battle in court to seek justice for the murder of his son, who was shot dead in 2016. Sahu was sole witness of his son's murder and was consistently receiving death threats. He had filed petition to seek security from the Lucknow police, however, he was not provided the gunner. After the incident took place, Saini publicly accepted that it was a failure of the police force, which was not able to provide him security. Later, in 2022–23, inquiry into the case by Central Bureau of Investigation found saini guilty of irresponsibility. However, in 2023, departmental inquiry by a committee of some senior police officers, which was initiated on the recommendation of CBI, gave Saini clean chit in the matter. It was revealed that she had recommended the police protection for Shravan Sahu, but it was laxity on the part of then District Magistrate of Lucknow that protection was not provided on time.

In her later years under Yogi Adityanath government of Uttar Pradesh, Saini was appointed as security in-charge of CM Adityanath. In 2018, while she was working as the Senior Superintendent of Police for Meerut, she was embroiled in a controversy over her statement about a victim of eve teasing. The victim, a minor girl, burned herself alive, allegedly due to continuous harassment by her stalker. Saini, after investigation, claimed that the alleged stalker and the victim girl were earlier in a relationship, which went wrong, leading to her suicide. For her public statement, she was criticised by some of the legislators of the state of Uttar Pradesh.

She is the officer who arrested ruling party minister Gayatri Prajapati during Smajwadi party regime.

== Awards ==
Awards: She is a highly decorated officer and only the second woman IPS officer from Uttar Pradesh to receive the President's Medal for Gallantry.

Additionally, she has received the following awards:

DG'S COMMENDATION DISC SILVER in 2015

DG'S COMMENDATION DISC GOLD in 2018

DG NSG's COMMENDATION DISC-2022

DGs COMMENDATION DISC PLATINUM-2025

== See also ==
- Pramod Kumar Kushwaha
- Chandan Kushwaha
- Lipi Singh
- Seema Samridhi
- Ashwamedh Devi
- Manju Prakash
