= Lipi Singh =

Indian Police Service officer

- Born: Bihar, India
- Occupations: Indian Police Service (IPS) officer; Superintendent of Police
- Employer: Government of India
- Spouse: Suharsha Bhagat (Indian Administrative Service officer)

Lipi Singh is a 2016 batch Indian Police Service officer, who has served on various significant positions in Bihar Police. Singh is a daughter of former Janata Dal (United) leader, Ramchandra Prasad Singh, who was once considered close to Bihar Chief Minister Nitish Kumar, before joining Bharatiya Janata Party. She is known primarily for her actions against Bihar politician, Anant Kumar Singh, who was wanted by police in several criminal cases, including murder and possession of harmful weapons. Singh was made investigation incharge of the cases against Anant Singh. She had also served as the Assistant Superintendent of the Anti Terrorist Squad, where she was transferred during 2019 Bihar Lok Sabha elections by Election Commission of India. After the elections, she was reposted as the Sub Divisional Police Officer of Barh. In 2021, she was made Superintendent of Police for Saharsa district. Singh is married to Indian Administrative Service officer, Suharsha Bhagat, a resident of Samastipur district of Bihar.

== Life and career ==
Lipi Singh was born to Ramchandra Prasad Singh and Girija Singh in Bihar. She is one of the two daughters of former Janata Dal (United) parliamentarian and a close accomplice of Nitish Kumar, Ramchandra Prasad Singh, popularly known as RCP Singh. She married Suharsha Bhagat, a 2015 batch Indian Administrative Service officer. Before becoming IAS and IPS, Singh and Bhagat were selected for the Indian Audit and Accounts Service. They first met during training. After some time, they resigned from their job and restarted the preparation for the Civil Service Examination. In 2015, Bhagat bagged fifth rank at All India level in Civil Service Examination and was selected for the Indian Administrative Service. Singh cleared the examination in 2016 and was consequently chosen for Indian Police Service. Subsequently, they got married.

Her first posting was in Barh, where she was appointed as Additional Superintendent of Police. She initiated her action against criminal politician Anant Singh here. During 2019 Lok Sabha elections, Election Commission of India transferred her on deputation to Anti Terrorist Squad. This was done on the complaint of politician Neelam Devi, wife of Anant Singh. However, after the elections were concluded, she was again re-appointed at Barh. Later, she was promoted and made Superintendent of Police for Munger district.

As per media reports, she is considered close to many leaders of Janata Dal (United), and time and again, controversy has erupted over her alleged ties with politicians of ruling party of state of Bihar, the JD(U). As per reports, when she was ASP of Barh, she had used the personal vehicle of a Janata Dal United leader to bring Anant Kumar Singh back from Saket Court, Delhi. In 2020, she was also spotted with Janata Dal (United) legislator from Jamalpur Assembly constituency, Shailesh Kumar in his helicopter. It is also alleged by Neelam Devi that implication of her husband Anant Singh in cases under arms act has been done at the orders of JD(U) leaders Lalan Singh and Neeraj Kumar, and Lipi Singh followed their directives to put her husband behind the bars.

Earlier, after her posting as ASP of Barh, she, along with rural SP of Barh, raided the ancestral home of Anant Singh at Ladma village. The investigation team recovered AK-47 semi-automatic rifle, two hand grenades and 26 live cartridges of prohibited bore from the house. However, on the complaint of Neelam Devi, who was running in the elections of 2019 against JD(U) nominee Lalan Singh, she was sent on deputation to Anti Terrorist Squad. However, during her second stint in Barh as SDPO (Sub Divisional Police Officer), she initiated a crackdown against men of Anant Singh. As per reports, during her tenure as ASP of Barh, she is credited for sending nearly 700 criminals behind the bars. For her action against criminal politicians, she was compared with another women IPS officer of Bihar cadre, Shobha Ahotkar, who was known for her role in liquidating criminal-politician nexus. On her part, Lipi Singh had denied allegations of any political affiliations with any political party or leader. After Anant Singh was booked under the Unlawful Activities Prevention Act at the behest of Lipi Singh, he fled from his residence at Patna.

She again came into the limelight in 2020, when during the procession of Durga Puja idol immersion in river, violence broke out in Munger district, where she was serving as Superintendent of Police. The police were pushing the participants in a procession to complete the idol immersion as soon as possible. However, due to a minor accident, which resulted in their procession becoming late, the pile up of other devotee and procession had happened. The argument broke out between devotees and police and some anti-social elements started pelting stones at the officials. It was reported that Singh ordered the officials to open fire at the crowd. In this retaliation one youth died and several others were injured. Subsequently, the crowd dispersed. Later, in a press briefing, Singh said that firing occurred from the crowd side first. However, a Central Industrial Security Force report revealed later that it was the police which started the firing. After the incident, District Magistrate of Munger and Singh, serving in capacity of SP, were removed from their position by Election Commission of India. This incident took place, when polls were taking place in state for electing members of State Legislature.

In January 2021, after the situation calmed, Lipi Singh was appointed by Government of Bihar as Superintendent of Police for Saharsa district. In 2023, Singh was removed from her position as SP of Saharsa district and was appointed as Commandant of Bihar Special Armed Police-2. Since, this reshuffle took place after the rebellion of her father RCP Singh against JD(U) and Nitish Kumar, it was reported widely by state media.

== See also ==
- Chandan Kushwaha
- Roshan Kushwaha
- Manzil Saini
- Pramod Kumar Kushwaha
- Ashwamedh Devi
- Rambalak Mahto
