= Roshan Kushwaha =

Indian civil servant

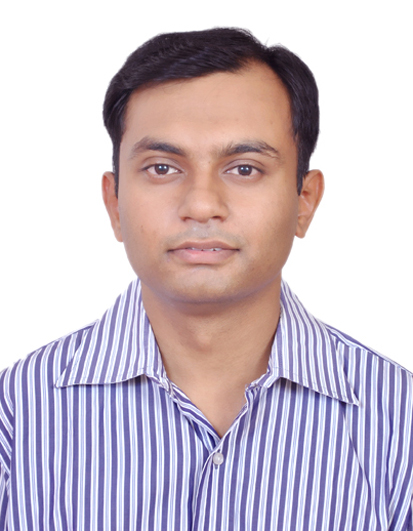
- Kushwaha during his training period in LBSNAA

Indian Administrative Service

Personal details
- Profession: Former District Magistrate of Bhojpur; District Magistrate of Begusarai district

Roshan Kushwaha is an Indian Administrative Service officer, who served as 35th District Magistrate of Begusarai district of Bihar. Kushwaha was appointed by Government of Bihar in the district in the year 2022, replacing the incumbent District Magistrate, Arvind Kumar Verma. He is primarily known for his role in implementing the developmental initiatives of the Nitish Kumar government under the ambitious Saat Nishchay Yojna. Previously, he also served as the District Magistrate of Bhojpur district, the position to which he was appointed after replacing incumbent DM, Sanjiv Kumar. Before being appointed as DM of Bhojpur, Kushwaha was serving as DDC of Vaishali district.

== Career ==
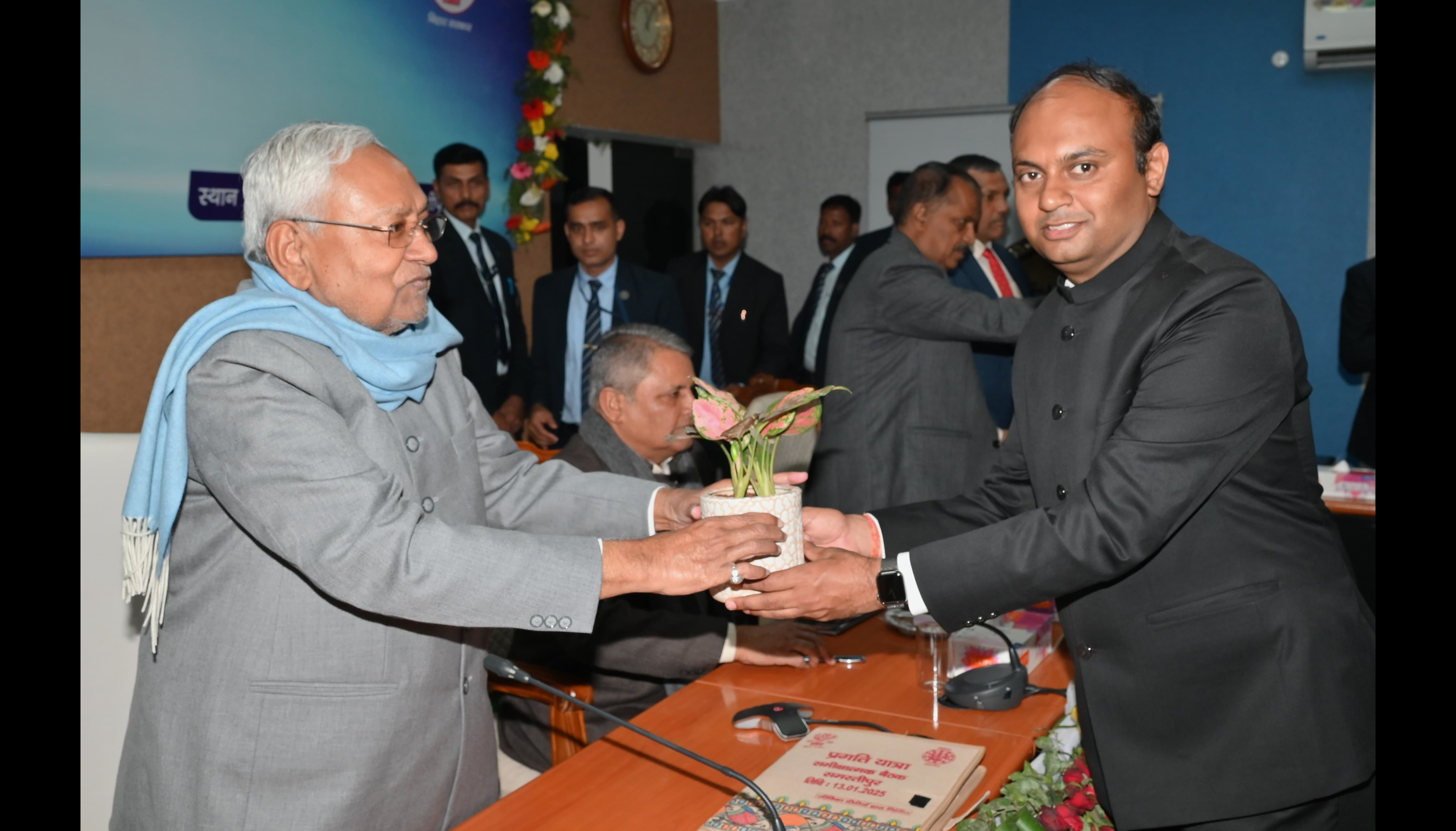
CM Nitish and Samastipur District Magistrate Raushan Kushwaha holding review meeting of various schemes in 2025 at collectorate.

During his tenure as the District Magistrate of Begusarai, Kushwaha worked for improving the medical facilities in the district. The steps such as establishment of In vitro fertilisation centres were taken to convert the district into a hub of medical facilities. He also participated in drive to make people aware of the importance of Golden Hour, after an accident. In his capacity as District Magistrate of Begusarai, he awarded those good samaritans, who helped a victim of accident without waiting for the authorities to arrive on the scene. During his stint as DM of Begusarai, a protest by students of ANM Nursing School took place. The trainees were protesting against lack of trainers in their institute, which was hindering their training. As per news reports, they protested twice, and earlier DM Kushwaha had ensured them of action on his part to fulfill their demands. However, when the demands were not fulfilled within four days, protests restarted once again. In this incident, the anguished trainees were reported to be involved in stone pelting at the convoy of DM. In 2022, a major bridge collapse accident took place in Sahebpur Kamal block of the Begusarai district. The bridge was yet to be inaugurated, but was in use by pedestrians, and small vehicles were also allowed on it. Although, no one was harmed in this incident, the collapse resulted in inconvenience to the locals in commuting from one side of the Burhi Gandak river to other. Kushwaha ordered a probe into the incident, to find out the causes behind the accident, acting in his capacity as head of the district.

He started working for proper implementation of ambitious 'Saat Nishchay Yojna' of Government of Bihar in 2019, while he was working as District Magistrate of Bhojpur. In the same year, he initiated a panchayat level connectivity program in Piro block of Bhojpur district to ensure that the targets under the program are delivered to the people at ground level. He instructed the local officials and stressed upon the two pillars out of seven primary components of scheme. These included, availability of clean drinking water for all and pavement of rural roads for swift connectivity. His thrust on proper implementation of 'Saat Nishchay Yojna' continued during his stint as Begusarai DM. In this district, he primarily worked in the area of skill development, urban solid waste management and ensuring irrigation facility for each crop field in the district. To avoid flooding during rainy season, he also worked with Bihar Urban Infrastructure Development Corporation Ltd (BUIDCO) to develop storm water drainage system for the cities. Previously, during his stint as Bhojpur DM, a new bridge over Koilwar river was inaugurated for the ease of communication.

== See also ==
- Lipi Singh
- Bijaya Kumar Maurya
