= Vitthal Wagh =

Indian Marathi poet and artist (born 1945)

Vitthal Bhikaji Wagh
- Born: Vitthal Bhikaji Wagh; January 1, 1945 (age 80); Hingani, Telhara, Akola district, India
- Known for: Poetry and writing
- Notable work: Debu, Kaya Matit Matit
- Awards: Maharashtra Government literature award

Vitthal Bhikaji Wagh (born 1 January 1945) is a Marathi poet, writer and artist. He is well known for writing in the Varhadi dialect, which is spoken in the Vidarbha region of Maharashtra. His career spans over five decades of writing work which includes writing poetry collections, dialogues for movies and dramas, songs, novels and one drama 'Andhar Yatra'. He is also famous for his glass craft technique, using which he decorates walls of houses using broken glasses.

== Biography ==
Vitthal Wagh was born in the village of Hingani, Taluka Telhara in Akola district in a Maratha-Patil family. He holds a Master of Arts degree in Marathi, and a doctorate in complete study of traditional Varhadi quotes. His novel 'Debu' depicts the life history of Gadge Maharaj. He is well known for his poem 'Kaya Matit Matit' and the corresponding song from the film Are Sansar Sansar, which depicts the condition of an Indian farmer. He has presided in the past over many literary and poet gatherings and has participated in Kavi sammelans all over the world. Dr. Wagh is also famous for his craft technique using broken glass. He uses broken glasses of various colours to decorate walls of houses. He has decorated walls of many of his friends and relatives. Dr. Wagh has carried out poet dindis and other activities in support of farmer rights. He contested the election for president of the 89th Annual Marathi Sahitya Sammelan to be held in Pimpri Chinchwad. However he was defeated by Dr. Shripal Sabnis, about which he criticised on a possible error in the electoral process.

== Works ==
=== Poetry collections ===
- Saay
- Vedarbhi
- Kaya Matit Matit
- Kapashichi Chandrafule
- Pauspani
- Vrushabhsookta
- Gaavsheel
- Mateecha Zarto Dola
- Pandharichya Watewar
- Ujedache Daan Dyawe
- tifan

=== Drama ===
- Andhara Yatra

=== Novels ===
- Debu
- Debuji
- Dr. Panjabrao Deshmukh

=== Films ===
- Devkinandan Gopala - Plot and dialogues
- Raghu Maina - Dialogues
- Are Sansar Sansar - Song writing (Kaya Matit Matit)
- Survata - Songs
- Shambhu Mahadevacha nawas - Songs
- Dom - Song
- Zari - Song
- Vegali Vaat - Song writing (Sata Janmachi Punyai)

=== Television series ===
- Gotya - Plot and dialogues
