= Azad Hind Congress =

Indian political party

Hind Congress Party is a political party in New Delhi, India. The party launched eleven candidates in the 2007 Akola Municipal Corporation election, out of whom one was elected.
