= Akola =

- City
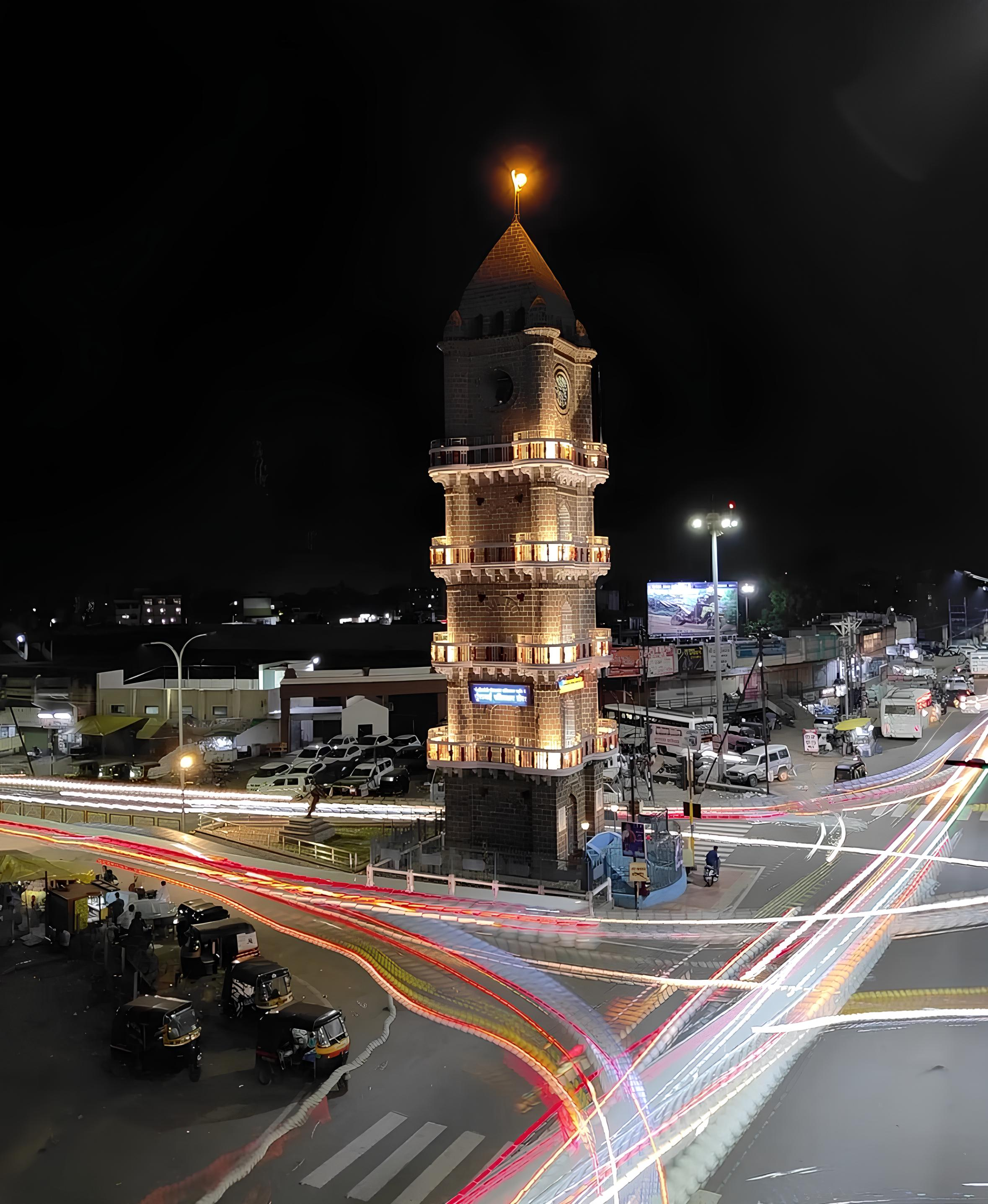
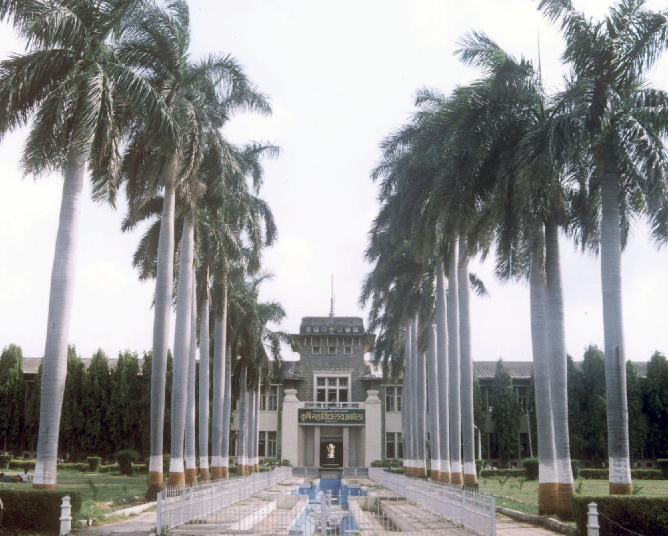
- Akola City Tower Chowk, Dr. Panjabrao Deshmukh Krishi Vidyapeeth Headquarters
- Nickname: The Cotton City
- Interactive map of Akola
- Coordinates: 20.7°N 77.00°E
- Country: India
- State: Maharashtra
- District: Akola
- Named for: Maharaja Akolsingh

Government
  - Type: Mayor-Council
  - Body: Akola Municipal Corporation
  - District Collector: Varsha Meena (IAS)
  - Municipal Commissioner: Kavita Dwiwedi (IAS)
  - Mayor: Sharda Khedkar (BJP)

Area
  - Total: 124 km^{2} (48 sq mi)
- Highest elevation: 324 m (1,063 ft)
- Lowest elevation: 287 m (942 ft)

Population
  - Total: 621,000 (Post-expansion of the city's municipal borders)
  - Rank: IN: 84th MH: 14th
  - Density: 4,331/km^{2} (11,220/sq mi)
- Demonyms: Akolekar

Language
  - Official: Marathi
- Time zone: UTC+5:30 (IST)
- PIN: 444001, 444002, 444003, 444004, 444005, 444006, 444007, 444104, 444109, 444302
- Telephone code: 0724
- Vehicle registration: MH-30
- Distance from Nagpur: 278.7 kilometres (173.2 mi) (land)
- Distance from Mumbai: 565.2 kilometres (351.2 mi) (land)
- Literacy: 91.9%
- Sex ratio: 0.958
- Human Development Index: High
- Website: akola.gov.in

Akola (/əˈkoʊlɑː/) is a major city in the Vidarbha region of the Indian state of Maharashtra. With an estimated population of 600,000, Akola is a growing metropolis surrounded by forts, and has the Morna River running through the center of the city.

Akola is an important financial city and affiliated with Sant Gadge Baba Amravati University. It has recently become a hub of coaching classes preparing students for competitive exams like NEET and JEE. The city is developing into a market centre. The primary language spoken by the people of Akola is the Varhadi dialect of Marathi while English is used mostly in educational institutions. Hindi being the language of outsiders spoken mostly by the immigrants and Urdu, including large number of Native Berari, a branch of Deccani language which is formally recognized as dialect of it.

== Etymology ==
The name "Akola" is believed to have originated from the Marathi word "Akol," which means "the end" or "the boundary." This term is thought to refer to the city's historical role as a boundary or administrative center in the region. According to local tradition, the city was named after Maharaja Akolsingh, who was an influential figure in the area.

== History ==
=== Early medieval history (Classical) ===
Akola is mentioned to be a part of Berar province and the legendary kingdom of Vidarbha in the Sanskrit epic Mahabharata.

=== Late medieval history ===
The period of Muslim rule began when Alauddin Khalji, Sultan of Delhi, conquered the region in the early 14th century. Subsequently, the region became part of the Bahmani Sultanate, which had seceded from the Delhi Sultanate in the mid-14th century. By the end of the 15th century, the Bahmani Sultanate fragmented into smaller kingdoms, and in 1572, Berar was incorporated into the Nizam Shahi Sultanate of Ahmednagar. The Nizam Shahis ceded Berar to the Mughal Empire in 1595, and the Mughals ruled the Berar province during the 17th century. The Akola fort was heavily fortified during Mughal king Aurangzeb's rule. As Mughal rule started to unravel at the start of the 18th century, Asif Jah I, Nizam of Hyderabad seized the southern provinces of the empire (including Berar) in 1724 to form an independent state.

=== Maratha Empire ===
The Battle of Argaon in 1803 was fought in Akola between the British and the Marathas during the Second Anglo-Maratha War. In the third Anglo-Maratha War, the last Peshwa, Baji Rao II, was defeated. In 1853, the Akola district together with the rest of Berar, came under the administration of the British East India Company.

=== Post-independence ===
After India's independence in 1947 from the British Government, the newly formed country was divided into different states. The Congress's proposed linguistic provinces plan before the Independence of India had positioned Akola as the headquarters of the Berar region.

== Geography ==
Akola is located on the banks of the Morna River in the Vidarbha region of Maharashtra, India. It is situated approximately 580 km (360 mi) east of Mumbai and 250 km (160 mi) west of Nagpur. The city lies in the Tapti River valley, which contributes to its significance as a commercial and agricultural hub. Akola also serves as an important road and rail junction.

=== Climate ===
Akola experiences a tropical wet and dry climate, characterized by high temperatures and significant variations in rainfall throughout the year. The climate includes hot, dry summers, a monsoon season with substantial rainfall, and relatively mild winters.

The highest and lowest temperatures ever recorded were 47.8 °C and 2.2 °C, respectively.

Climate data for Akola (1991–2020, extremes 1901–2024)
Month	Jan	Feb	Mar	Apr	May	Jun	Jul	Aug	Sep	Oct	Nov	Dec	Year
Record high °C (°F)	38.2 (100.8)	40.5 (104.9)	44.4 (111.9)	47.0 (116.6)	47.8 (118.0)	47.2 (117.0)	40.6 (105.1)	40.0 (104.0)	40.0 (104.0)	40.0 (104.0)	38.9 (102.0)	36.7 (98.1)	47.8 (118.0)
Mean daily maximum °C (°F)	30.0 (86.0)	33.2 (91.8)	37.4 (99.3)	41.0 (105.8)	42.4 (108.3)	37.5 (99.5)	32.2 (90.0)	30.8 (87.4)	32.3 (90.1)	33.8 (92.8)	32.4 (90.3)	30.7 (87.3)	34.5 (94.1)
Daily mean °C (°F)	21.9 (71.4)	24.9 (76.8)	28.7 (83.7)	33.0 (91.4)	35.3 (95.5)	31.9 (89.4)	28.3 (82.9)	27.3 (81.1)	27.8 (82.0)	27.4 (81.3)	24.8 (76.6)	22.1 (71.8)	27.8 (82.0)
Mean daily minimum °C (°F)	13.7 (56.7)	16.3 (61.3)	20.1 (68.2)	24.7 (76.5)	28.0 (82.4)	26.4 (79.5)	24.5 (76.1)	23.7 (74.7)	23.3 (73.9)	20.8 (69.4)	17.1 (62.8)	13.5 (56.3)	21.0 (69.8)
Record low °C (°F)	3.9 (39.0)	2.2 (36.0)	5.6 (42.1)	11.1 (52.0)	11.9 (53.4)	19.8 (67.6)	20.0 (68.0)	18.3 (64.9)	15.4 (59.7)	10.0 (50.0)	5.6 (42.1)	3.9 (39.0)	2.2 (36.0)
Average rainfall mm (inches)	10.6 (0.42)	5.5 (0.22)	14.2 (0.56)	4.2 (0.17)	10.1 (0.40)	146.8 (5.78)	215.0 (8.46)	181.8 (7.16)	137.7 (5.42)	42.5 (1.67)	11.8 (0.46)	3.1 (0.12)	783.4 (30.84)
Average rainy days	0.8	0.5	1.3	0.6	1.0	7.4	12.4	9.9	7.0	2.8	1.1	0.2	44.9
Average relative humidity (%) (at 17:30 IST)	37	27	23	19	21	46	67	72	65	47	45	41	42
Source 1: India Meteorological Department, Tokyo Climate Center (mean temperatures 1991–2020)
Source 2: Government of Maharashtra

Akola has been ranked 34th best “National Clean Air City” under (Category 2 3-10L Population cities) in India.

== Demographics ==
Historical population
Year	Pop.	±%
1981	225,412	—
1991	328,043	+45.5%
2001	400,520	+22.1%
2011	427,146	+6.6%
Source: Census of India

Religion in Akola City (2011)
Religion	Percent
Hinduism	54.93%
Islam	29.93%
Buddhism	12.91%
Jainism	1.46%
Christianity	0.42%
Other or not stated	0.34%

According to the 2011 Census of India, Akola City had a population of 425,817 and an area of about 128 square kilometres (49 mi^{2}). After the city's municipal limits were extended in August 2016, the estimated population of Akola city is above 603,000. The population estimate for the Akola metropolitan area is currently not available. The most recent census, conducted in 2011, recorded a population of [last known census figure]. The scheduled 2021 census for Akola city was postponed due to the COVID-19 pandemic. Current estimates are based on historical growth rates.

Language in Akola M. Corp (2011)
1. Marathi (51.4%)
2. Urdu (26.1%)
3. Hindi (13.2%)
4. Marwari (2.81%)
5. Sindhi (2.78%)
6. Gujarati (1.85%)
7. Others (1.84%)

== Government and politics ==
The local government of Akola is administered by the Akola Municipal Corporation, which operates under a Mayor-Council system. The Mayor, assisted by a Deputy Mayor, heads the corporation, with elections occurring every five years. The corporation was established on 1 July 1967 and governs an area of approximately 124 km². It operates under the Maharashtra Municipal Corporations Act, 1949.

The city's administrative functions are managed by a District Collector. As of the latest update, Varsha Meena (IAS) serves in this role. The Municipal Commissioner, currently Dr. Sunil Lahane, is responsible for overseeing the executive functions of the Akola Municipal Corporation. The Mayor, Smt. Sharda Ranjit Khedkar, oversees the implementation of policies and administrative functions within the Akola Municipal Corporation.

The Akola Municipal Corporation is divided into 4 zonal offices - North, South, East and West. It is structured into 30 wards with 91 members - 29 wards have three members each, and the 30th is a four-member ward. It was restructured like this in 2022.

The Akola Municipal Corporation presented its budget of Rs. 1456.83 crore for the financial year 2025-26, submitted by Administrator-cum-Commissioner Dr. Sunil Lahane. The budget showed an expected expenditure of Rs. 1445.91 crore for the financial year, presenting a balance of Rs. 10.92 crore.

There are several national programmes that have been implemented in Akola such as PMAY-U, AMRUT 2.0, National Clean Air Scheme and PM EBUS scheme.

Additionally, Akola has a range of local administrative services and multiple police stations operating under the jurisdiction of the Akola Police.

== Governance ==
=== Police administration ===
Akola Police maintains eight police stations in the Akola city subdivision that cover the metropolitan area of the city.

The government also approved the creation of a new Railway Police Akola subdivision that will include Akola, Wardha, and Badnera railway police units. The Akola Police subdivision falls under the Nagpur District of Railway.

== Economy ==
Akola, historically and popularly known as the 'Cotton City', has an economy rooted in agriculture and cotton-based industry. As of the 1971 Census, over 81% of its working population was engaged in agriculture, and cotton ginning, pressing, and weaving have anchored its industrial base since at least 1901; today, soybean, cotton, and jowar remain principal crops alongside pulses, wheat, and oilseeds. This agricultural strength feeds a cluster of oil, textile, and pulses mills, historic industrial units like Simplex Mill, Berar Oil Industries (NOCIL), and Mohata Cotton Mill, and the MIDC industrial zone housing around 25 factories. In contrast to the traditional picture, services now dominate the formal enterprise landscape (76% of registered enterprises versus 24% in manufacturing), with only 5% of employment coming from SMEs, and Akola ranks low (28 of 36) among Maharashtra districts on youth-economic opportunity metrics. Set within Vidarbha, one of Maharashtra's less-developed regions, marked by persistent farmer distress, Akola's economy today reflects a transition from a historically agrarian, cotton-driven base toward a more service-oriented formal sector, even as agriculture remains the primary livelihood for much of its rural population.

== Notable people ==
- Brajlal Biyani, Freedom fighter and writer
- Vasantrao Deshpande, Indian classical singer
- Anand Modak, Indian music director, composer
- Vijay P. Bhatkar, Indian computer scientist
- Patrick Barr (1908–1985), English actor
- Hasnain Aaqib, Indian poet, translator, and academic
- Vitthal Wagh, Indian Marathi poet and artist
- Sudharak Olwe, Indian photographer
- Shivdeep Lande, 2006-batch IPS officer
- Ranjit Patil, Indian politician
- Sanjay Shamrao Dhotre, Indian politician
- T. S. Korde (Tukaramji Korde), leader and landlord, British India
- Vallabhdas Aidan Mohta, Indian judge
- Mahesh Kakde, mathematician
- Swaminathan Aiyar, Indian economist and journalist
- Vaibhav Palhade, Indian author, filmmaker and entrepreneur

== See also ==
- Akola railway station
- Akola Airport
- Vidarbha
- Dr. Panjabrao Deshmukh Krishi Vidyapeeth
- Varhadi language
- List of cities in Maharashtra
- Akola Municipal Corporation
