= Anjangaon =

- Location in Maharashtra
- Coordinates: 21.15°N 77.28°E
- Country: India
- State: Maharashtra
- Region: Vidarbha
- District: Amravati
- Established: 1981

Government
  - Type: Municipal Council Class 'B'

Area
  - Total: 36.37 km^{2} (14.04 sq mi)
- Elevation: 374 m (1,227 ft)

Population (2011)
  - Total: 160,903
  - Rank: 3
  - Density: 4,424/km^{2} (11,460/sq mi)
- Demonym: Anjangaonkar

Languages
  - Official: Marathi
- Time zone: UTC+5:30 (IST)
- PIN: 444705 (Anjangaon); 444728 (Surji Satellite Town)
- Telephone code: 07224
- Vehicle registration: MH-27

Anjangaon is a city and a municipal council in Amravati district in the state of Maharashtra, India. Anjangaon City got the status of Municipal Council in 1930. It is the first municipal council established in Amravati district and the second biggest council as well. Anjangaon Surji Tehsil was established in 1981. It is technically made up of two main zones, Anjangaon and Surji, on either side of Shahanur River, and is called Anjangaon-Surji in combination. It is called a "Banana Hub of Vidarbha" as it is a large producer of bananas and a hub of medicinal plants - Piper longum and Safed musali.

Anjangaon is located at 21.1641°N 77.3159°E. It has an average elevation of 374 metres (1227 feet).

== History ==
Anjangaon Surji is an ancient town having religious and historical importance. After the Battle of Assaye and the Battle of Argaum, the Treaty of Surji-Anjangaon was signed on 30 December 1803 at Anjangaon between the British and Daulat Rao Sindhia, chief of the Maratha people. In 18th century Vithoji Narayan was awarded the vatandari of Anjangaon. There are records that he was awarded with a title 'Surji'. Anjangaon is mentioned as one of 46 Mahals of Vidarbha in Ain-i-Akbari. The revenue of Anjangaon as mentioned in Ain-i-Akbari was 32 lakhs. The river Shahanoor on the banks of which Anjangaon is located, was historically named as Sharneera (meaning river generated by an arrow ). A popular story exists that during the year of banishment, Arjuna generated the water stream by hitting the soil by an arrow.

The Devnath Math in Surji was established in 1754 AD. Saint Ruplal Maharaj established a famous Vitthal Mandir in this town. This is a city of betel leaves. Previously betel leaves were exported from here to Indonesia, Pakistan and Arabian countries. Now this place is known for cultivation of Piper longum, a medicinal plant.

According to Imperial Gazetteer of India (William Wilson Hunter), "in the year 1881, the population of Anjangaon was 9842 consisting of 5060 males and 4782 females. Of the total population, 7714 were returned as Hindus, 1955 Muslims, 6 Sikhs, and 167 Jains. A mart for cotton cloth, excellent basket-work, and pan grown in the adjacent garden lands. Large weekly market".

Anjangaon City got the status of Municipal Council in 1930. It is the first municipal council established in Amravati district & the second biggest council as well. Anjangaon Surji Tehsil was established in 1981.

== Demographics ==
As of 2011 India census, Anjangaon had a population of 160,903 in total of urban and rural. Rural area had a population of 104,523. It is the third most populous city in Amravati District after Amravati and Achalpur(Paratwada). 29,017 are males while 27,363 are females. Anjangaon has a literacy rate of 88.93%, higher than the state average of 82.34%; with 91.01% of the males and 86.72% of females literate. 11.58% of the population is under 6 years of age. According to previous census, population of Anjangaon was 51,380 (2001), 41,674 (1991), 27,897(1971), 21,931(1961) and 11,881(1901).

Year	Male	Female	Total Population	Change	Religion (%)							
Year	Male	Female	Total Population	Change	Hindu	Muslim	Christian	Sikhs	Buddhist	Jain	Other religions and persuasions	Religion not stated
2001	26613	24557	51170	-	60.463	33.697	0.193	0.006	4.698	0.922	0.020	0.000
2011	35100	33280	68380	0.102	58.780	35.520	0.287	0.011	4.479	0.731	0.021	0.172

== Notable places ==
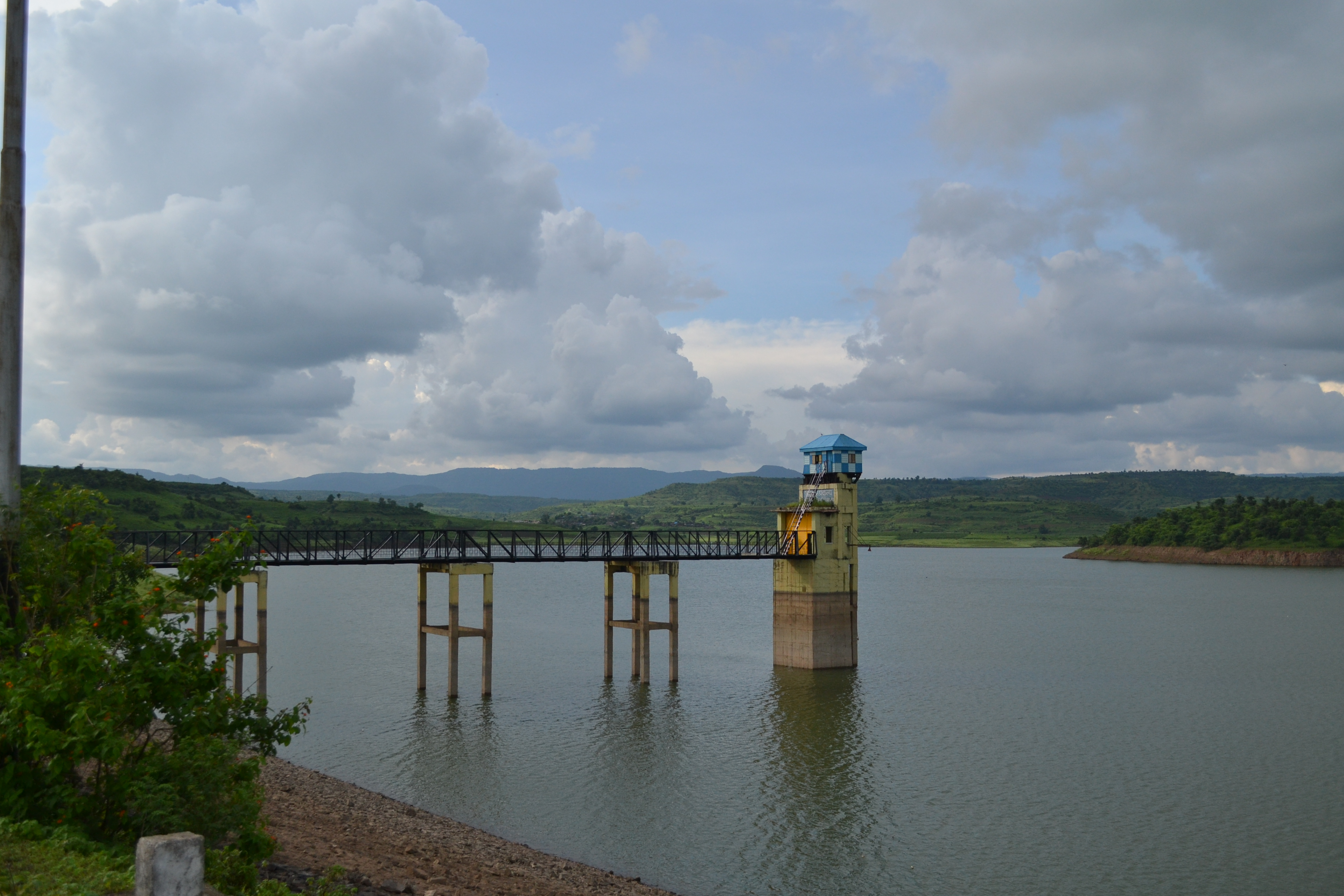
Shahanur Dam Image

Shahanoor Dam (8 km): This dam is built using soil and has a hydroelectricity generation project and water supply project for nearly 156 villages and 2 cities based on gravitation without using electricity. The dam is located in the north of the city in the ranges of Satpuda.

The city has a few religious and spiritual places which are tourist destinations due to their beauty.

- Digambar Jain Mandir, Sawkar Pura - very old temple with Adinath Bhawgan idol (replicate of Keshariyaji Idol) .
- Devnath Math, Surji: established in 1754 by Devnath Maharaj.
- Shendgaon an ancient village popularly known for being the birthplace of Gadge Maharaj

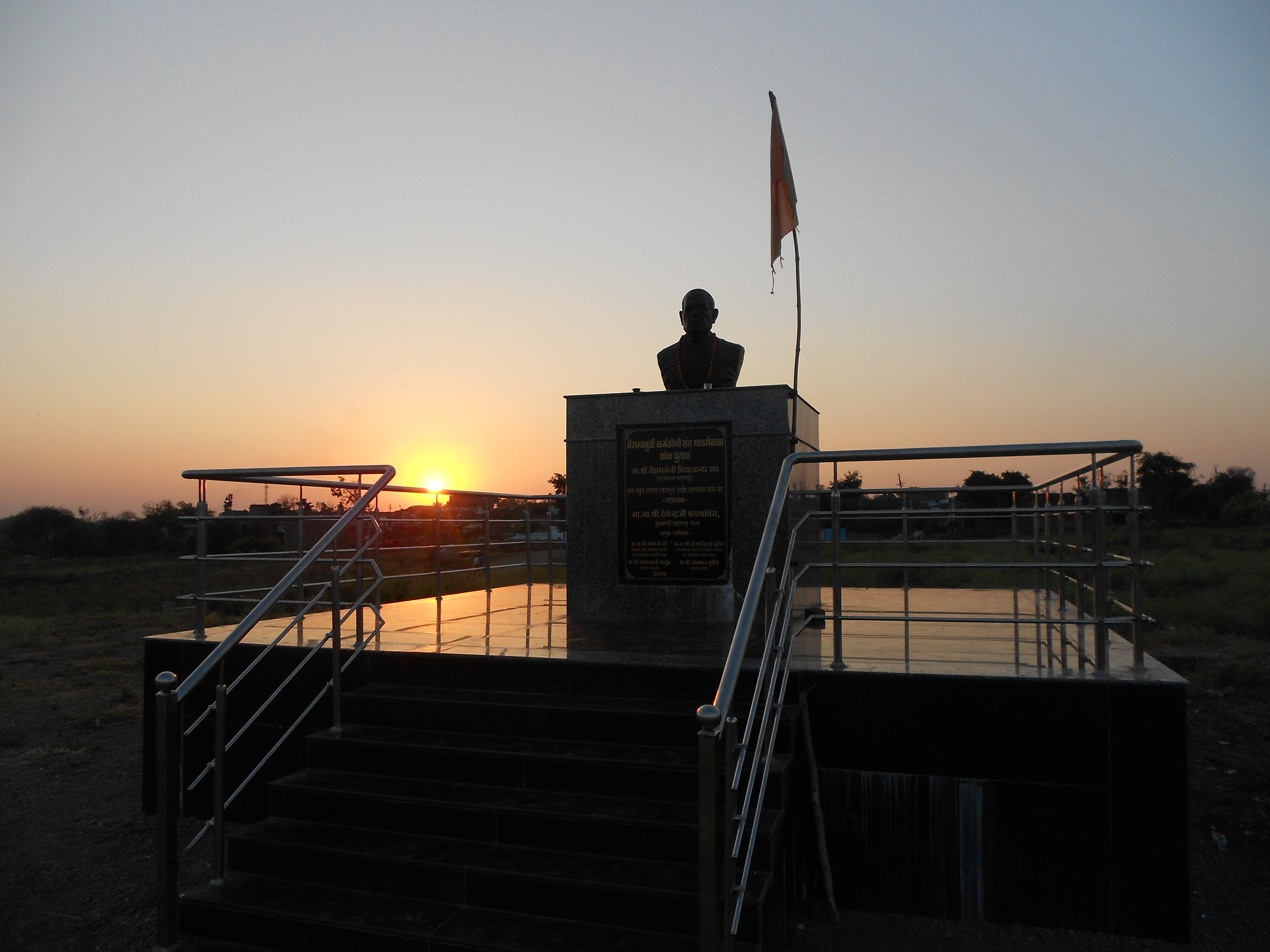
Sant Gadge Maharaj statue

- Tulja Bhavani Mata mandir(Rathod).
- Vitthal Mandir: This temple was established by Ruplal Maharaj.
- Sri Munje Baba Temple (Pan Atai): Small temple situated in the neighborhood of pan atai. Family deity of Sumele and was established by Mr. Santosh Sumele.
- Ekvira Devi Temple, Murha
- Shri Deonath Maharaj Math, Surji
- Gulab Baba Aashram, Takarkheda More

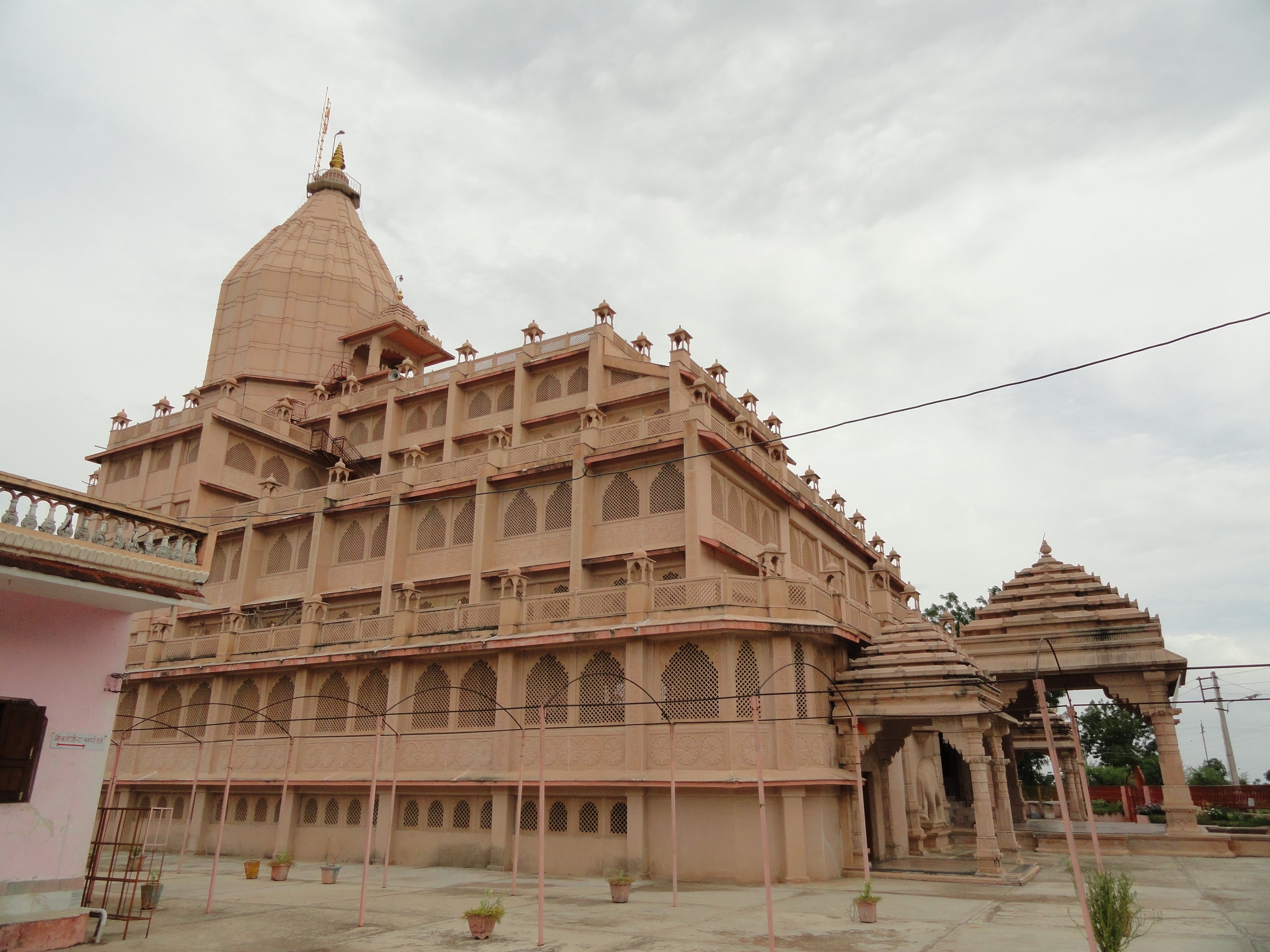
A view of Gulab Baba Ashram Takarkheda More, Anjangaon Surji

- Shri Ganpati Devasthan, Borala
- Shri Balaji Sansthan, Kathipura
- Digambar Kaanch Temple, Saokar Peth
- Shri Sant Chandrabhaga Mata Temple, Kumbhargaon
- Murha Devi Mandir, Murha

== Education ==
The first school in the city was started in 1868. This school, situated in Saokar Peth, is currently run as a Government school for girls. There are many educational institutions in the city, among which Sitabai Sangai High School, Junior College and Radhabai Sarda College are the most popular along with Vidyaniketan College Of Pharmacy.

The following is a list of schools and colleges in the area:

Sitabai Sangai Highschool

- Nagar Parishad Urdu High School Killa
- Sitabai Sangai Kanya Shala
- Sitabai Sangai Prathamik Shala
- Sitabai Sangai Jr. college. Sangai Naka Rd.
- Raisaheb Moti Sangai English School
- Smt. Radhabai Sarda College of Arts, Commerce and Science, Deogire Nagar.
- Vidyaniketan College Of Pharmacy.
- Pragtik Vidyalaya, Main Rd.
- Green Hearts School (Gurukul), Vrindavan, achalpur Rd.,
- Srinath jr. College, City Rd.,
- Dnyanpith D.Ed. College. panchayat samiti rd.,
- St. Mary's English School.Arokia Matha Church Compound, Daryapur Road
- Smt.K.S.English School, station Rd.,
- Smt. Panchfulabai Harne Jr. College, Rest House Rd.,
- Smt.Radhabai Sarda Jr.College, Deogire Nagar.,
- Dnyanpith English School.Station Rd.
- Shrirang Chitrakala Mahavidyalaya, station rd.,
- Govt.Institute of Tech. Industries, MIDC Rd.,
- Arts College, Tower Rd.,
- Smt.Indira Gandhi Technical College, Alkari Wada, P.O.rd.,
- Shri.Maniklalji Sarda D.Ed.College, Deogire Nagar.,
- Sri. Chintamani D.Ed. College, near Vyenktesh theater.
- Rashtra Sant Tukdoji D.Ed. College, tehsil rd., Surji.
- Dr. Sufi Urdu junior college Arts & science.
- Shantabai Shrivastava English School, Near water tank, Surji.
- Study Circle Convent, Surji.

- Shreenath High school, Surji
- Shri Sakharam maharaj primary school, Surji
- Vidhyaniketan Junior College of commerce and Science, Takarkheda Naka.
- Vidhyaniketan College Of Pharmacy, Takarkheda road, Anjangaon Surji.

== Banking ==
There are a seven nationalized banks as well as co-operative banks in the city. A short list includes

- State Bank of India (SBI),
- Central Bank of India (CBI),
- Bank of Maharashtra (BOM),
- India Post Payment Bank (IPPB) by Department of Post,
- Amravati District Co-operative Bank (ADCC),
- Union Bank of India (UBI),
- Bank of India (BOI),
- HDFC,
- Axis Bank,
- Khmagaon Urban Co-operative Bank,
- Buldhana Urban Co-operative Bank,
- Janata Sahakari Bank.
- Pusad Urban Co-operative bank

== Culture ==
In Surji area Dwarkeshwar Yatra is a major event to be held every year on second day of Pola festival. Various religious functions are celebrated like Piwali Marbat, Rupalal Punyatithi, Chaitra Paurnima Rathotsav of Jains etc. Kathichi Jatra is a fair cum festival of the city. The fair is organised on every Monday from Nagapanchami to Pola Festival.

== Industry ==
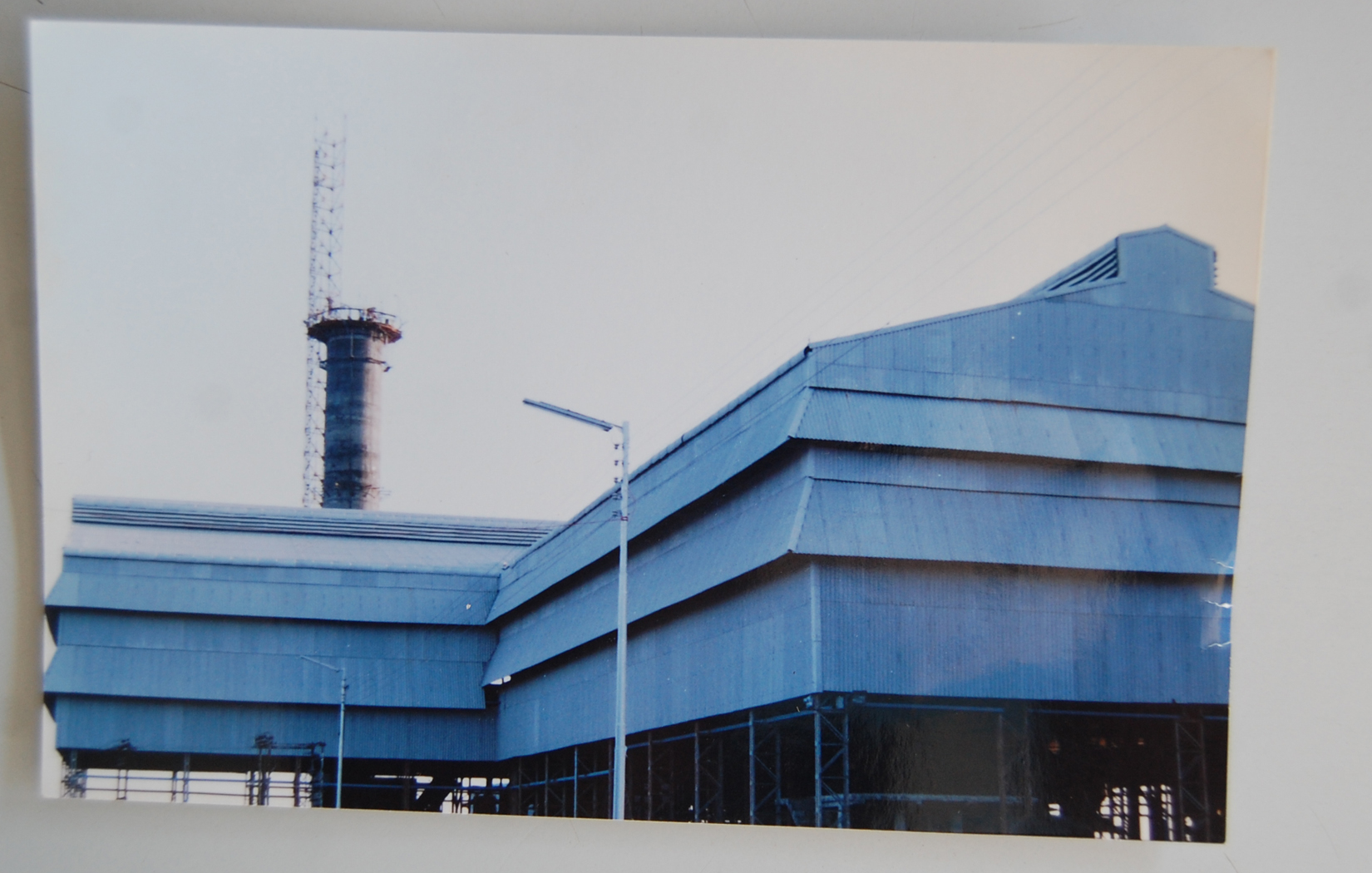
Ambadevi Sahakari Sakhar Karkhana OLD Photo

There is a co-operative sugar factory named as "Ambadevi Sahakari Sakhar Karkhana" which is not operational currently. The cotton ginning and pressing companies, sawmills, oil mills are the main industries in the area. There are a few fruit packaging and agro product's companies.

== Fruit cultivation and marketing ==
Anjangaon Surji is famous for bananas and oranges. Anjangaon is the main centre for the supply of bananas in Maharashtra along with Jalgaon. Bananas are supplied across north India (Haryana, Uttar Pradesh, Jammu, Punjab, Uttarakhand, Bihar, Chhattisgarh, Madhya Pradesh, and Delhi) and Nepal from here. Anjangaon Surji is also one of the leading place for production of long pepper (Piper longum, or Pippali), sometimes called Indian long pepper, is a flowering vine in the family Piperaceae, is also cultivated for its fruit, which is usually dried and used as a spice and seasoning.

== Transport ==
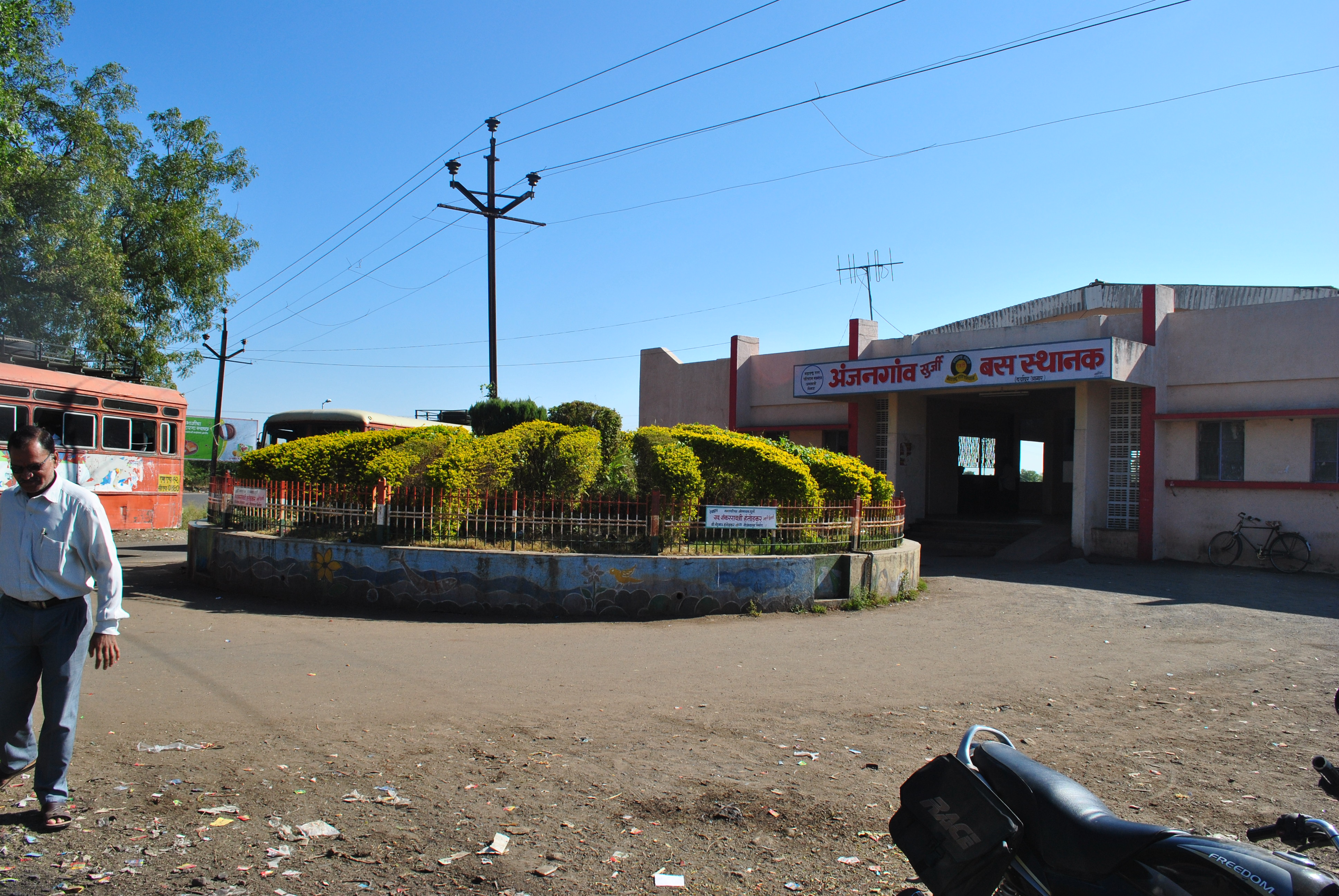
Anjangaon Surji Bus Stand

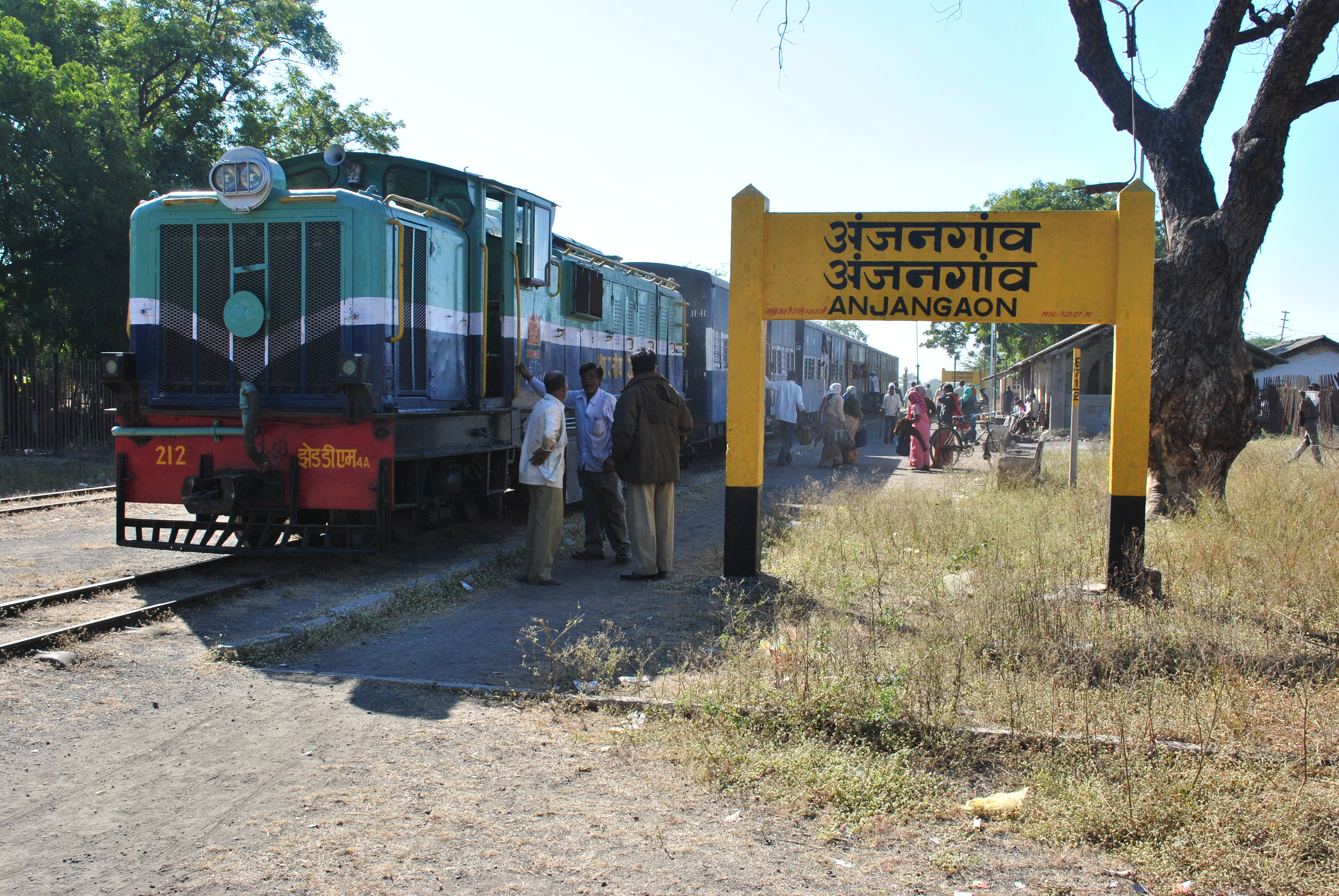
Anjangaon Railway Station

Anjangaon is connected to Betul (101 km) and Khamgaon (101 km) via National Highway 548C Amravati (82 km) and Akola (85 km) by roadways. The state transport (MSRTC) buses ply from Anjangaon to Amravati, Paratwada, Akola, Akot, Ramtek, Yavatmal, Pandharkavada, Nagpur, Aurangabad etc. Some private travel agencies run bus services to Pune and Mumbai. Anjangaon Surji is a station of Bhusaval–Nagpur section of Central Railway on Achalpur-Murtijapur narrow gauge railway route. This narrow gauge train is popularly known as Shakuntala Express. Nearest broad gauge railway station is Murtijapur(50 km).

Nearest airports are Amravati Airport (82 km), Akola Airport (85 km) and Nagpur Airport (250 km).
