= Ramchandra Prasad Singh =

Indian politician and former bureaucrat

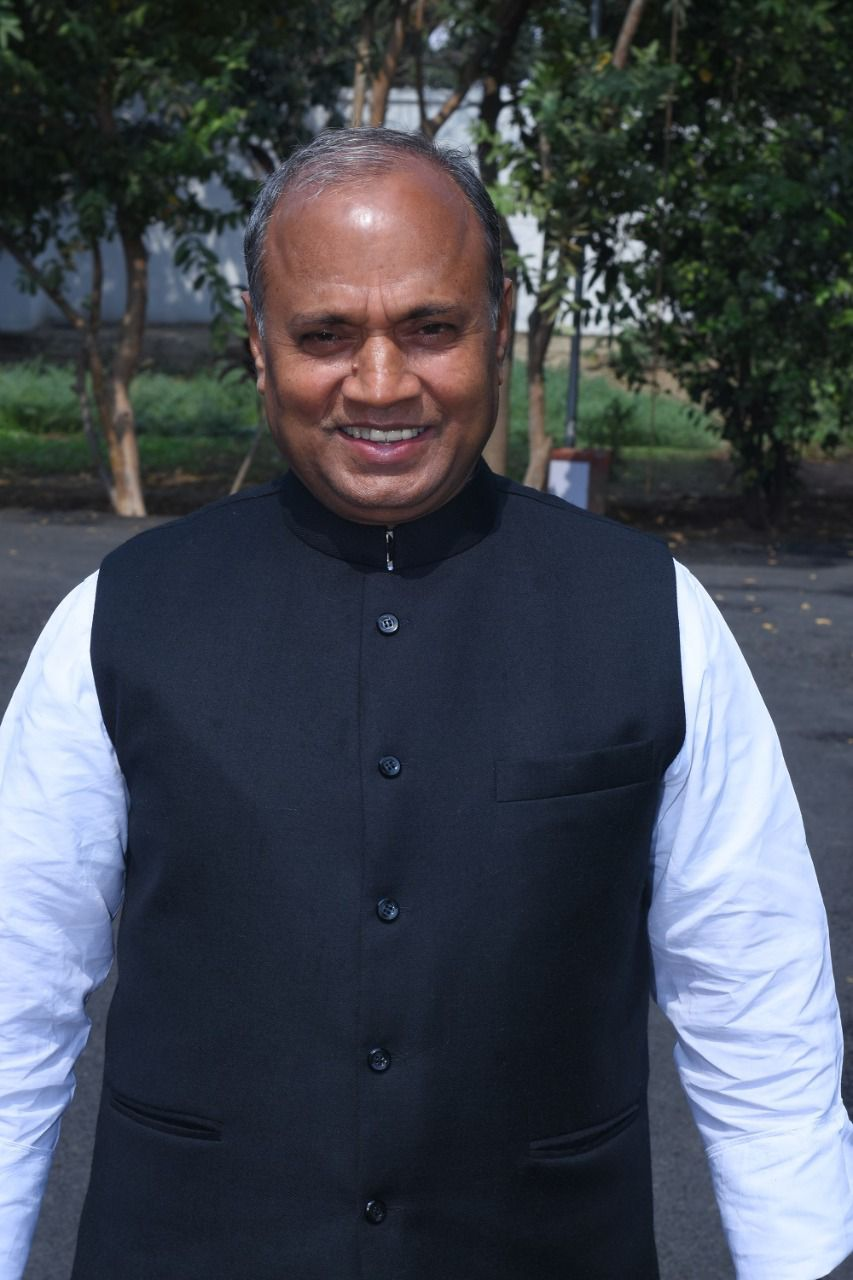

Union Minister of Steel
- In office 7 July 2021 – 6 July 2022
- Prime Minister: Narendra Modi
- Preceded by: Dharmendra Pradhan
- Succeeded by: Jyotiraditya Scindia

National President of Janata Dal (United)
- In office 27 December 2020 – 31 July 2021
- Preceded by: Nitish Kumar
- Succeeded by: Lalan Singh

Member of Parliament, Rajya Sabha
- In office 8 July 2010 – 4 July 2022
- Succeeded by: Khiru Mahto
- Constituency: Bihar

Personal details
- Born: 6 July 1958 (age 68) Mustaffapur, Nalanda, Bihar, India
- Party: Jan Suraaj Party (2025–present)
- Other political affiliations: Aap Sabki Aawaz (2024–2025); Bharatiya Janata Party (2023–2024); Janata Dal (United) (2010–2022)
- Spouse: Girija Singh (m. 1982)
- Children: 2, including Lipi Singh
- Education: Patna University; Jawaharlal Nehru University
- Website: rcpsingh.org
- Nickname: RCP Singh

Ram Chandra Prasad Singh (born 6 July 1958) is an Indian politician and former IAS officer who served as national president of Aap Sabki Aawaz and Janata Dal (United), before joining the Jan Suraaj Party. Singh is a former Member of Parliament, Rajya Sabha from Bihar from 2010 to 2022. He was a Uttar Pradesh cadre IAS officer before joining politics. He was also principal secretary of Nitish Kumar. He became Minister of Steel in Second Modi ministry when cabinet overhaul happened.

== Personal life ==
Singh was born in Mustaffapur in Nalanda district, Bihar to Sukhdeo Narayan Singh and Dukhalalo Devi. He married Girija Singh on 21 May 1982, with whom he has two daughters. His daughter, Lipi Singh, is a 2016-batch IPS officer and second daughter Lata is a Lawyer. He belongs to OBC category.

== Education ==
He completed his primary education in his village and passed Twelfth grade from Patna Science College. He graduated with a Bachelor of Arts (Honours) degree in history from Patna College in 1979 and did master's degree in International relations From School of International studies at Jawaharlal Nehru University, New Delhi in 1982.

== Career ==
He initially joined the IRS (income tax) and completed the training. He resigned from the IRS after getting selected in the IAS in the year 1984, he was allotted the Uttar Pradesh cadre. He worked in various roles typical to an IAS officer both in state government and on central deputation.

While working in central deputation he came in contact with Nitish Kumar and worked as his private secretary for 7 years. He worked as Principal Secretary to Nitish Kumar after he was elected chief minister of Bihar in 2005 Bihar Legislative Assembly election. He took voluntary retirement from the Service in 2010 and joined the Nitish Kumar led JD(U) to start his political career.

On 31 October 2024, Singh announced formation of his own political party called Aap Sabki Aawaz. It was formed on the occasion of Diwali and the birth anniversary of Sardar Vallabh Bhai Patel, who is recognised as an icon by the Kurmi community of Bihar. On this occasion, Singh also announced that he will contest in the 2025 Bihar Legislative Assembly election.

On 18 May 2025, Singh merged his party Aap Sabki Aawaz with Prashant Kishor's Jan Suraaj Party.

== Politics ==
- Got elected to Rajya Sabha in June 2010.
- Served as Member of Standing Committee on Railway, DOPT, Home.
- Served as Member of Consultative Committee on External Affairs and Home.
- Joined JDU in 2010. Given the assignment of General Secretary.
- Later elevated as General Secretary (Organisation) of JDU.
- Served as National President JDU from 27 December 2020 to 31 July 2021.
- Took oath as Union Cabinet Minister of Steel, Govt. of India on 7 July 2021.

Political offices
Preceded by Dharmendra Pradhan	Minister of Steel; 7 July 2021 - 6 July 2022	Succeeded by Jyotiraditya Scindia
