= Shivdeep Lande =

2006-batch IPS officer

IPS Shivdeep Lande
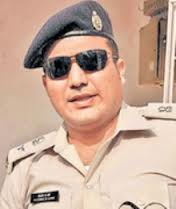
- Portrait of Shivdeep Lande
- Born: 29 August 1976 (age 49); Akola, Maharashtra, India
- Education: BE (Electrical) from Shri Sant Gajanan Maharaj College of Engineering, Shegaon
- Occupation: IPS Officer

Shivdeep Wamanrao Lande is a former IPS Officer of 2006 Batch.He Resigned From IPS On 19-09-2024 He served as Inspector General- Purnia (Purnia), Bihar. Earlier, he served as the Deputy Inspector General of Tirhut Division (Muzaffarpur) Kosi division and Superintendent of Police in Araria, Purnia and Munger districts of Bihar. His tenure as the SP of Patna (Central Region) was quite popular. He arrested many criminals and took action against offenders. Lande was popular as he took strict action against eve-teasers. Shivdeep Lande has been affectionately given many names such as 'Dabbang', 'Singham' and 'The Supercop' by the people.

As per media reports, he donates 60% to 70% of his salary to the sangathan which organizes mass marriages of poor girls and runs coaching classes and a hostel for students in Akola to "Aid Them Realize Their Dreams".

== Early life and family ==
Shivdeep Lande was born on 29 August 1976 in Akola district in the Vidarbha Area of Maharashtra. He was born in a Maharashtrian farmer's family. He married Mamta Shivtare on 2 February 2014, he has a daughter named Arhaa. Mamta Shivtare is the daughter of Vijay Shivtare the Former Minister of State For Water Resources And Water Conservation, and is also the Guardian Minister of Satara District in Maharashtra.

== Education and career ==
Lande received his early education from Saraswati Vidya Mandir High School in his hometown Akola, and his bachelor's degree in electrical engineering from Shri Sant Gajanan Maharaj College of Engineering, Shegaon in Maharashtra, India. Lande joined the Indian Police Services after completing his training at Sardar Vallabhbhai Patel National Police Academy in Hyderabad. Although he was first selected for Indian Revenue Services, later he joined the Indian Police Service in 2006.

== Political Career ==
He launched his party named Hind Sena on 08 April 2025 in Patna, Bihar. He also announced that his party will contest the 2025 Bihar legislative assembly election.

== See also ==
- Chandan Kushwaha
