= Berar-Deccan Marathi =

Marathi–Konkani language of India

- Native to: India
- Region: Deccan
- Native speakers: (13,000,000 cited 2000) (perhaps conflated with Deccani Urdu)
- Language family: Indo-European: Indo-Iranian; Indo-Aryan; Southern Zone; Marathi–Konkani; Marathi?; Berar-Deccan Marathi
- Dialects: Bijapuri; Kalvadi (Dharwar)

Language codes
- ISO 639-3: dcc
- Glottolog: decc1239

Berar-Deccan Marathi, is a possible language of the Marathi–Konkani group, or perhaps just a regional dialect of Marathi. Glottolog reports that it is closely related to Varhadi-Nagpuri. (Sub)dialects are Bijapuri (of Bijapur district, Karnataka) and Kalvadi (of Dharwad district). These have been counted among the Marathi dialects, and it is not clear just how distinct they are from standard Marathi, with the distinct Deccani language perhaps being Deccani Urdu.

Berar-Deccan Marathi shares the names of Deccani Urdu: Dakhini, Dakhni, Dakini, Dakkani, Dakkhani, etc. Ethnologue says the speakers are Muslim and that the language is written in the Nastaliq (primarily) and Devanagari scripts, but again this may be due to confusion with Deccani Urdu. According to the 16th edition of the Ethnologue publication, the article on Deccan with the code dcc states “May be the same as Dakhini dialect of Urdu" on page 372 of the physical publication.
