= Shahanoor Dam =

- Location within Maharashtra
- Official name: Shahanoor Dam D02907
- Location: Anjangaon Surji
- Coordinates: 21.2580714°N 77.3229682°E
- Opening date: 1990
- Owners: Government of Maharashtra, India

Dam and spillways
- Type of dam: Earthfill
- Impounds: Shahanoor river
- Height: 57.81 m (189.7 ft)
- Length: 828 m (2,717 ft)
- Dam volume: 3,446 km^{3} (827 cu mi)

Reservoir
- Total capacity: 46,040,000 m^{3} (1.626×10^{9} cu ft)
- Surface area: 2,970 km^{2} (1,150 sq mi)

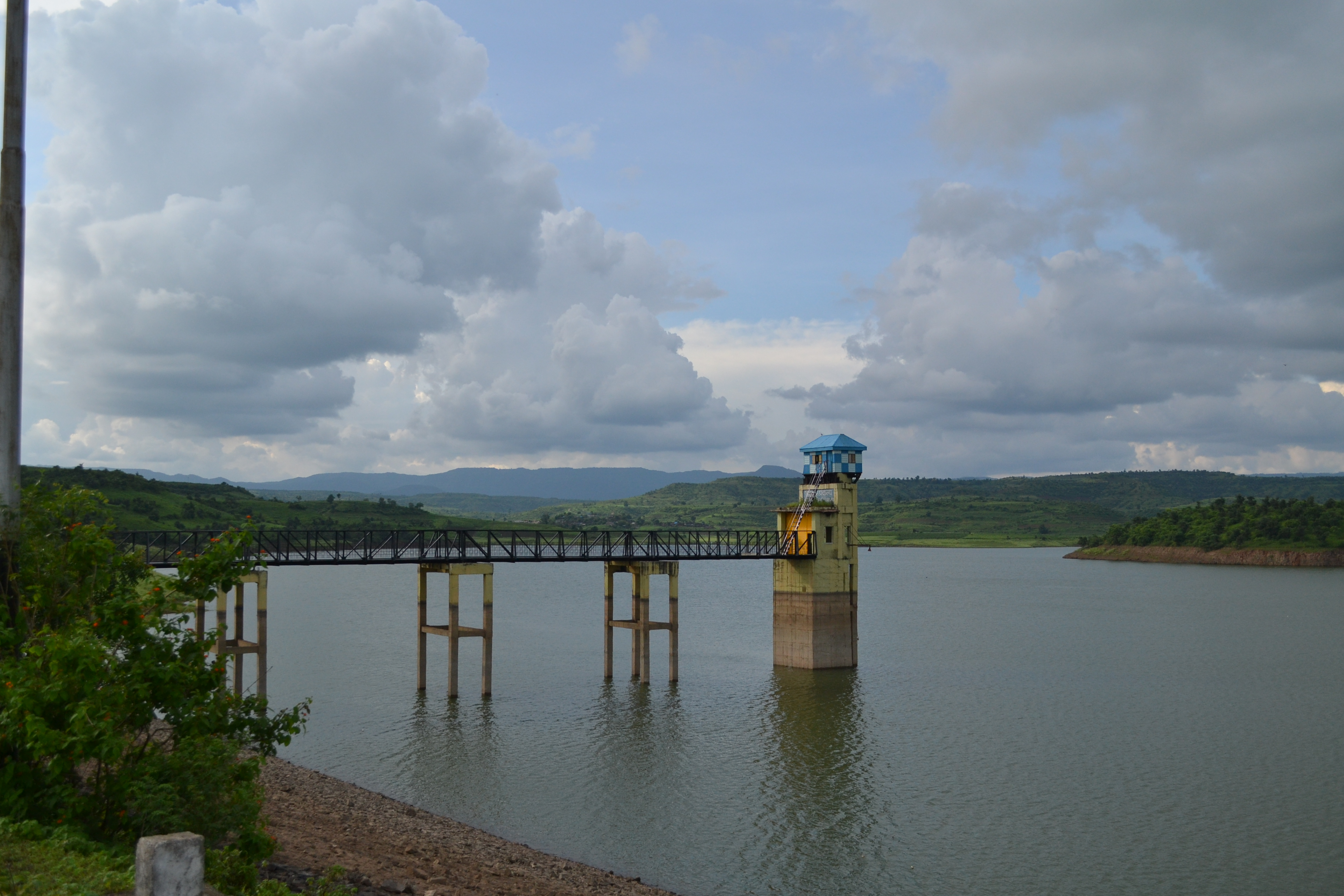
Shahanur Dam Image

Shahanoor Dam is an earthfill dam on Shahanoor river near Anjangaon Surji, Amravati district in the state of Maharashtra in India.

== Specifications ==
The height of the dam above lowest foundation is 57.81 m (189.7 ft) while the length is 828 m (2,717 ft). The volume content is 3,446 km^{3} (827 cu mi) and gross storage capacity is 47,850.00 km^{3} (11,479.83 cu mi).

== Purpose ==
- Irrigation
- Water Supply

== See also ==
- Dams in Maharashtra
- List of reservoirs and dams in India
