= Walgaon =

- Town
- Location in Maharashtra, India
- Coordinates: 20°59′56″N 77°42′23″E
- Country: India
- State: Maharashtra
- District: Amravati

Government
  - Type: Gram Panchayat

Population (2001)
  - Total: 16,659 (Approx.)

Languages
  - Official: Marathi
- Time zone: UTC+5:30 (IST)
- Postal code: 444801
- Vehicle registration: MH27

Walgaon is a town in Amravati district in the Indian state of Maharashtra. Samadhi of Gadge Maharaj is located near this town.

Its Coordinates are: Coordinates: 20°59'56"N 77°42'23"E . and is located on Maharashtra Major State Highway 6 and is located between Amravati and Paratwada city.

Before the delimitation of the constituency in 2008, Walgaon was constituency number 123 of Maharashtra Legislative Assembly between 1977-2004.
