= Hasnain Aaqib =

Indian poet, translator, and academic

Khan Hasnain Aaqib
- Born: Qadam Hasnain Khan; July 8, 1971 (age 55); Akola, Maharashtra, India
- Education: M.A. (Urdu, English, History), MSW (Master's in Social Work), M.Ed. and LLB
- Occupation: Lecturer
- Known for: Poet, writer, research scholar, literary critic, translator & reflective translator
- Notable work: Ram-e-Aahoo (collection of Urdu ghazals), Khama Sajda Rez, Iqbal Ba Chashm-e-Dil, Kam-O-Besh
- Spouse: Mahejabeen
- Children: 3
- Awards: AMP National Award for Excellence in Education, Mukhlis Musawwari Award for Literature

Khan Hasnain Aaqib is an Urdu, Hindi, and English poet who has 17 published books. He is primarily known for writing ghazals and nazm in Urdu, Hindi and Persian languages. He is a member of the Urdu and Persian language committee of Balbharti, Pune. His Persian poetry is largely acknowledged in Persian speaking regions as well.

He is credited with coining the term "prophiem", for the genre of poems denoting the praise and biographic account of the Islamic prophet Muhammad. He also coined the term "reflective translation" for the work of literary and academic translation into any other language which is not the mother tongue of the translator. He initiated the movement, insisting upon this term to be categorized and called reflective translation.

== Early life ==
Aaqib was born in Akola, and spent his childhood there. He is the eldest of eleven siblings; he has six sisters and four brothers. His mother died when he was seven years old, leaving behind her four children. His father, Mohammad Shahbaz Khan, married again, begetting another set of six children with his second wife.

Aaqib belonged to an economically moderate family. His grandfather, Mohammad Mirbaz Khan aka Baba Taj Mastan, was a mystic. His fathern brought him up in a very disciplined manner.

Aaqib graduated and earned his B.Ed. from Akola. During his schooling days, his family's economic condition had deteriorated. This forced him and his younger brother Ali Raza to start working at an early age. Both brothers began bear the burden of the younger siblings along with their father. During these days of hardship, Aaqib began to explore the various modes of expressing himself. He finally settled with writing poetry in English and Urdu.

== Career ==
Aaqib joined Taj K.G and English High School in Akola as a teacher immediately after completing his graduation. After his marriage, he moved to Pusad and joined G.N.Azad Jr. College of Education as a lecturer in 1999, where he is still working in the same capacity.
