= Shahanur River =

River in Maharashtra, India

Shahanur is the river in Western Vidarbha region of Maharashtra state in India. It is a tributary of Purna river. It flows through the Anjangaon Surji 444705 Amravati district and Akola district.

== River course ==
The river originates in the Satpuda ranges on the border of Amravati district of Maharashtra and Betul district of Madhya Pradesh. It then flows in the south direction for almost 100 km before emptying into Purna in Akola district.

== Shahanoor Dam ==
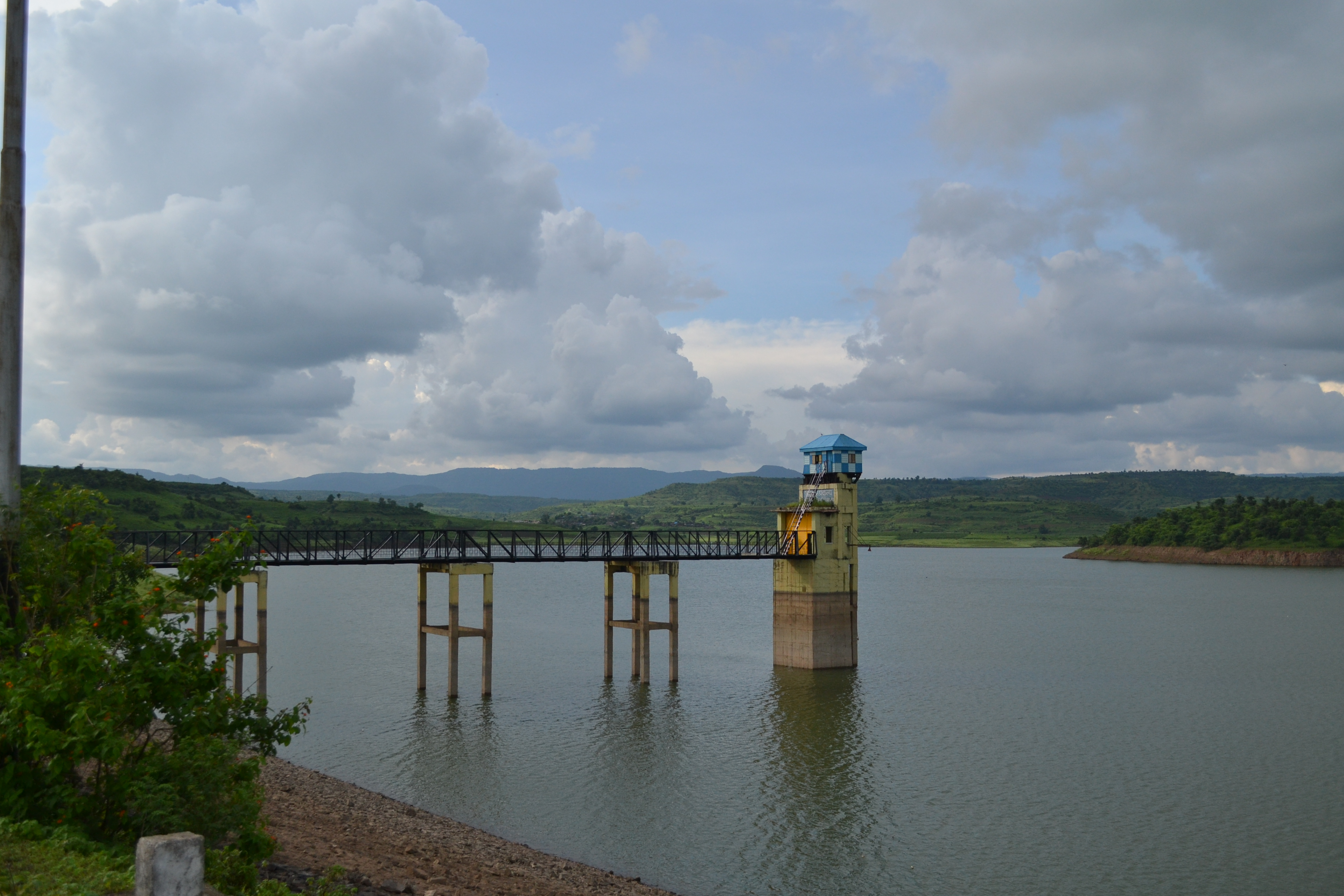
Shahanur Dam Image

There is a dam constructed on the river. The dam is situated 8 km from nearest town Anjangaon.
