= Aap Sabki Aawaz =

Aap Sabki Awaz
- Abbreviation: AASA
- President: Ramchandra Prasad Singh
- Founder: Ramchandra Prasad Singh
- Founded: 31 October 2024 (15 months ago)
- Dissolved: 18 May 2025 (8 months ago)
- Split from: Bharatiya Janata Party
- Merged into: Jan Suraaj Party
- ECI Status: Registered unrecognized party
- Seats in Rajya Sabha: 0 / 245
- Seats in Lok Sabha: 0 / 543
- Seats in Bihar Legislative Assembly: 0 / 243
- Seats in Bihar Legislative Council: 0 / 75

The Aap Sabki Awaz (abbr. AASA), was an Indian political party formally announced by former union minister of steel, Ramchandra Prasad Singh on 31 October 2024 in Bihar after resignation from Bharatiya Janata Party. It was formed on the occasion of Diwali and the birth anniversary of Sardar Vallabh Bhai Patel, who is recognized as an icon by the Kurmi community of Bihar. On this occasion, Singh also announced that he will contest in the 2025 Bihar Legislative Assembly election. Later the following year on 18 May 2025, the party was merged into Prashant Kishor led Jan Suraaj Party.

== History ==
AASA party was formed on 31 October 2024, citing the occasion of Diwali and the birth anniversary of Sardar Vallabh Bhai Patel, who is also recognized as an icon by the Kurmi community of Bihar. The party was founded by RCP Singh, the former national president and union minister of steel for India Government.
