= Sudharak Olwe =

Indian photographer

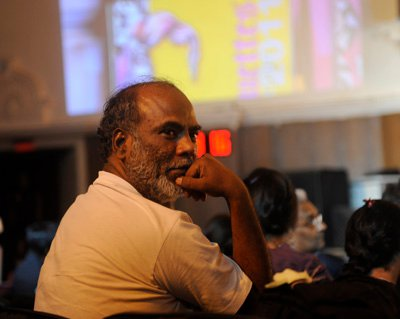
- Born: 19 March 1966 (age 60); Akola, Maharashtra, India
- Occupation: Photojournalist
- Known for: Photojournalism
- Awards: Padma Shri

Signature
- sudharakolwe.com

Sudharak Olwe (born 19 March 1966) is a Mumbai-based documentary photographer, whose work has been featured in national publications and exhibited in Mumbai, Delhi, Malmo (Sweden), Lisbon, Amsterdam, Los Angeles, Washington and Dhaka.

He is acclaimed in the Indian subcontinent for revealing the reality of life's tragicomic social theater. In 2005, he was one of the four awardees for the National Geographic's "All Roads Photography Program". He was awarded Padma Shri, one of India's highest civilian honors for his social work in 2016.

== Early Days ==
Mr. Suhdarak Olwe comes from Akola, a district in the state of Maharashtra. He has a Diploma in Photography from the Sir J. J. Institute of Applied Art (1986), Mumbai and also a Diploma in Film and Video Production (1992) from St. Xavier's College, Mumbai. But he credits his success to experience rather than educational qualifications. He ran away from his home in Mumbai to Hyderabad for some time which taught him about street life which he depicts in his Pictures. Sudharak Olwe heads the Photography promotion Trust, which aims to spread the knowledge of photography in young adults not only in urban areas but in the rural side too.
