= Shendgaon =

- Village
- Location in Maharashtra, India Shendgaon (India)
- Coordinates: 20.8966462°N 77.757454°E
- Country: India
- State: Maharashtra
- District: Amravati
- Elevation: 347 m (1,138 ft)

Languages
  - Official: Marathi
- Time zone: UTC+5:30 (IST)
- Telephone code: +91(07224)
- Vehicle registration: MH-27
- Website: www.anjangaon.com/index.php

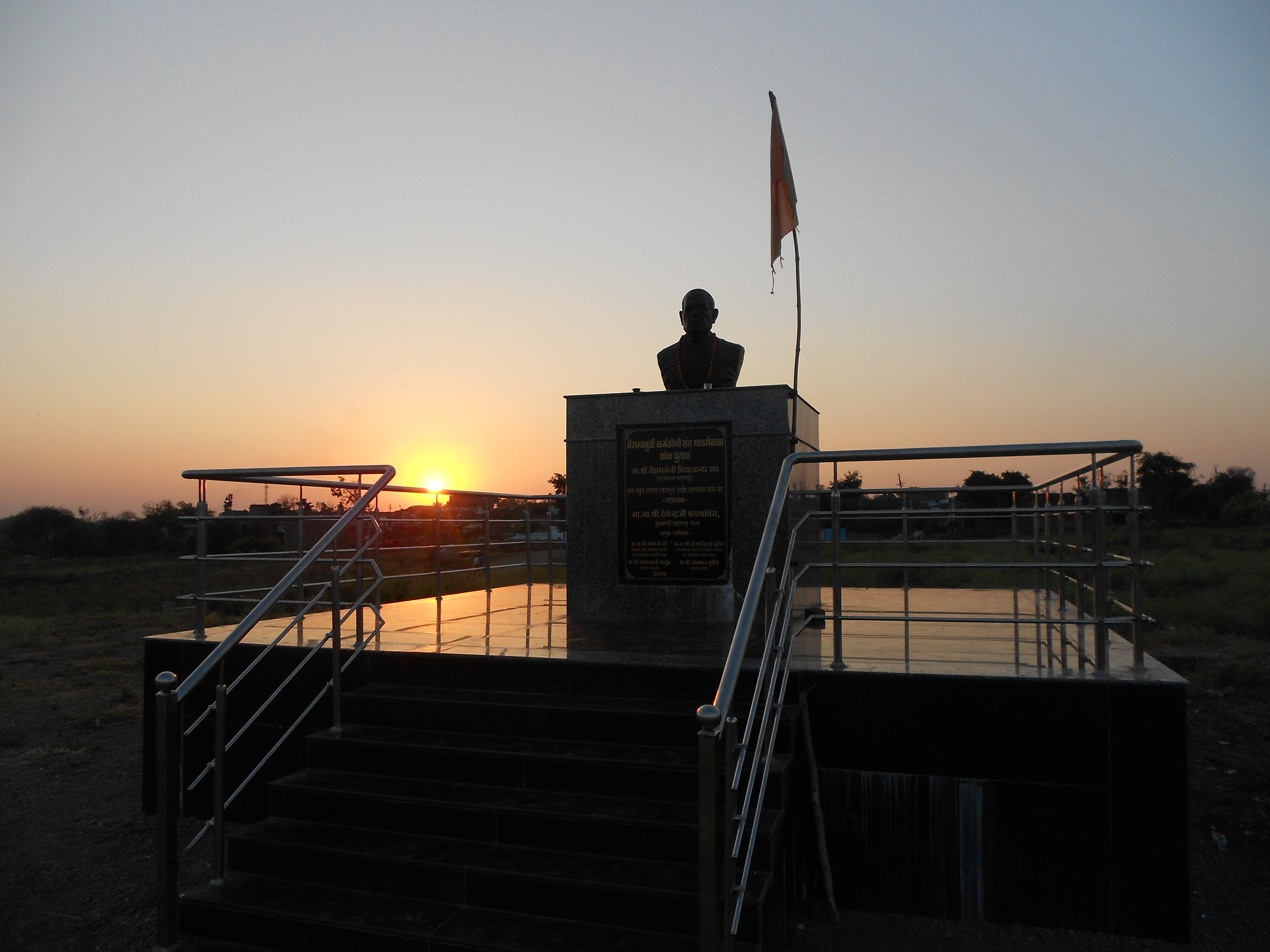
Statue of Sant Gadge Maharaj

The Indian village of Shendgaon is located in the taluka of Anjangaon which is in the district of Amravati in the state of Maharashtra. It is part of the Vidarbha region. Shendgaon is surrounded by Achalpur Taluka in the east, Daryapur Taluka in the south, Chikhaldara Taluka in the north, and Akot Taluka in the west. Marathi is the local language, but Hindi and English are commonly used. It is known as the birthplace of Saint Gadge Maharaj, a peripatetic teacher and social reformer, who recently had a commemorative bust unveiled in his honor. The state government of Maharashtra also runs a village cleanliness program named after him, and the University of Amravati was renamed as Sant Gadge Baba University.

== Places of interest ==
- Sant Gadge Maharaj Mandir
- Chikhaldara Wildlife Sanctuary- 30 km
- Melghat Tiger Reserve- 35 km
- Washim- 133 km
- Burhanpur- 140 km
- Sevagram- 158 km

== Notable people ==
- Gadge Maharaj
