= Chandan Kushwaha =

IPS officer (Bihar cadre)

- Police career
- Department: Indian Police Service
- Rank: Commandant Home Guards (Bihar) former Superintendent of Police, Banka former SP Rohtas former city SP Patna

Chandan Kumar Kushwaha is an IPS officer currently serving as Deputy Inspector General of Police for Tirhut range in Bihar. He has previously served as Superintendent of Police (SP) for Bihar's capital city Patna. Kushwaha was later transferred to Banka district as Superintendent of Police. Before being appointed as city SP of Patna, he was serving as SP for the Rohtas district. He was later shifted to Patna, replacing Shivdeep Lande as police superintendent. In 2018, he was raised to the post of Commandant of Home Guards, as a result of which he was recalled from Banka. As per reports, in his sixteen-month service as the head of the police force of Banka, he took stringent measures to reduce the level of crime in the district. He has also served as city SP for Gaya. Kushwaha was investigation incharge of several high profile cases like 2013 Bodhagaya serial blasts and 2016 Bihar Toppers Scam.

== Career ==
Kushwaha is a resident of Bhagalpur in Bihar. He was amongst the few officers to get his home cadre after completing his training of IPS. As city SP of Banka, Kushwaha took various measures to control crime; he prepared a list of some of the top criminals, who were wanted in many offences. A total of nine such convicts, who were guilty of offences like Bank robbery and other dreaded crimes were identified. Kushwaha submitted the list to incumbent District Magistrate with proposal of applying "Criminal Control Act" against those offenders. In 2017, while he was serving as SP of Patna, he took the charge of operation which was launched in order to save forty people from drowning in river Ganga. The victims were travelling on boats from Sabalpur Diara to Patna and the boat in which they were travelling contained more passengers than its capacity. As per a statement given to the media by Kushwaha, his team was successful in saving ten people in this incident. He also motivated his subordinate police officials to keep a tab on all the incidents which were happening around them, when he was serving as SP of Banka, in order to consistently vigil the situation for tackling of crime.

As SP of Banka, Kushwaha also took steps to keep the police department free from corruption. After airing of a sting operation conducted by a news channel, which revealed the connivance between some of the police officers and Sand Mafias of the region, he suspended some of the tainted officials and sent recommendation to higher authorities to release one of them from service.

In 2016, Kushwaha was successful in arresting forty-five students of Iqbal Hostel, Patna, who were involved in eve teasing of a girl at Kali Ghat near Darbhanga house in Patna. As per media reports, the students belonging to Iqbal hostel of Patna were eve-teasing a girl in front of her family, which was returning after worshipping goddess Kali near Kali Ghat. When two people who were present there, stopped them from doing so, they thrashed them and moved towards Patna Medical College Hospital (PMCH) while beating them. When some of the junior doctors of PMCH intervened to protect the victim, a mob of students from Iqbal hostel arrived there later and threw a bomb on hospital's staff zone. In this bombing incident, two hospital staff were injured. On being informed, Kushwaha arrived and conducted a search and seizure operation to arrest forty five convicts. The law and order was subsequently restored after deployment of police force in the disturbed area.

In 2015, Patna Police under him took action against Bihar state president of Samajwadi Party, Ramchandar Prasad Yadav for fraudulently grabbing money from a person in name of offering him ticket of the party for contesting in elections. In the same year, when Kushwaha was serving as Deputy Commissioner of Police, an arrest notice was also issued against Rashtriya Janata Dal Member of Legislative Assembly, Surendra Yadav in a case of extortion. Kushwaha also solved the "Banka Middleman case" in which a dealer of land, Sanjay Bhatt took bribe from a woman in Rajaun police station area of Banka, impersonating himself as one of the relative of SP Chandan Kushwaha. In this incident, the Sub Inspector of Rajaun police station was also involved implicitly. After the victims moved to him to lodge a complaint, Kushwaha took immediate action by ordering arrest of all the culprits as SP of Banka. Kushwaha was also officer in-charge of extortion case related to Bihar's minister Khurshid Alam. In this incident, minister was intimidated by unidentified goons and an extortion amount of ten lakh rupee was also demanded from him.

As Rohtas SP in 2014, Kushwaha led a team to conduct a raid near Badhaiahbagh, around 15 km south of Sasaram to unearth the illegal stone quarrying activities being conducted therein. The team seized detonators and other explosives and arrested some of the mafias involved in it. In 2017, Patna Police under him also conducted a raid near Mehndiganj, Patna with the help of Bihar State's Drug control authority to arrest the owners of a spurious drug factory, that was operating there for long. Kushwaha was also one of the member of Special Investigation Team, which was probing "Bihar's Topper Scam", in which the accused named Bachha Rai was found guilty of taking money for enhancement of marks in Higher Secondary level school examination of the state education board.

In 2015, Pappu Yadav, a former legislator from Purnia called a bandh (strike) over alleged beating and death of a student named Siku Raj by Border Security Force personnels and state police officials. The Jan Adhikar Party workers turned violent at many places and Yadav himself led a mob of over hundred people accompanied by former union minister Nagmani to surround Dak Bangla Square in Patna. In order to control the angry mob Kushwaha detained Yadav and Nagmani along with their supporters for twenty four hours until the situation became normal. He was also a part of "Operation Viswas", an operation of Patna Police launched to arrest habitual criminals in domain of various organised crime within twenty four hours.

=== Arrest of Anant Singh ===
In 2015, in connection with a criminal case, Janata Dal (United) Member of Legislative Assembly Anant Singh was arrested; during his arrest, he was giving interview to media outlets at the entrance of Secretariat in Patna. In the meantime, Kushwaha arrived as city SP and asked Singh to avoid talking to media. However, Singh continued to do so, in response to this, Kushwaha grabbed him forcefully and tried to drag him inside the Police Station. Singh also became adamant and both men started pushing and shoving each other in presence of Police force and media. After arrival of Senior Superintendent of Police Vikas Vaibhav, the situation was controlled. After arrest of Anant Singh, who was arrested for a kidnapping case, a team of Patna police led by ASP Vivekananda and Kushwaha also arrested Kartik Singh, one of the aide of Singh from Central Mall located in Frazer road, Patna. As per media reports, after arrest of MLA Anant Singh, his supporters and private bodyguards arrived at Police Station; while supporters started chanting slogans against Singh's arrest and against Patna police, the bodyguards confronted police and protested against arrest. Reportedly, Kushwaha gave them stringent warning and allowed Police to use lathis to disperse the supporters of Singh.

=== Bihar Liquor Prohibition ===
In 2017, after Government of Bihar brought prohibition law against consumption of alcohol, Kushwaha was engaged in stringent implementation of the dry law in his domain of Banka district. He took resort to speedy trial and swift action to solve the cases of liquor consumption expeditiously.

=== Anti Naxalite operation ===
In 2015, Rohtas police conducted an Anti Naxalite operation in Kaimur hills with the help of Central Reserve Police Force, when Kushwaha was Superintendent of Police for Rohtas. In this operation, four Naxalites, who belonged to "Ajay Rajbhar faction" were arrested. In a press statement, Kushwaha also revealed to the media that police has recovered 3.15 bore rifles, 13 single-barrel guns, a pistol, 80 cartridges of .315 bore and 12 bore, two sacks of gunpowder and 55 batteries used in making improvised explosive devices (IEDs) in this operation.

=== 2013 Bodhgaya serial blasts ===
Kushwaha was serving as city SP for Gaya, when in 2013, Bodhagaya serial blasts happened. Though no group assumed the responsibility of this terrorist incident, in which two monks were wounded and holy shrines of Budhhism, located in Bodhagaya were targeted by small explosive devices, investigation unveiled that the attack were a response to violence against Mulslims in neighbouring Myanmar by Budhhists. Subsequently, Kushwaha and District Development Officer Giridhar Dyal released the CCTV footage of the incident, in a bid to help National Investigation Agency study the case. Later, on the basis of footage, Police was successful in arresting Vinod Mistri, a person suspect of blasts. Five more suspects were arrested later from Patna in connection with the incident.

== See also ==
- Bijaya Kumar Maurya
- Lipi Singh
