= Gadge Maharaj =

Indian social reformer (1876–1956)

- Born: Debuji Zhingraji Janorkar; 23 February 1876; Shendgaon, Berar Province, British India (now in Maharashtra, India)
- Died: 20 December 1956 (aged 80); Walgaon, Maharashtra, India

Philosophical work
- Main interests: Religion, kirtans, ethics

Gadge Maharaj (23 February 1876 - 20 December 1956; also known as Sant Gadge Maharaj or Sant Gadge Baba) was an Indian mendicant-saint and social reformer from the Indian state of Maharashtra. He lived in voluntary poverty and wandered to different villages promoting social justice and initiating reforms, especially related to sanitation. He is still revered by the common people in India and remains a source of inspiration for various political parties and non-government organizations.

== Life and career ==
His original name was Debuji Zhingraji Janorkar. He was born in Shendgaon village in present-day Anjangaon Surji Taluka in Amravati District of Maharashtra to a Dhobi backward class farming family. (Note: quote on page-138: Gadge Maharaj or Gadge Baba (1876-1956) was born in a family of the Washerman caste in the district of Daryapur, not too far from the town of Rddhipur in which Gundam Raul lived seven centuries earlier.) As a public teacher, he often travelled with an inverted food pan on his head and his well-known broom beside him. When he entered a village, he would instantly start cleaning the gutters and roads of the village. He also told the citizens of the village that their congratulations would have to wait until his work was done. Villagers gave him money, which Maharaj used for society by building schools, dharmashalas, hospitals, and shelters for animals.

He exhorted people to stop animal sacrifice as part of religious rituals and campaigned against vices such as alcohol abuse.

He tried to embody the values that he preached: hard work, simple living and selfless service to the poor. He abandoned his family (a wife and three children) to pursue this path.

Maharaj met the spiritual teacher Meher Baba several times. Meher Baba indicated that Maharaj was one of his favourite saints and that Maharaj was on the sixth plane of consciousness. Maharaj invited Meher Baba to Pandharpur, India, and on 6 November 1954 thousands of people had Maharaj and Meher Baba's darshan.

== Relation with Ambedkar ==
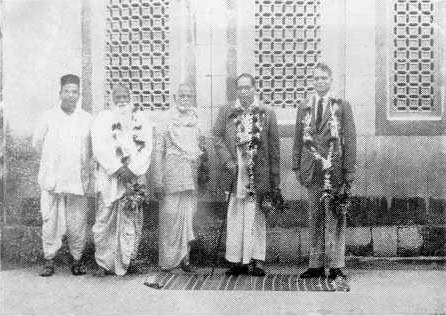
B. R. Ambedkar, Bhaurao Patil with Gadge Maharaj

Gadge Baba influenced Dr. Babasaheb Ambedkar. The reason for this was that the social reform work he was doing by preaching to the people through his "kirtan", Dr. Ambedkar was doing the same through politics. Gadge Baba was also impressed by Babasaheb's personality and work. Gaadge Baba had donated the building of his hostel at Pandharpur to the People's Education Society founded by Dr Ambedkar. He used to cite the example of Ambedkar while urging the people to get educated. "Look, how Dr. Babasaheb Ambedkar became such a learned man by dint of sheer hard work. Education is not the monopoly of any class or caste. The son of a poor man can also obtain many degrees." Gadge Baba had met Ambedkar many times. Ambedkar used to meet him frequently and discuss social reform. Dr. Babasaheb Ambedkar had described him as the greatest servant of the people after Jyotirao Phule.

== Death and legacy ==
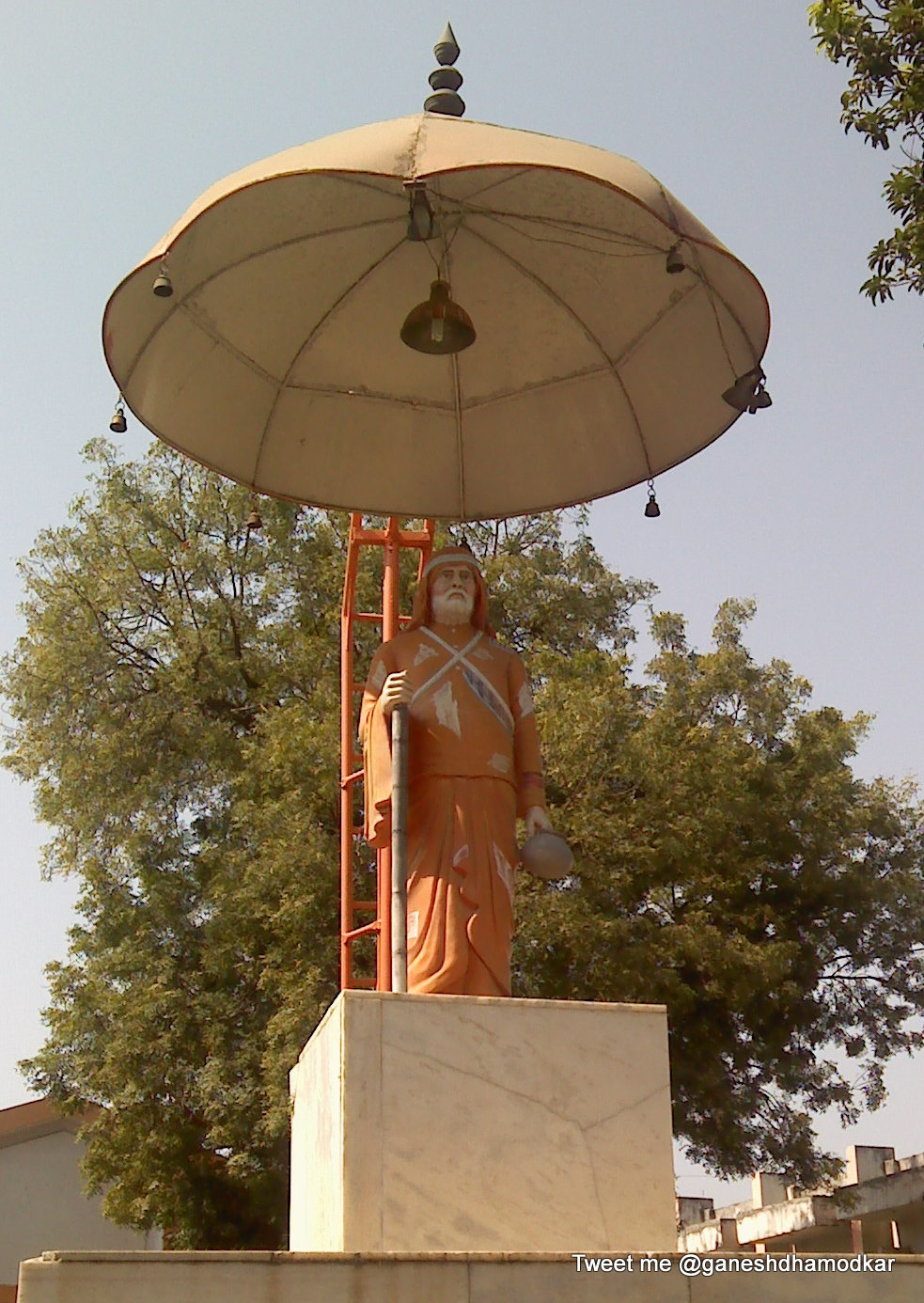
Gadge Baba Statue Nagpur

Maharaj died on 20 December 1956 on his way to Amravati, on the banks of river Pedhi near Walgaon. The Government of Maharashtra started the Sant Gadge baba Gram Swachata Abhiyan project in 2000–01 in his honour. This project rewards villagers for maintaining clean villages.

== Ten Commandments of Saint Gadge Baba ==
1. Provide Food to the Hungry.
2. Offer Water to the Thirsty.
3. Provide Clothes to the Naked.
4. Facilitate Education for Poor Children.
5. Offer Shelter to the Homeless.
6. Provide Medicine to the Blind, Handicapped, and Diseased.
7. Facilitate Employment for the Unemployed.
8. Offer Protection to Dumb Animals.
9. Facilitate the Marriage of Young Poor Boys and Girls.
10. Offer Courage to the Distressed and the Frustrated.

== Honors ==
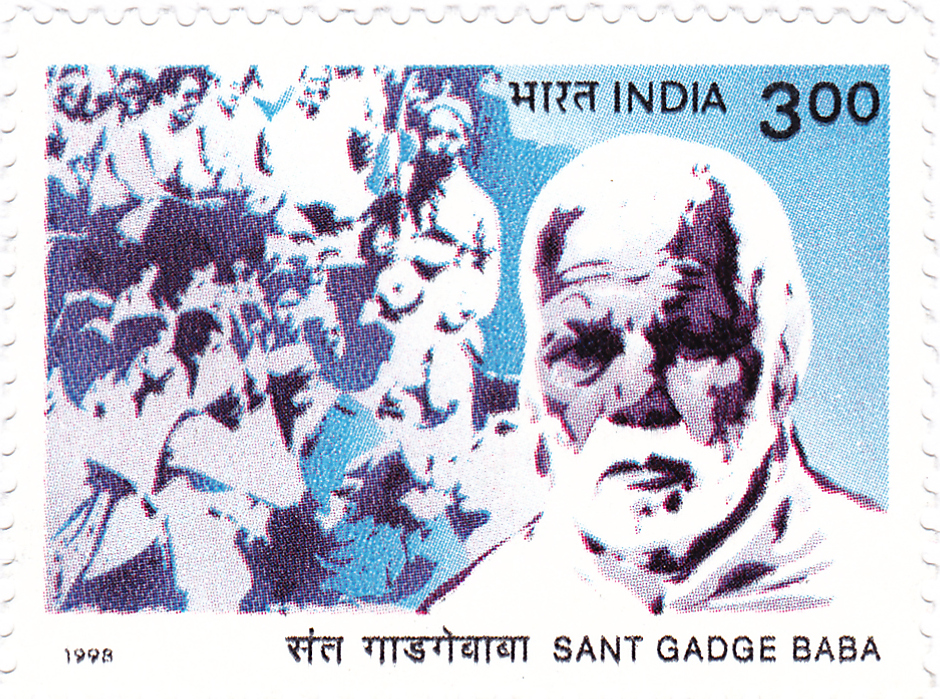
Gadge Maharaj on a 1998 stamp of India

The postal department of India had honored Gadge Maharaj by issuing a commemorative stamp in his name.
