= Rambalak Mahto =

Longest serving Advocate General of Bihar (died 2020)

Ram Balak Mahto
- Ram Balak Mahto

Former Advocate General of Bihar
- In office 1980–1984
- In office 1985–1989
- In office 1990–1993
- In office 2010–2015
- In office 2015–2020

Personal details
- Born: 27 January 1924 Bihar
- Children: Upendra Prasad; Surbila Prasad; Draupadi Sinha; Birendra Kumar – Ex MLA from Teghra; Nagendra Prasad; Meena Singh
- Occupation: Lawyer

Ram Balak Mahto was the longest serving advocate general of the state of Bihar. He was the chief legal advisor of Bihar's Chief Minister Nitish Kumar. Between 1937 and 2020, only 20 advocate generals were appointed to act as representative of state government in legal matters, and out of them, Mahto alone was appointed six times, becoming the longest-serving advocate general. He served both Nitish Kumar and Lalu Prasad Yadav led government, and was first appointed to the post in the year 1980.

== Life and career ==
Mahto served as advocate general during the tenure of six chief ministers of Bihar. He was appointed for the first time in the premiership of Bindeshwari Dubey in 1980. Later, he also served under Indian National Congress rule with Bhagwat Jha Azad and Satyendra Narayan Sinha as chief ministers. Mahto served as legal advisor of Lalu Prasad Yadav and secured the candidacy of one of his sons, Virendra Kumar, for Teghra Vidhan Sabha constituency from Rashtriya Janata Dal. Being successful in the elections of 2015, his son joined Janata Dal (United) in 2020. The interregnum in the career of Mahto came when Jitan Ram Manjhi replaced him with D.K Sinha as advocate general; however, Nitish reappointed him once again after taking charge as chief minister in 2017. He won many important cases for the Government of Bihar and played an important role in controversial cases like that of Mohammad Shahabuddin, the Rashtriya Janata Dal leader accused of the infamous acid attack case of Siwan.

He died in October 2020 at the age of 98. He was suffering from heart disease for a long time.
