= Akola Municipal Corporation =

Local civic body in Akola, Maharashtra, India

Type
- Type: Municipal Corporation of the Akola

Leadership
- Mayor: Sharda Khedkar, Bharatiya Janata Party
- Deputy Mayor: Amol Goge, Bharatiya Janata Party
- Municipal Commissioner & Administrator: DR.SHRI SUNIL LAHANE

Structure
- Seats: 80
- Political groups: Government (45): BJP (38); NCP-SP (3); SHS (1); NCP (1); AVS (1); IND (1); Opposition (35): INC (21); SS(UBT) (6); VBA (5); AIMIM (3)

Elections
- Last election: 15 January 2026
- Next election: 2031

Website
- http://amcakola.in/

The Akola Municipal Corporation is the governing body of the city of Akola, Maharashtra, India. The municipal corporation consists of democratically elected members, is headed by a mayor and administers the city's infrastructure, public services and police. Members from the state's leading various political parties hold elected offices in the corporation.

== Revenue sources ==
The following are the Income sources for the corporation from the Central and State Government.

=== Revenue from taxes ===
Following is the Tax related revenue for the corporation.

- Property tax.
- Profession tax.
- Entertainment tax.
- Grants from Central and State Government like Goods and Services Tax.
- Advertisement tax.

=== Revenue from non-tax sources ===
Following is the Non Tax related revenue for the corporation.

- Water usage charges.
- Fees from Documentation services.
- Rent received from municipal property.
- Funds from municipal bonds.

== Municipal elections ==
=== Political performance in Election 2026 ===
S.No.	Party name	Party flag or symbol	Number of Corporators
01	Bharatiya Janata Party (BJP)		38
02	Shiv Sena (SHS)		01
03	Nationalist Congress Party (NCP)		01
04	Indian National Congress (INC)		21
05	Shiv Sena (UBT) (SS(UBT))		06
06	Nationalist Congress Party – Sharadchandra Pawar (NCP-SP)		03
07	All India Majlis-e-Ittehadul Muslimeen (MIM)	kite	3
08	Others		07

=== Political performance in Election 2017 ===
The results of Election 2017 are shown in the following table.

S.No.	Party name	Party flag or symbol	Number of Elected members
01	Bharatiya Janata Party (BJP)		48
02	Indian National Congress (INC)		13
03	Shiv Sena (SS)		08
04	Nationalist Congress Party (NCP)		05
05	Bharipa Bahujan Mahasangh (BBM)		03
06	All India Majlis-e-Ittehadul Muslimeen (MIM)	kite	01
07	Independent		02

== List of Mayor ==
#	Name	Term			Election	Party
3	Madan Bhargad	9 March 2007	4 December 2009	2 years, 270 days	2007	Indian National Congress
4	Suresh Patil	4 December 2009	8 March 2012	2 years, 95 days	2007	Indian National Congress
5	Jyotsna Gawai	9 March 2012	10 September 2014	2 years, 185 days	2012	Bharipa Bahujan Mahasangh
6	Ujwala Deshmukh	10 September 2014	8 March 2017	2 years, 179 days	2012	Bharatiya Janata Party
7	Vijay Agrawal	9 March 2017	22 November 2019	2 years, 258 days	2017	Bharatiya Janata Party
8	Archana Masne	22 November 2019	8 March 2022	2 years, 106 days	2017	Bharatiya Janata Party
9	Sharda Khedkar	30 January 2026	Incumbent	180 days	2026	Bharatiya Janata Party

== Municipal limit extension ==
The municipal limit of Akola Municipal Corporation was finalized to be extended on 30 Aug 2016 taking into the Municipal area surrounding 24 suburbs and villages. This has raised the area to 128 km^{2} and population to 537,137. The Municipal region is thus subdivided into 20 wards with 4 members for each accounting 80 total seats.
