= Pramod Kumar Kushwaha =

Indian Police Service officer

Pramod Singh Kushwah DCP
- Occupation: Indian Police Service (IPS) Officer
- Awards: Special Operation medal by Union Home Ministry, India.

Pramod Singh Kushwah also known as Pramod Singh Kushwah is an Indian Police Service officer who gained public recognition primarily for his involvement in anti-terrorism operations.

== Career ==
Pramod Kushwah is a 1995 batch IPS officer of the DANIPS cadre. Kushwaha was the officer in-charge of Nirbhaya case; at that time, he was serving as Additional Deputy Commissioner of Police for Delhi. In the following years, Kushwaha served as Deputy Commissioner (DCP) of Delhi Police's special cell, a wing of Delhi Police established for counter terrorist operations.

In 2018 he received information regarding an Indian Mujahideen terrorist, Ariz Khan, who escaped from Batla House just before the 2008 encounter incident. As a response to this, he despatched a team to arrest Khan, who was en route to Uttar Pradesh to meet a sympathiser of Indian Mujahideen and was planning to revive the banned terrorist group. In 2020, Delhi Police under him arrested a couple, who were members of Islamic State Khorasan Province, a terrorist organisation. After interrogation, it was revealed that they were sent to incite violence in Anti-CAA protests. They also stated that they were involved in inciting Indian Muslims on social media platforms in order to motivate them for rebellion against Indian establishment.

In 2021, Kushwaha arrested a Pakistani national named Mohammad Ashraf from Laxmi Nagar area in Delhi. It was reported after preliminary investigation that the suspect was living in India, disguised as Indian citizen and he had some linkage with terrorists and the sleeper cells. It was revealed that, this arrest subverted some big terrorist operation, that was about to be conducted in India. Investigation also revealed that suspect was trained by ISI and was involved in several small scale terrorist activities in Jammu and Kashmir.

In 2022, he was transferred to Arunachal Pradesh by Rakesh Asthana, the Commissioner of Delhi Police.

In 2022, Kushwaha gained recognition after a team led by him was successful in decoding a terror module run by D-Company and ISI jointly, for which, he and his team was awarded with Union Home Ministry's "special operations" medal. In this multi city operation, a total of seven terror suspect were arrested by a team of nineteen police officer led by Kushwaha as DCP special cell. The search and seizure operation conducted by them also unearthed explosives and weapons.

In January 2023, Delhi Police Special Cell under Kushwaha arrested two terror suspects Jagjit Singh (29) and Naushad (56) – and recovered 22 cartridges along with 3 pistols. They were arrested from Uttarakhand and Jahangirpuri respectively and one of them had alleged links with Islamist terrorist group Harkat-ul-Ansar. Special Cell of Delhi Police also conducted inter-state operations under Kushwaha. In 2022, it was involved in arrest of three assailants, who were involved in assassination of a follower of Dera Sacha Sauda sect. It was reported that the assailants were working for Canada based gangster Goldy Brar, who was also an accused in murder of Punjabi singer Sidhu Moosewala.

== See also ==
- Sanjeev Kumar Yadav, Indian police officer who served in Delhi Police's Special Cell for years along with Kushwaha.
