= Varhadi dialect =

Dialect of the Marathi language

Varhadi
- Varhadi–Nagpuri
- वऱ्हाडी, 𑘪𑘨𑘿𑘮𑘰𑘚𑘲, vaṟhāḍī
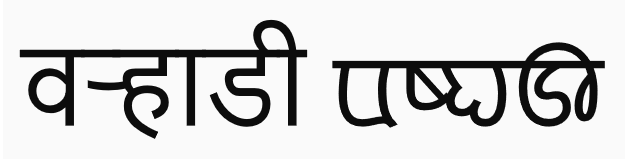
- Varhadi written in Devanagari & Modi script.
- Native to: India
- Region: Central India: Maharashtra (Vidarbha); Chhattisgarh (southwestern); Madhya Pradesh (southwestern); Telangana (in the districts of Akola, Amravati, Washim, Buldhana, Yavatmal and Some Rural Areas of Nagpur, Wardha District, Bhandara district, Gondia district, Chandrapur district)
- Native speakers: (7.0 million cited 1995)
- Language family: Indo-European: Indo-Iranian; Indo-Aryan; Southern Zone; Marathi; Varhadi
- Writing system: Devanagari script & Modi script.

Language codes
- ISO 639-3: vah
- Glottolog: varh1239

- Varhadi is classified as Vulnerable by the UNESCO Atlas of the World's Languages in Danger

Varhadi or Varhadi-Nagpuri is a dialect of Marathi spoken in the Vidarbha region of Maharashtra as well as by Marathis in adjoining parts of Madhya Pradesh, Chhattisgarh and Telangana in India.

== Vocabulary and grammar ==
Although all the dialects of Marathi are mutually intelligible to one another up to a great extent, each dialect can be distinctly identified by its unique characteristics. Likewise, Varhadi replaces the case endings lā (ला) and nā (ना) of standard Marathi with le (ले), a feature it shares with neighboring Khandeshi language. So, malā (मला) (to me) of standard Marathi becomes male (मले) while tyānnā (त्यांना) (to them) becomes tyāhile (त्याहिले) in Varhadi. The common examples of Hindi words in Varhadi which are different than standard Marathi are:

Varhadi	Hindi	Standard Marathi	English
Sīdhā / sarkā (सीधा/सरका)	Sīdhā (सीधा)	Saraḷ (सरळ)	Straight
Budā (बुडा)	Buddhā (बुढ्ढा)	Mhātārā (म्हातारा)	Old man
Pagalā / bhaitād (पगला/भैताड)	Pāgal (पागल)	Vedā (वेडा)	Stupid
Aṅgūr (अंगूर)	Aṅgūr (अंगूर)	Drākṣa (द्राक्ष)	Grapes

The grammatical changes in Varhadi differing from standard Marathi & closer to Hindi are:

Varhadi	Hindi	Standard Marathi	English
Mī jā'un rāhilō (मी जाउन राहिलो)	Maiṁ jā rahā hūṁ (मैं जा रहा हूं)	Mī zātōy (मी जातोय)	I am going
Mī ālī (मी आली)	Maiṁ āyī (मैं आयी)	Mī ālē (मी आले)	I (feminine) came
Tuyāvālā pēn dē (तुयावाला पेन दे)	Apnā pēn dō (अपना पेन दो)	Tujhā pēn dē (तुझा पेन दे)	Give your pen
Pānī ghēūn ghē (पानी घेऊन घे)	Pānī lē lō (पानी ले लो)	Pānī ghē (पाणी घे)	(Please) Have water.

Apart from this, there are many words & phrases indigenous to Varhadi i.e. common to neither standard Marathi nor Hindi. For instance, to give stress on a request or an order, the suffix zo (जो) (singular) or zā (जा) (plural) is used like "Māhyā porīchyā lagnāle ye zā (माह्या पोरीच्या लग्नाले येजा) "Please attend my daughter's wedding." Also, there are words & phrases maintained by Varhadi which were present in older Marathi (spoken 300 years ago or even prior to that) and have vanished from mainstream Marathi. E.g., in the vocative case, abe (अबे) is said in Varhadi instead of 'are' (अरे) of standard Marathi. Another good example is the sentence construction of past continuous tense e.g. in Varhadi, it is said 'Tho bahut abhyās kare' (थो बहूत अभ्यास करे) or 'To lay abhyās kare' (तो लय अभ्यास करे) (He studied a lot) unlike 'To khūp abhyās karāychā' (तो खूप अभ्यास करायचा) of standard Marathi.

In most of the Indo-Aryan languages (or even in Dravidian languages, for that matter), Sanskritized words of standard language get simplified in spoken dialects. Exceptionally, Varhadi has a few Sanskrit tatsama words for whom the standard Marathi counterparts are modified words (tadbhava shabda) such as in eastern parts of Vidarbha, snake is called sarpa (सर्प) unlike sāp (साप) of standard Marathi.

The forms of Varhadi vary in different parts of Vidarbha and also, as per castes. The similarity to Central Indo Aryan languages increases as one moves towards Madhya Pradesh. E.g. in the parts adjacent to Madhya Pradesh, zāna padte (जानं पडते) (I have to go) is preferred over zāve lāgte (जावे लागते), which is similar to Hindi jānā paṛtā hai (जाना पड़ता है). Also, consonant sound /t͡s/ like in ċūk (चूक), prevalent in Marathi but absent in Hindi, is often pronounced /t͡ʃ/ like in vacan (वचन). So, pāc/पाच ([paːt͡s]; five) may be pronounced as pānc/पांच of Hindi.

In the areas closer to Marathwada region of Maharashtra and on the contrary, distant to Madhya Pradesh, Varhadi is influenced by dialects of adjacent parts of Marathwada. One can easily recognize a person from Pusad, Digras or Umarkhed taluka of Yavatmal district by his sentence of present continuous tense. Somebody from this area will say mī mandirāt zāylo (मी मंदिरात जायलो) (I am going to visit a temple) instead of mī mandirāt zāun rāhilo (मी मंदिरात जाऊन राहिलो) of other parts of Vidarbha. Similarly, the tone of speech in Chikhli, Mehkar and Deulgaonraja talukas of Buldhana district is similar to that of nearby parts of Marathwada. If someone from this area speaks to a person from Nagpur or Wardha, the latter may get confused whether the former is from Vidarbha or Marathwada. Likewise, Khandeshi dialect spoken in parts of Jalgaon district adjacent to Vidarbha is too similar to be differentiated from Varhadi of Malkapur- Shegaon belt of Buldhana district.

== See also ==
- Nagpur
- Vidarbha
- Languages in Maharashtra
