= Bijaya Kumar Maurya =

Indian Police Services officer

- Education: Harvard University; IIT Delhi
- Occupation: Police officer

Bijaya Kumar Maurya is a retired IPS officer. He served as Director General of Uttar Pradesh Home Guards. He is a 1990 batch IPS officer, who has previously served as Additional Director General (logistics) in the Uttar Pradesh Police as well. Maurya was given additional charge of Director General (Home Guards) in August 2022, while he was serving as Director General logistics .

== Biography ==
Maurya is an alumnus of Harvard University. He is the first police officer from Uttar Pradesh, who has completed Masters in Policy Management from Harvard University of United States. While serving as Additional Director General for the Railways, he was awarded by Federation of Indian Chambers of Commerce and Industry. Maurya has also worked with United Nations for a peace meeting program. Later, he was deployed to work with Indo-Tibetan Border Police in the capacity of Inspector General. During his tenure in ITBP, he served primarily in North West Frontier Province of India, at Jammu and Kashmir and Ladakh.
