= History of Bihar =

History of Indian state of Bihar

Part of a series on the
History of Bihar
Ancient History
Prehistoric and Vedic Era

- Chirand (Neolithic) - Vedic period - Videha - Mithila (ancient) - Anga - Kikata

Urbanisation and Shramana

- Second Urbanisation - Rise of Shramana - Buddhism • Jainism • Ajivika

Gaṇasaṅghas

- Magadha - Vajjika League

  - Nāya
  - Vajji (tribe)
  - Licchavis of Vaishali

- Malla (tribe) - Kashi - Bulis

Imperial Magadha

- Brihadratha dynasty - Haryanka dynasty

  - Bimbisara
  - Ajatashatru

- Shishunaga dynasty - Nanda Empire

  - Mahapadma Nanda

- Maurya Empire

  - Chandragupta Maurya
  - Ashoka
Post-Mauryan and Smriti

- Shunga Empire

  - Pushyamitra Shunga

- Kanva dynasty - Development of Smriti - Brahmanical Revival

The Interregnum

- Kushan Influence - Mitra Dynasty - Resurgence of Licchavis

Classical and medieval
The Classical Age

- Gupta Empire

Early Medieval

- Later Gupta dynasty - Maukharis

Pala Era and Feudatories

- Pala Empire - Khayaravala dynasty - Pithipatis of Magadha

Medieval Mithila

- Karnats of Mithila - Oiniwar dynasty

Islamic Incursions

- Delhi Sultanate

Centers of Learning

- Nalanda - Vikramashila - Odantapuri - Telhara monastery

Early-modern
Afghan and Mughal Rule

- Sur Empire

  - Sher Shah Suri

- Mughal Empire

  - Bihar Subah
Regional Chieftaincies

- Chakwars - Chero dynasty - Gidhaur chieftaincy - Kharagpur Raj - Khokhra chieftaincy

Major Zamindari Estates

- Bettiah Raj - Khandavala dynasty - Dumraon Raj - Hathwa Raj - Jagdishpur estate

Colonial & Independence Era
Colonial Rule (1764–1947)

- Battle of Buxar (1764) - East India Company - Permanent Settlement (1793) - Santhal rebellion - Indian Rebellion of 1857

  - Kunwar Singh

- Bihar famine of 1873–74 - Bihar Province (Est. 1912) - 1934 Nepal–Bihar earthquake

Freedom Struggle

- Champaran Satyagraha (1917) - Salt Satyagraha - Bihar Vidyapeeth - Kisan Sabha

  - Swami Sahajanand Saraswati

- Quit India Movement

  - Azad Dasta
Modern Era (Post-1947)
Congress Era (1947–1967)

- Sri Krishna Sinha - Anugrah Narayan Sinha - Zamindari Abolition

Socialist and JP Era (1967–1989)

- Karpoori Thakur - Bihar Movement (1974) - Jayaprakash Narayan - Bhagalpur riots (1989)

RJD Era (1990–2005)

- Lalu Prasad Yadav - Rabri Devi - Fodder Scam

State Division (2000)

- Bihar Reorganisation Act, 2000 - Creation of Jharkhand

NDA Era (2005–Present)

- Nitish Kumar - Politics of Bihar

Culture, art, and society
Art and architecture

- Mahabodhi Temple - Nalanda - Barabar Caves - Tomb of Sher Shah Suri - Rohtas Fort - Golghar - Mithila Painting - Patna Qalam - Manjusha Art - Didarganj Yakshi

Society and language

- Bihari culture - Mithila • Magadh • Anga - Bihari languages

  - Maithili • Magahi
  - Bhojpuri • Angika
Religion

- Religion in Bihar - Buddhism in Bihar - Jainism in Bihar - Islam in Bihar - Sikhism in Bihar

Portal India Portal Bihar

Empires of Bihar

Mahajanapada Period
Magadha among the 16 great ancient kingdoms.

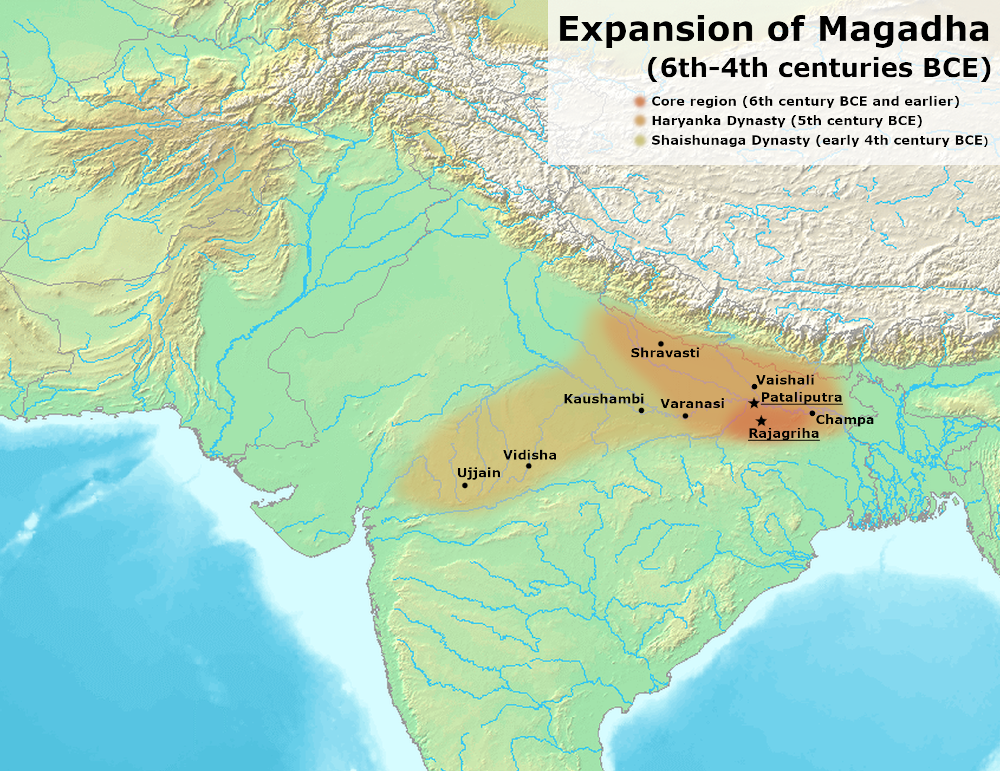

Haryanka Dynasty
Early territorial expansion under Bimbisara and Ajatashatru.

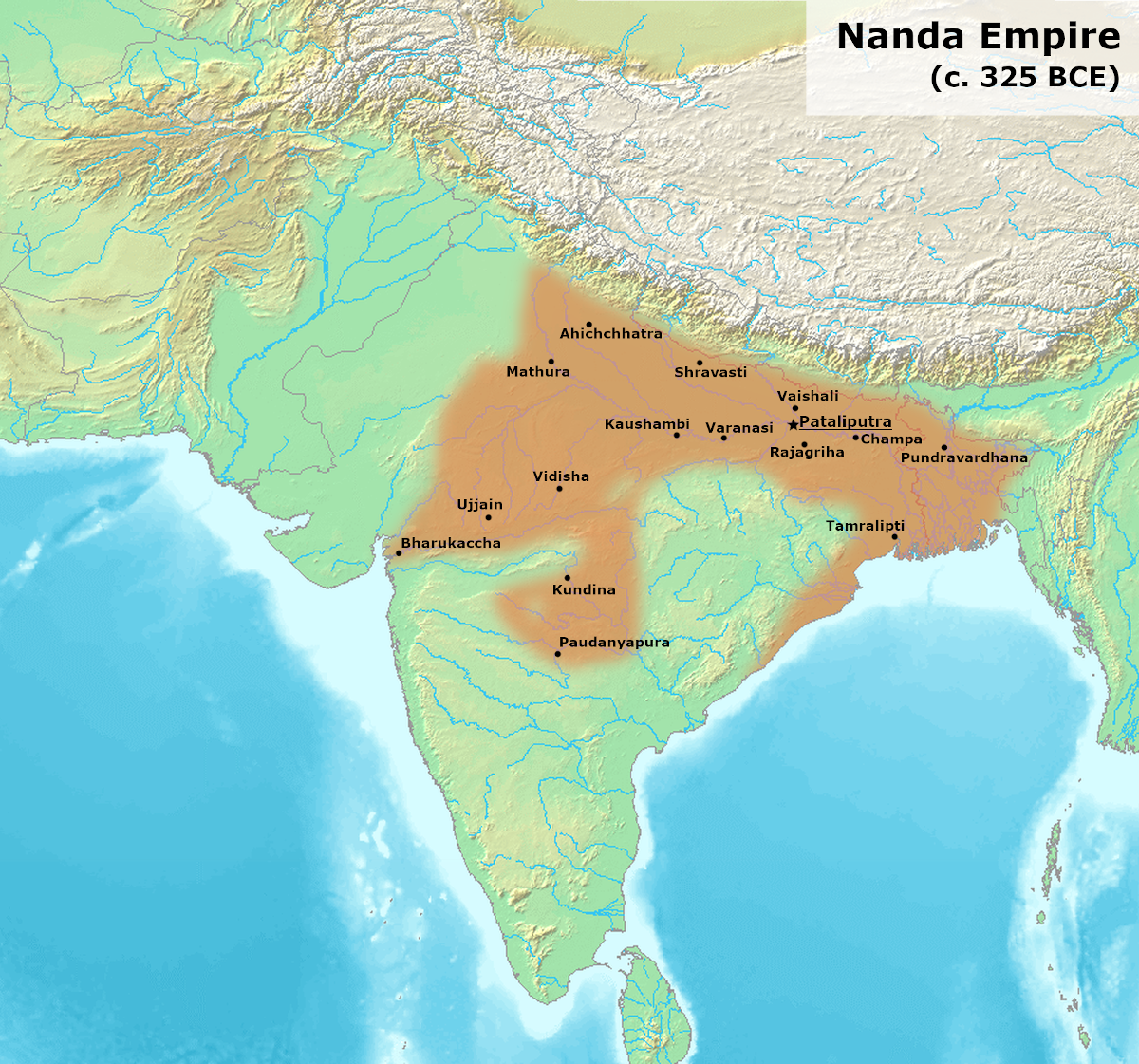

Nanda Empire
Magadha's dominance over Northern India.

Maurya Empire
Pan-Indian expansion originating from Pataliputra.

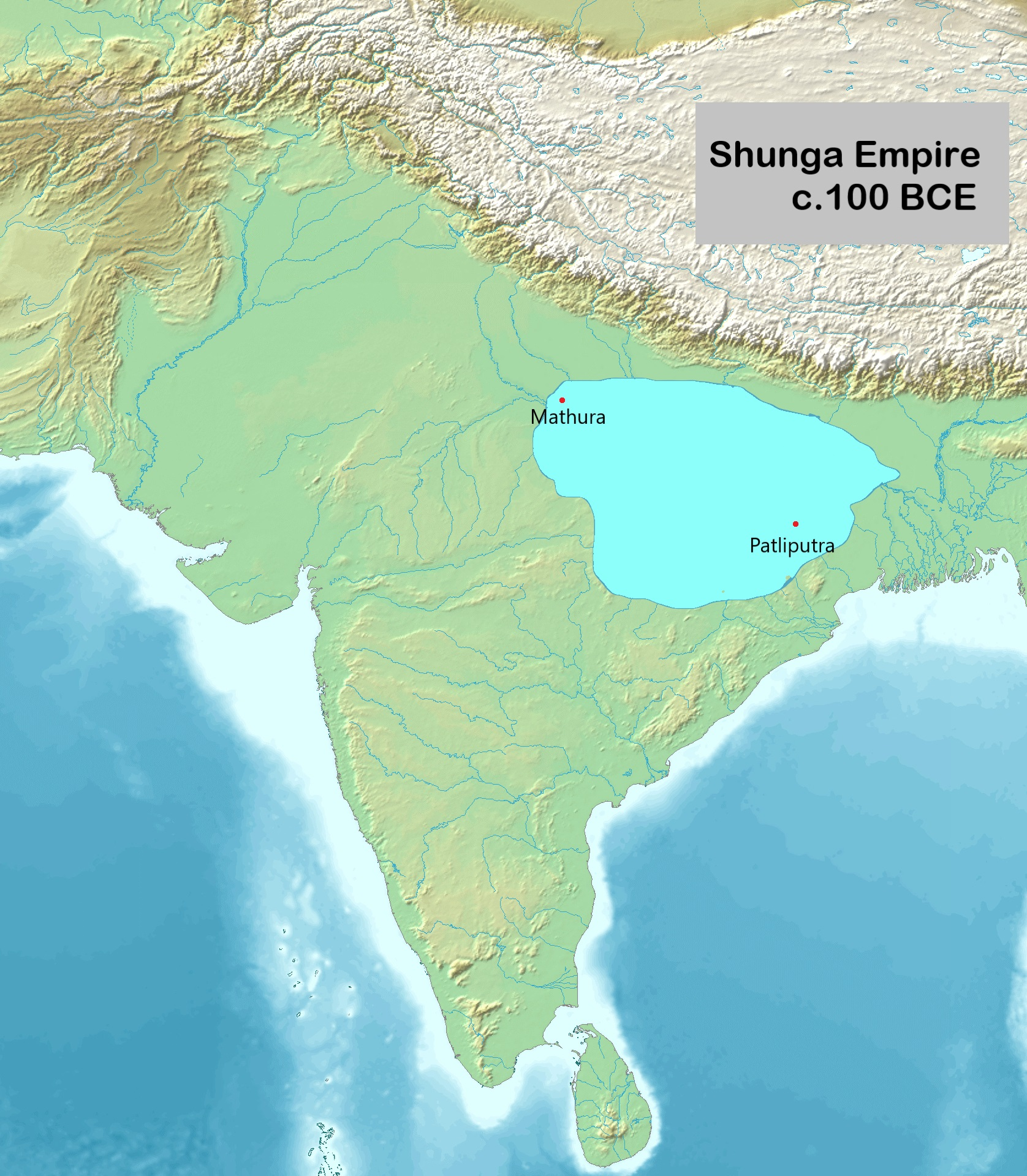

Shunga Empire
Post-Mauryan dynasty controlling central and eastern India.

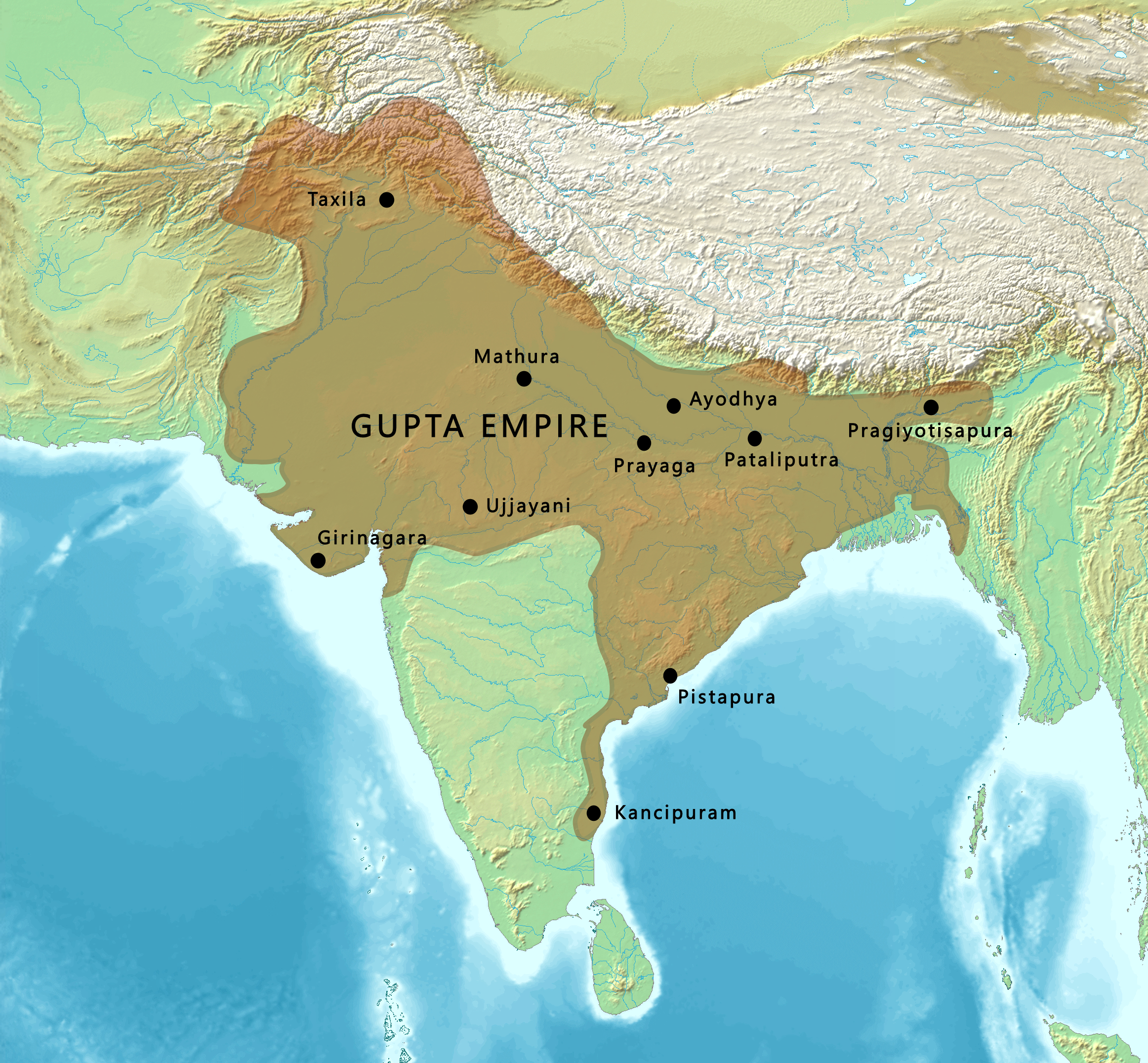

Gupta Empire
The Classical Age centered in Magadha.

The history of Bihar is one of the most varied in India. Bihar consists of three distinct regions, each has its own distinct history and culture. They are Anga, Magadha, Mithila, and Bhojpur. Chirand, on the northern bank of the Ganga River, in Saran district, has an archaeological record dating from the Neolithic age (c. 2500 – 1345 BC). Regions of Bihar—such as Magadha,Videha(Mithila) and Anga—are mentioned in religious texts and epics of ancient India. Mithila first gained prominence as a capital after the establishment of the ancient Videha Kingdom. The kings of the Videha were called Janakas. A daughter of one of the Janaks of Mithila, Sita, is mentioned as consort of Lord Rama in the Hindu epic Ramayana. The kingdom later became incorporated into the Vajjika League which had its capital in the city of Vaishali, which is also in modern day Mithila region.

Magadha was the centre of Indian power, learning and culture for about a thousand years. One of India's greatest empires, the Maurya Empire, as well as two major pacifist religions, Buddhism and Jainism, arose from the region that is now Bihar. Empires of the Magadha region, most notably the Maurya unified large parts of the Indian subcontinent under their rule. Their capital Pataliputra, adjacent to modern-day Patna, was an important political, military and economic centre of Indian civilisation during the ancient and classical periods of Indian history. Many ancient Indian texts, aside from religious epics, were written in ancient Bihar. The play Abhijñānaśākuntala being the most prominent.

The present-day region of Bihar overlaps with several pre-Mauryan kingdoms and republics, including Magadha, Anga and the Vajjika League of Mithila. The latter was one of the world's earliest known republics and had existed in the region since before the birth of Mahavira (c. 599 BC).

The Pala Empire also made their capital at Pataliputra once during Devapala's rule. After the Pala period, Bihar came under the control of various kingdoms. The Karnat dynasty came into power in the Mithila region in the 11th century and they were succeeded by the Oiniwar dynasty in the 14th century. Aside from Mithila, there were other small kingdoms in medieval Bihar. The area around Bodh Gaya and much of Magadha came under the Buddhist Pithipatis of Magadha. The Khayaravala dynasty were present in the southwestern portions of the state until the 13th century. For much of the 13th and 14th centuries, parts of Western Bihar were under the control of the Jaunpur Sultanate. These kingdoms were eventually supplanted by the Delhi Sultanate who in turn were replaced by the Sur Empire. After the fall of the Suri dynasty in 1556, Bihar came under the Mughal Empire and later was the staging post for the British colonial Bengal Presidency from the 1750s and up to the war of 1857–58. On 22 March 1912, Bihar was carved out as a separate province in the British Indian Empire. Since 1947 independence, Bihar has been an original state of the Indian Union.

== Neolithic (10,800–3300 BC) ==
The earliest proof of human activity in Bihar is Mesolithic habitational remains at Munger.

Prehistoric rock paintings have been discovered in the hills of Kaimur, Nawada and Jamui. It was the first time that a Neolithic settlement was discovered in the thick of the alluvium, over the bank of the Ganges at Chirand. The rock paintings depict a prehistoric lifestyle and natural environment. They depict the Sun, the Moon, stars, animals, plants, trees, and rivers, and it is speculated that they represent love for nature. The paintings also highlight the daily life of the early humans in Bihar, including activities like hunting, running, dancing and walking. The rock paintings in Bihar are not only identical to those in central and southern India but are also akin to those in Europe and Africa. The rock paintings of Spain's Alta Mira and France's Lascaux are almost identical to those found in Bihar.

== Bronze Age (3300–1300 BC) ==
=== Parallel to Indus Valley Civilisation ===
In 2017 bricks dated to the mature Harappan period was discovered from the outskirts of the ancient city of Vaishali. Any in-depth research which may establish definite links between Indus Valley Civilisation and Bihar is yet to be conducted. A round seal excavated from Vaishali dated 200 BC-200 AD has three engraved letters which according to Indus Valley Civilisation scholar Iravatham Mahadevan represents formulas inscribed on the Indus seals and dates it to the earliest layers of excavation i-e 1100 BC.

=== Rigvedic period ===
Kikata was an ancient kingdom in what is now India, mentioned in the Vedas. Some scholars have believed that they were the forefathers of Magadhas because Kikata is used as a synonym for Magadha in the later texts. It probably lay to the south of Magadha Kingdom in a hilly landscape. A section in the Rigveda (RV 3.53.14) refers to the Kīkaṭa 's (Sanskrit:कीकट), a tribe which most scholars have placed in present-day southwestern Bihar (Magadha) such as Weber and Zimmer while some scholars such as Oldenburg and Hillebrandt dispute that. According to Puranic literature Kikata is placed near Gaya. It is described as extending from Caran-adri to Gridharakuta (vulture peak), Rajgir. Some scholar such as A. N. Chandra places Kikata in a hilly part of the Indus Valley based on the argument that countries between Magadh and the Indus Valley are not mentioned such as Kuru, Kosala etc. Kikatas were said to be Anarya or non-vedic people who didn't practice Vedic rituals like soma, According to Sayana, Kikatas didn't perform worship, were infidels and nastikas. The leader of Kikatas has been called Pramaganda, a usurer. It is unclear whether Kikatas were already present in Magadh during the Rigvedic period or they migrated there later. Like Rigveda attributes of Kikatas, Atharvaveda also speaks about southeastern tribes like Magadhas and Angas as hostile tribe who lived on the borders of Brahmanical India. Bhagvata Purana mentions about the birth of Buddha among Kikatas.

Some scholars have placed the Kīkaṭa kingdom, mentioned in the Rigveda, in Bihar (Magadha) because Kikata is used as a synonym for Magadha in the later texts; however, according to Michael Witzel, Kīkaṭa was situated south of Kurukshetra in eastern Rajasthan or western Madhya Pradesh. The placement in Bihar is also challenged by historical geographers Mithila Sharan Pandey (who argues they must have been near Western Uttar Pradesh), and O.P. Bharadwaj (who places them near the Sarasvati River), and historian Ram Sharan Sharma, who believes they were probably in Haryana.

==== Northern black polished ware ====
Urbanization in the Gangetic plains began with the appearance of Northern black polished ware period and archaeologists trace the origin of this pottery in Magadh region of Bihar. The oldest dated site of NBWP is in Juafardih, Nalanda, which is carbon dated to 1200 BC.

== Iron Age (1500–200 BC) ==
=== Mahajanapadas ===
The Mahajanapadas era

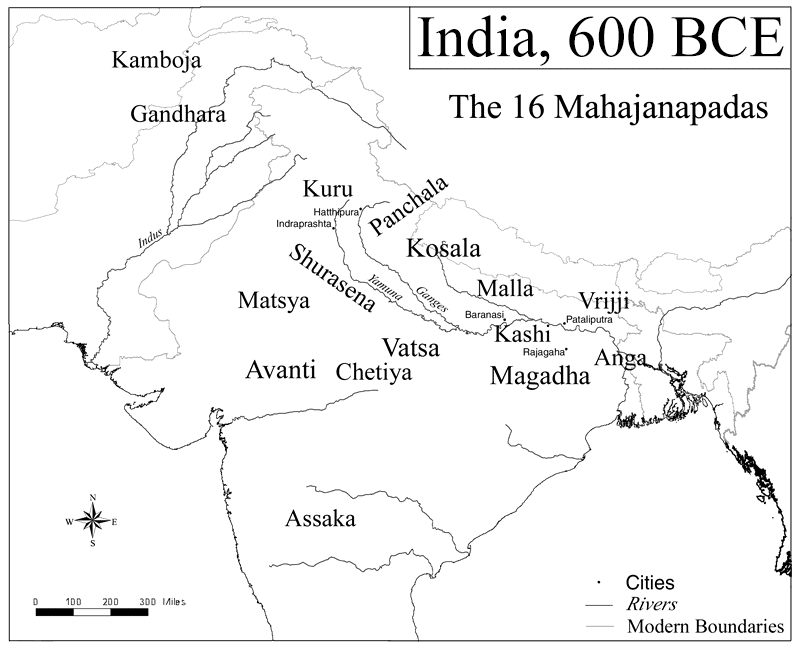
Anga, Vajji and Magadha on map of the Mahajanapadas.

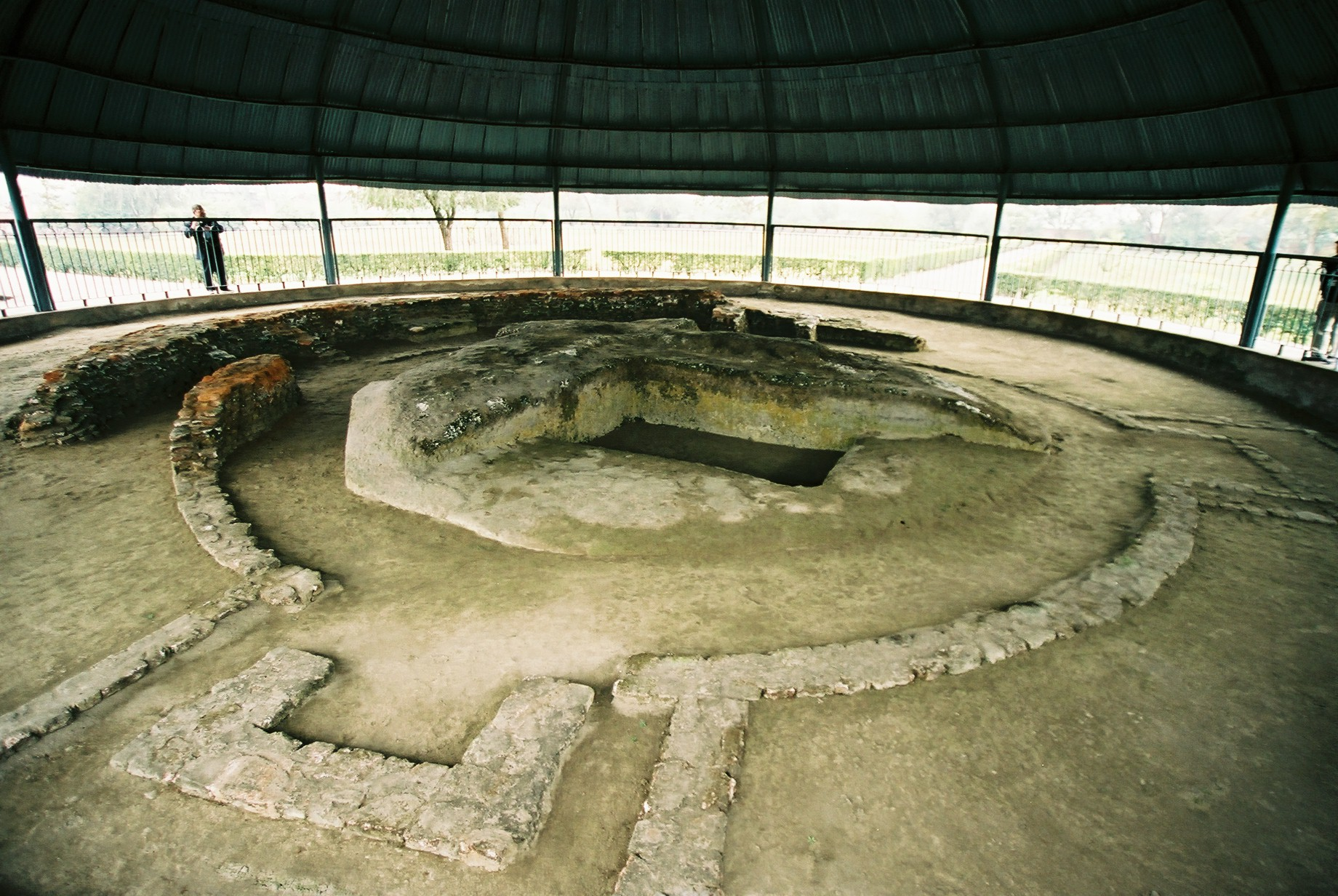
5th century BCE stupa built by the Licchavis of Vaishali to house the relics of the Buddha after his death

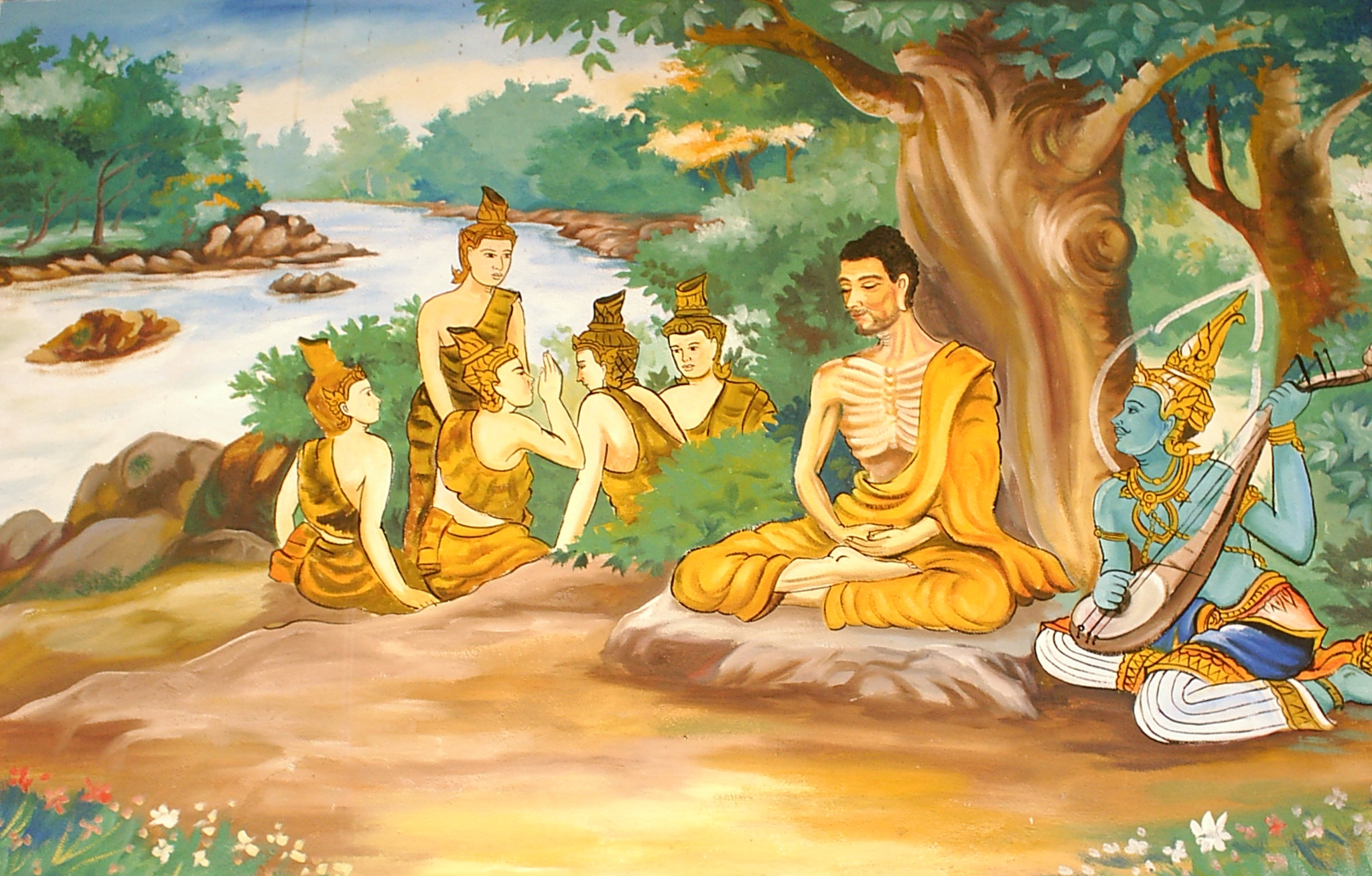
Gautama Buddha undertaking ascetic practices before his enlightenment under the Bodhi Tree, on the bank of Phalgu, Bodh Gaya.

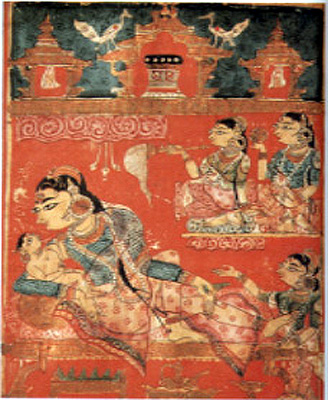
Detail of a leaf with, The Birth of Mahavira (the 24th Jain Tirthankara), from the Kalpa Sutra, c. 1375–1400.

In the later Vedic Age, a number of small kingdoms or city-states, dominated what is now Bihar. Many of these states have been mentioned in Buddhist and Jaina literature as far back as 1000 BC. By 500 BC, sixteen monarchies and 'republics' known as the Mahajanapadas – Kasi, Kosala, Anga, Magadha, Vajji (or Vriji), Malla, Chedi, Vatsa (or Vamsa), Kuru, Panchala, Matsya (or Maccha), Surasena, Assaka, Avanti, Gandhara and Kamboja – stretched across the Indo-Gangetic plains from modern-day Afghanistan to Bengal and Maharashtra.

The Vajji covered the modern North Bihar, Magadha covered South-western Bihar while Anga covered South-eastern Bihar. Many of the sixteen kingdoms had coalesced to four major ones by 500/400 BC, that is by the time of Siddhartha Gautama. These four were Vatsa, Avanti, Kosala and Magadha. In 537 BC, Siddhartha Gautama attained the state of enlightenment in Bodh Gaya, Bihar. Many of the Buddha's chief disciples and contemporaries had their origins in modern-day Bihar including Śāriputra, Maudgalyayana and Mahākāśyapa.

Around the same time, Mahavira was born to the Nāya tribe in modern-day Bihar near Vaishali. He was the 24th Jain Tirthankara, propagated a similar theology, that was to later become Jainism. However, Jain orthodoxy believes it predates all known time. The Vedas are believed to have documented a few Jain Tirthankaras and an ascetic order similar to the sramana movement. The Buddha's teachings and Jainism had doctrines inclined toward asceticism and were preached in Prakrit, which helped them gain acceptance amongst the masses. They have profoundly influenced practices that Hinduism and Indian spiritual orders are associated with namely, vegetarianism, prohibition of animal slaughter and ahimsa (non-violence).

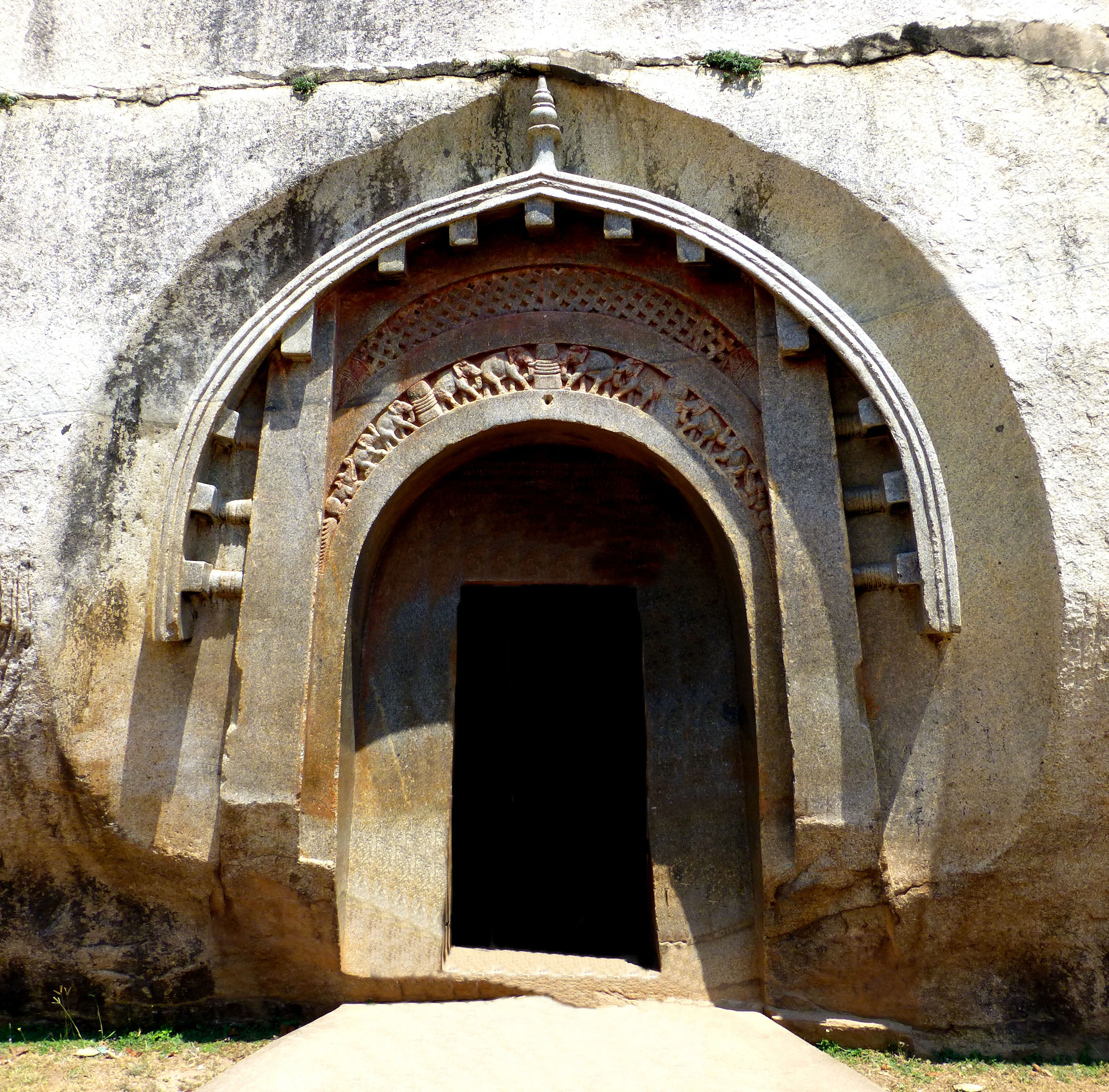
Entrance to the Lomas Rishi cave, 5th century BCE, Barabar hills.

=== Vajjika league ===
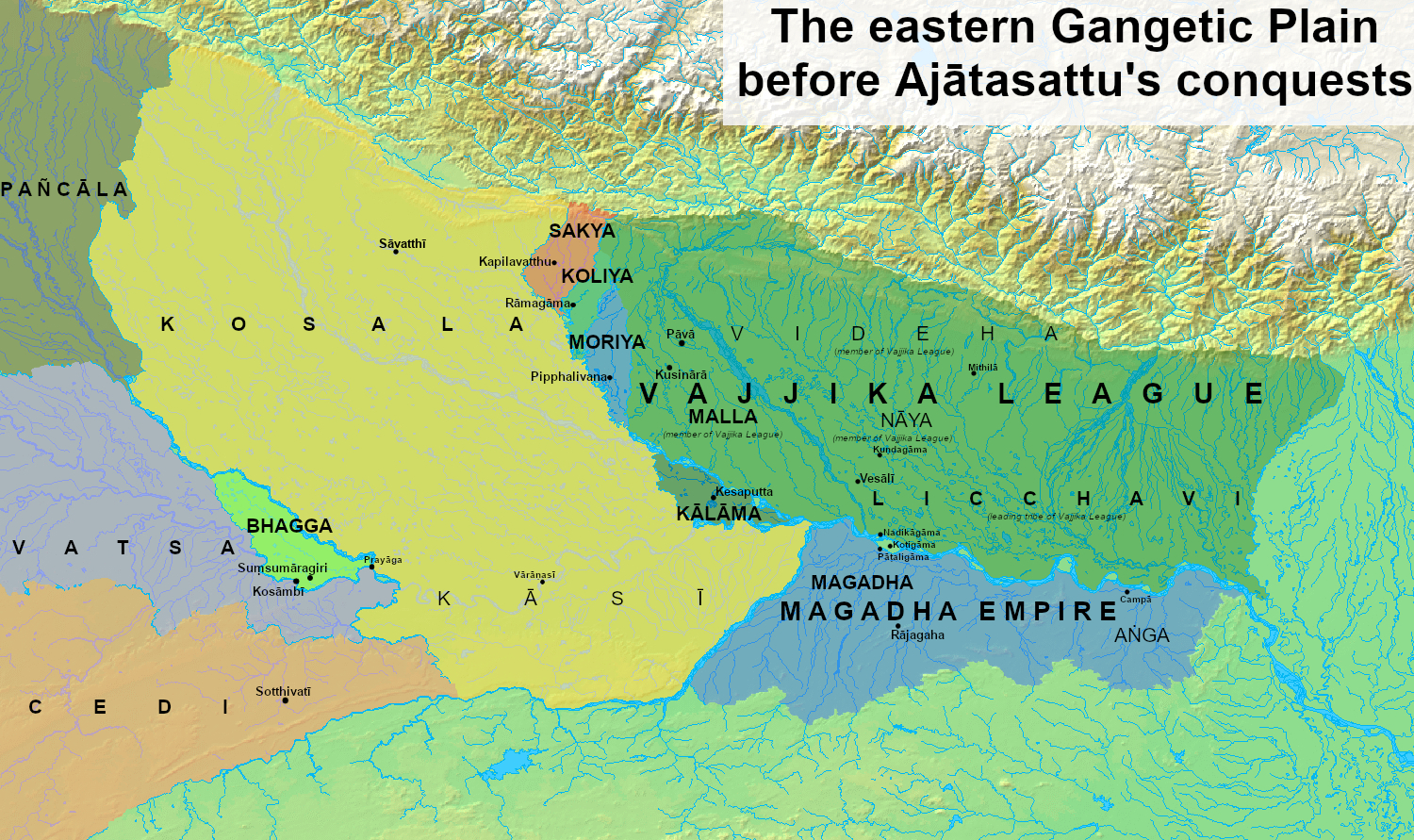
The Vajjika league at its peak around the 5th century BCE

The Vajjika League was a league of republican tribal states under the leadership of the Licchavikas centred around the city of Vesālī. The other members of the league were the Vaidehas in the Mithila region, the Nāyikas of Kuṇḍapura, and the Vajji tribe proper, who were dependencies of the Licchavikas. The Mallakas, who were organised into two separate republics, were also part of the Vajjika League, although they were not dependencies of the Licchavikas and therefore maintained their independence and sovereign rights within the confederation, hence why Jain sources considered the Licchavikas and the neighbouring Mallakas of Kusinārā and Pāvā to be the republican states of Kāsī-Kosala.

=== Early Magadha Empire ===
According to both Buddhist texts and Jain texts, one of Pradyota tradition was that the King's son would kill his father to become the successor. During this time, it was reported that there were high crimes in Magadha. The people rose up and elected Shishunaga to become the new king, who destroyed the power of the Pradyotas and created the Shishunaga dynasty. Shishunaga (also called King Sisunaka) was the founder of a dynasty collectively called the Shishunaga dynasty. He established the Magadha empire (in 684 BC). Due in part to this bloody dynastic feuding, it is thought that a civil revolt led to the emergence of the Shishunaga dynasty. This empire, with its original capital in Rajgriha, later shifted to Pataliputra (both currently in the Indian state of Bihar). The Shishunaga dynasty was one of the largest empires of the Indian subcontinent.

Magadha

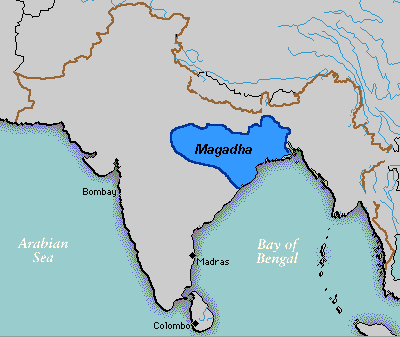
Pataliputra as a capital of the Kingdom of Magadha (6th–4th centuries BC).

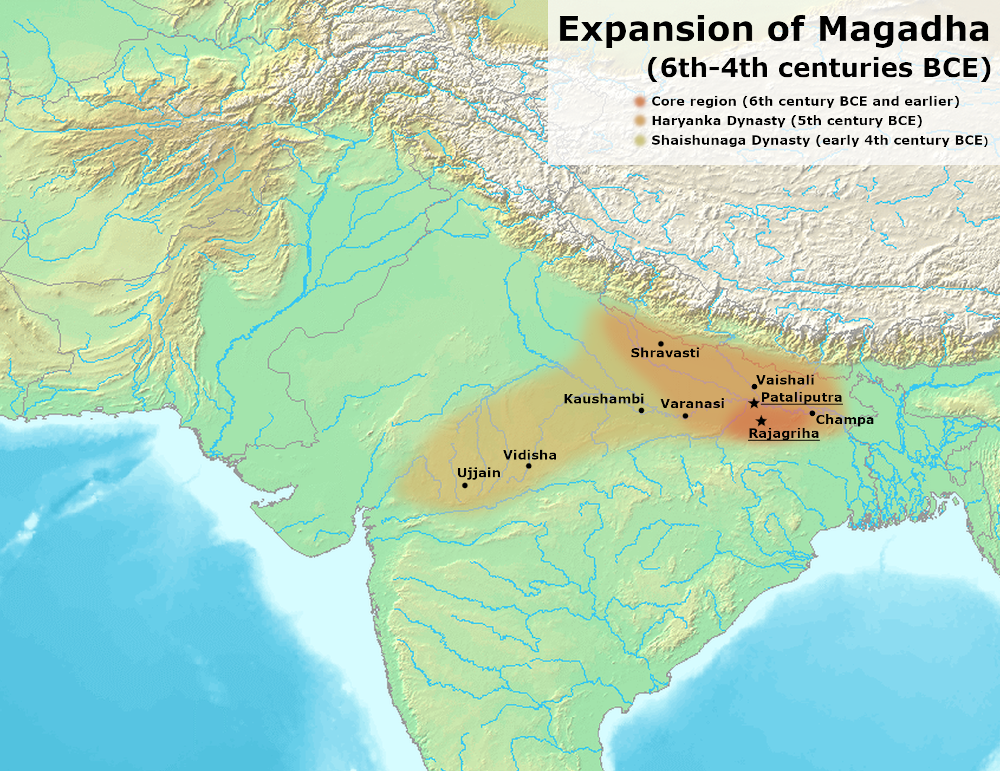
Approximate extent of the Haryanka dynasty and Shaishunaga dynasty.

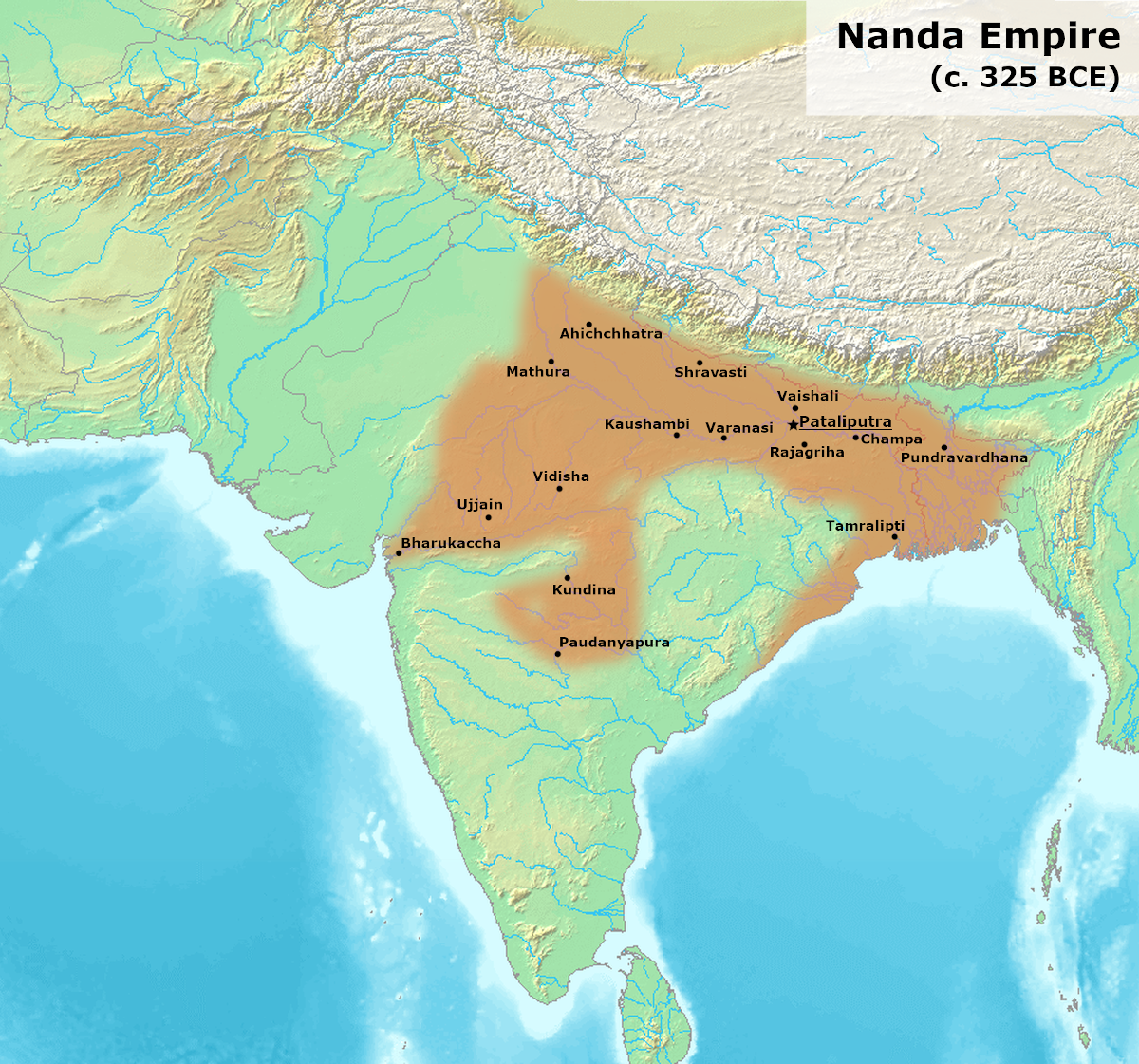
The Nanda Empire at its greatest extent under Dhana Nanda c. 323 BC.

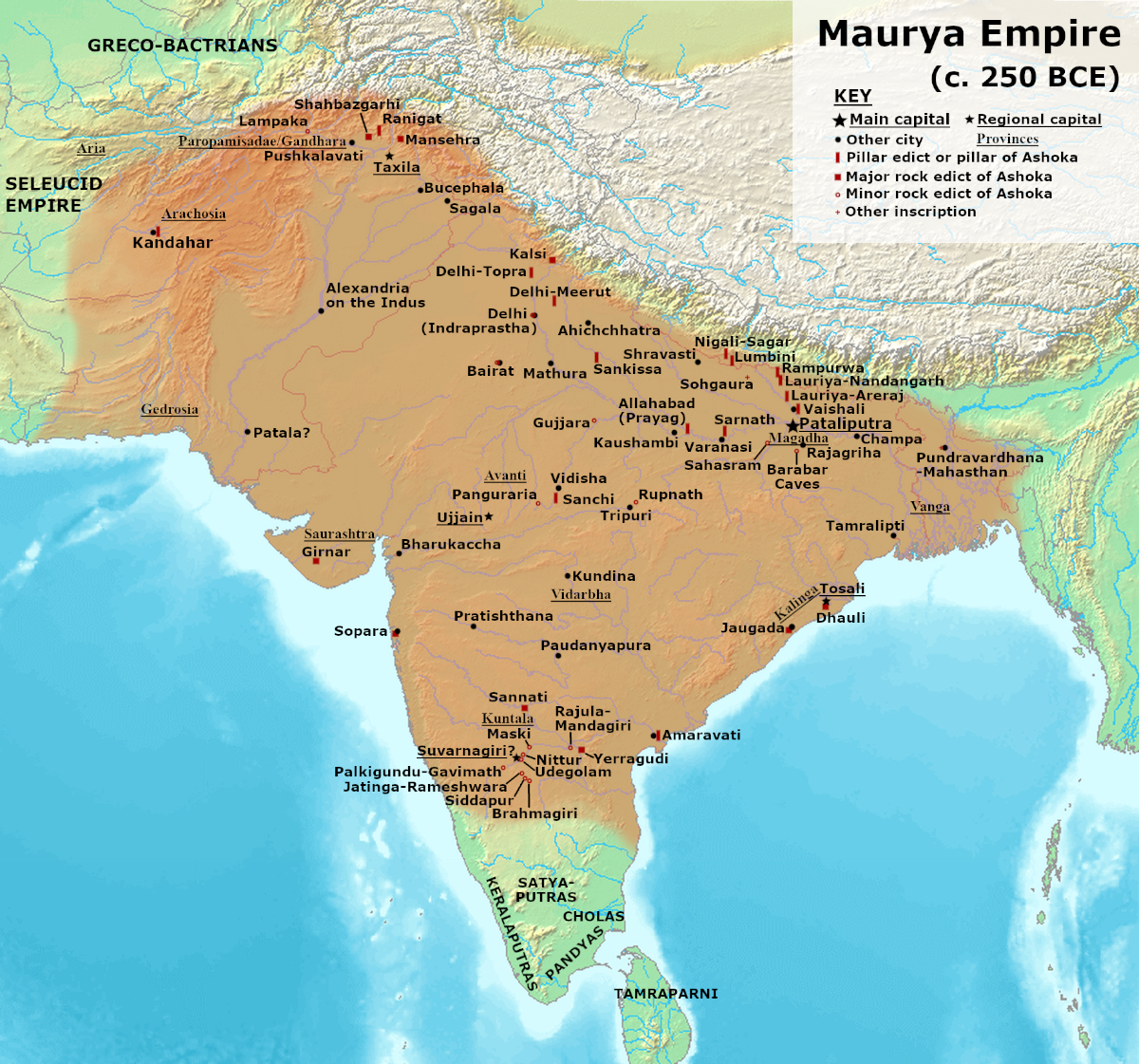
The Maurya Empire at its largest extent under Ashoka.

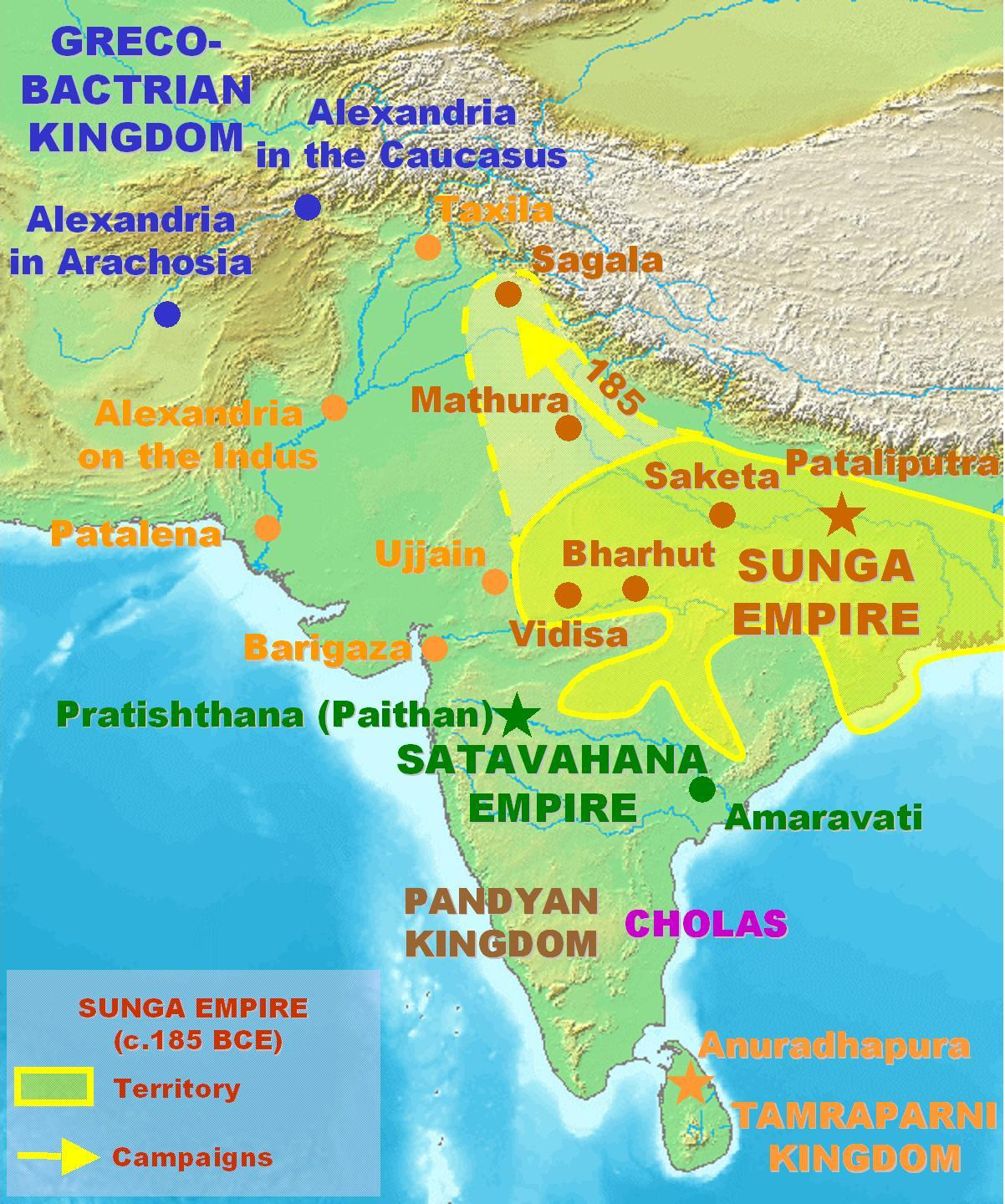
The Shunga Empire at its greatest extent - c. 185 BC.

The Hariyanka dynasty king Bimbisara was responsible for expanding the boundaries of his kingdom through matrimonial alliances and conquest. The land of Kosala fell to Magadha in this way. Estimates place the territory ruled by this early dynasty at 300 leagues in diameter and encompassing 80,000 small settlements. Bimbisara is contemporary with the Buddha, and is recorded as a lay disciple. Bimbisara (543–493 BC) was imprisoned and killed by his son who became his successor, Ajatashatru (491–461 BC), under whose rule, the dynasty reached its largest extent.

Licchavi was an ancient—before the birth of Mahavira— republic in what is now the Bihar state of India. Vaishali was the capital of Licchavi and the Vajjika League. The Mahavamsa tells that a courtesan in that city, Ambapali, was famous for her beauty, and helped in large measure in making the city prosperous.

Ajatashatru went to war with the Licchavi several times. Ajatashatru is thought to have ruled from 551 BC to 519 BC and moved the capital of the Magadha kingdom from Rajagriha to Pataliputra. The Mahavamsa tells that Udayabhadra eventually succeeded his father, Ajatashatru, and that under him Pataliputra became the largest city in the world. He is thought to have ruled for sixteen years. The kingdom had a particularly bloody succession. Anuruddha eventually succeeded Udaybhadra through assassination, and his son Munda succeeded him in the same fashion, as his son Nagadasaka.

This dynasty lasted until 424 BC when it was overthrown by the Nanda dynasty. This period saw the development in Magadha of two of India's major religions. Gautama Buddha in the 6th or 5th century BC was the founder of Buddhism, which later spread to East Asia and Southeast Asia, while Mahavira revived and propagated the ancient sramanic religion of Jainism.

The Nanda dynasty was established by an illegitimate son of King Mahanandin from the previous Shishunaga dynasty. The Nanda dynasty ruled Magadha during the 5th and 4th centuries BC. At its greatest extent, the Nanda Empire extended from Burma in the east, Balochistan in the west and probably as far south as Karnataka. Mahapadma Nanda of the Nanda dynasty, has been described as the destroyer of all the Kshatriyas. He defeated the Ikshvaku dynasty, as well as the Panchalas, Kasis, Haihayas, Kalingas, Asmakas, Kurus, Maithilas, Surasenas and the Vitihotras. He expanded his territory to the south of Deccan. Mahapadma Nanda died at the age of 88 and, therefore, he ruled during most of the period of this dynasty, which lasted 100 years.

In 321 BC, exiled general Chandragupta Maurya, with the help of Chanakya, founded the Maurya dynasty after overthrowing the reigning Nanda king Dhana Nanda to establish the Maurya Empire. The Maurya Empire (322–185 BC), ruled by the Mauryan dynasty, was geographically extensive, powerful and a political-military empire in ancient India. During this time, most of the subcontinent was united under a single government for the first time. The exceptions were present-day Tamil Nadu and Kerala (which was a Tamil kingdom at that time). The empire had its capital city at Pataliputra (near modern Patna). The Mauryan empire under Chandragupta Maurya would not only conquer most of the Indian subcontinent, defeating and conquering the satraps left by Alexander the Great but also push its boundaries into Persia and Central Asia, conquering the Gandhara region. Chandragupta Maurya then defeated an invasion led by Seleucus I, a Greek general from Alexander's army. Chandragupta Maurya's minister, Kautilya Chanakya, wrote the Arthashastra, a treatise on economics, politics, foreign affairs, administration, military arts, war and religion.

Chandragupta Maurya was succeeded by his son, Bindusara, who expanded the kingdom over most of present-day India, other than the extreme south and east. At its greatest extent, the Empire stretched to the north along the natural boundaries of the Himalayas, and to the east stretching into what is now Assam. To the west, it reached beyond modern Pakistan, annexing Balochistan and much of what is now Afghanistan. The Empire was extended into India's central and southern regions by the emperors Chandragupta and Bindusara, but it excluded the republic of Kalinga.

The Maurya Empire was inherited by Bindusara's son, Ashoka. Ashoka initially sought to expand his kingdom but in the aftermath of the carnage caused during the invasion of Kalinga, he renounced bloodshed and pursued a policy of non-violence or ahimsa after converting to Buddhism. Following the conquest of Kalinga, Ashoka ended the military expansion of the empire and led the empire through more than 40 years of relative peace, harmony and prosperity. Ashoka's response to the Kalinga War is recorded in the Edicts of Ashoka, one of the oldest preserved historical documents of the Indian subcontinent.

According to Rock Edicts of Ashoka:

"Beloved-of-the-Gods [Ashoka], King Priyadarsi, conquered the Kalingas eight years after his coronation. 150000 were deported, 100000 were killed and many more died (from other causes). After the Kalingas had been conquered, Beloved-of-the-Gods came to feel a strong inclination towards the Dhamma, a love for the Dhamma and instruction in Dhamma. Now Beloved-of-the-Gods feels deep remorse for having conquered the Kalingas."

— Ashoka, S. Dhammika, The Edicts of King Ashoka, Kandy, Buddhist Publications Society (1994) ISBN 955-24-0104-6

The Mauryan Empire under Ashoka was responsible for the proliferation of Buddhist ideals across the whole of East Asia and Southeast Asia. Under Ashoka, India was a prosperous and stable empire of great economic and military power whose political influence and trade extended across Asia and into Europe. Chandragupta Maurya's embrace of Jainism increased social and religious renewal and reform across his society, while Ashoka embraced Buddhism. Ashoka sponsored the spreading of Buddhist ideals into Sri Lanka and South-East Asia. The Lion Capital of Ashoka at Sarnath, is the emblem of India. Archaeologically, the period of Mauryan rule in South Asia falls into the era of Northern Black Polished Ware (NBPW). The Arthashastra, the Edicts of Ashoka and Ashokavadana are primary sources of written records of the Mauryan times.

Ashoka was followed for 50 years by a succession of weaker kings. Brihadrata, the last ruler of the Mauryan dynasty, held territories that had shrunk considerably from the time of emperor Ashoka, although he still upheld the Buddhist faith.

== Middle Kingdoms (230 BC – 1206 AD) ==
Middle Kingdom

The Pala Empire and neighbourhoods in the 9th century CE.

Art, Science and education in
Middle Kingdom

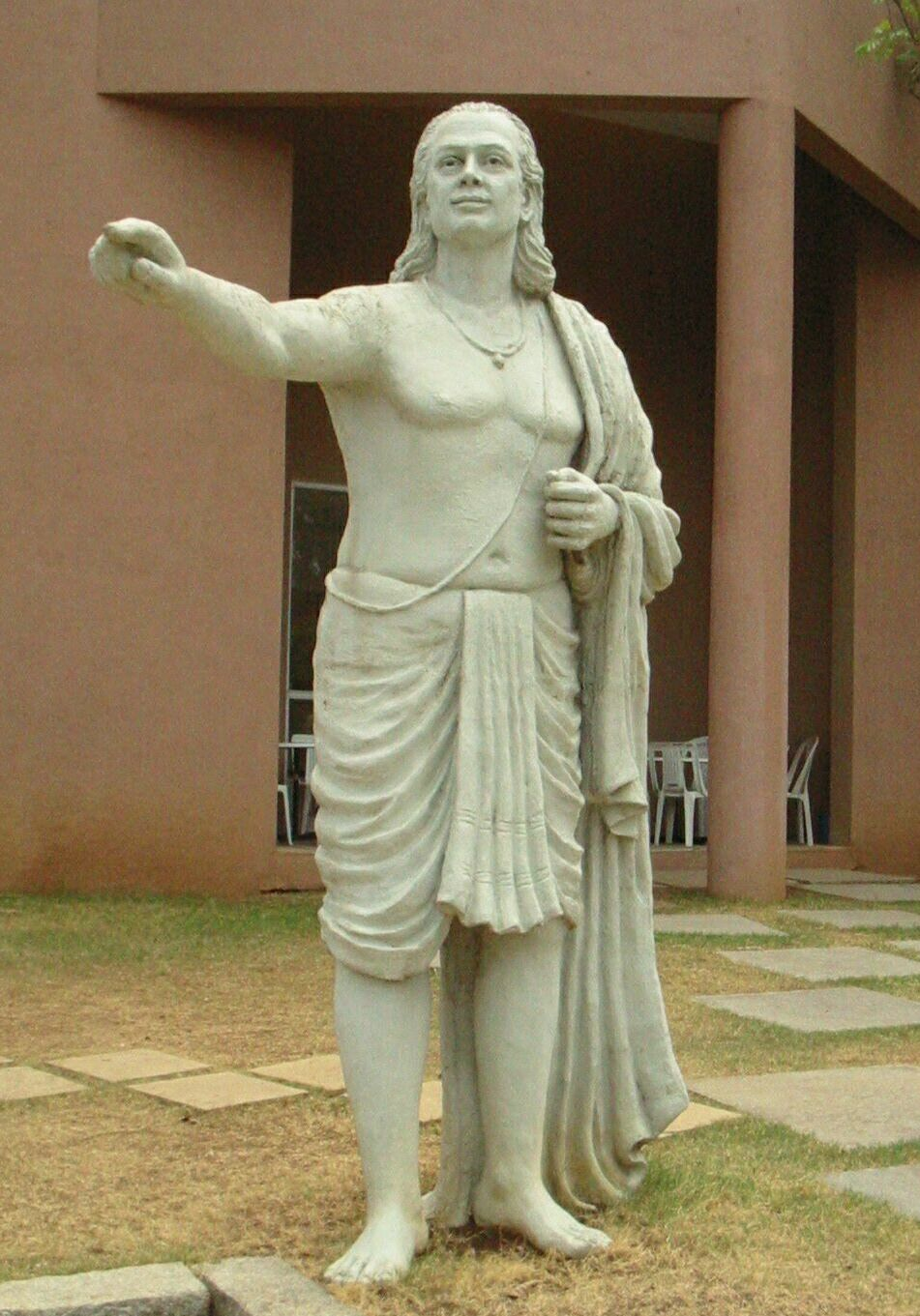
Aryabhata came to Kusumapura (modern Patna) for higher studies and lived here. (PictureStatue of Aryabhata at IUCAA)

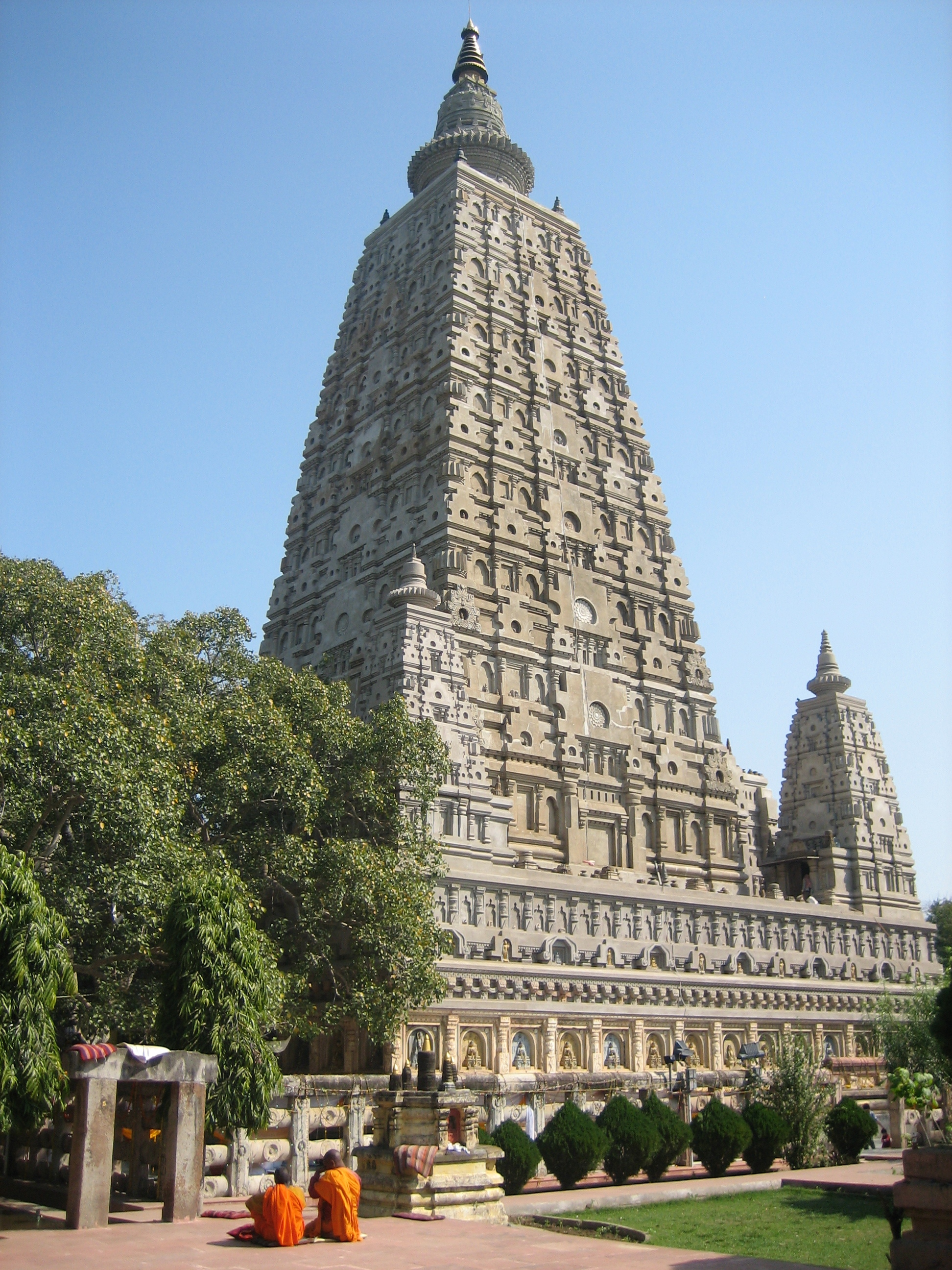
The current structure of the Mahabodhi Temple dates to the Gupta era, 5th century CE.Palas.

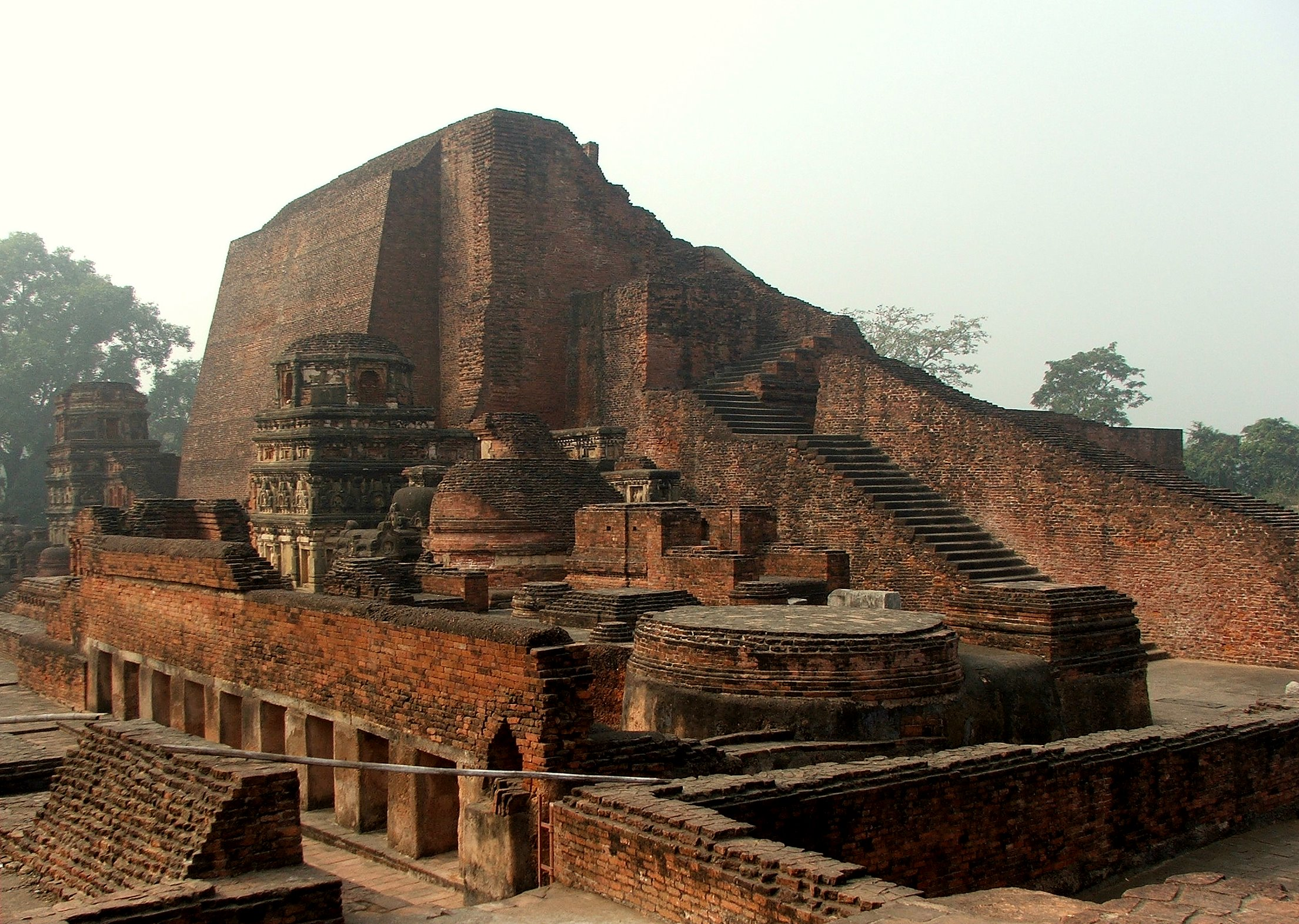
Nalanda is considered one of the first great universities in recorded history. It was the centre of Buddhist learning and research in the world from 450 to 1193 CE. It reached its height under the

=== Shunga Dynasty ===
The Shunga dynasty was established in 185 BCE, about fifty years after the Ashoka's death, when the king Brihadratha, the last of the Mauryan rulers, was assassinated by the then commander-in-chief of the Mauryan armed forces, Pushyamitra Shunga.

Pushyamitra Shunga was a Brahmin who then took over the throne and established the Shunga dynasty. Buddhist records such as the Ashokavadana write that the assassination of Brihadrata and the rise of the Shunga empire led to a wave of persecution of Buddhists, and a resurgence of Hinduism. According to John Marshall, Pushyamitra Shunga may have been the main author of the persecutions, although later Shunga kings seem to have been more supportive of Buddhism. Other historians, such as Etienne Lamotte and Romila Thapar, partially support this view.

=== Gupta Empire ===
The Gupta Empire ruled from around 240 to 579 CE. The dynasty was established by Gupta, succeeded by Ghatotkacha (c. 280–319) AD, had a son named Chandragupta I (Not to be confused with Chandragupta Maurya (340–293 BC), founder of the Mauryan Empire). In a breakthrough deal, Chandragupta I was married to a woman from Lichchhavi—the main power in Magadha.

Samudragupta succeeded Chandragupta I in 335, and ruled for about 45 years, until he died in 380. He attacked the kingdoms of Shichchhatra, Padmavati, Malwas, the Yaudheyas, the Arjunayanas, the Maduras and the Abhiras, and merged them in his kingdom. By his death in 380, he had incorporated over twenty kingdoms into his realm, his rule extended from the Himalayas to the river Narmada and from the Brahmaputra to the Yamuna. He gave himself the titles King of Kings and World Monarch. He is considered the Napoleon of India. Chandragupta I performed Ashwamedha Yajna to underline the importance of his conquest.

Chandragupta II, the Sun of Power (Vikramaditya), ruled from 380 until 413. Only marginally less successful than his father, Chandragupta II expanded his realm westwards, defeating the Saka Western Kshatrapas of Malwa, Gujarat and Saurashtra in a campaign lasting until 409. Chandragupta II was succeeded by his son Kumaragupta I. Known as the Mahendraditya, he ruled until 455. Towards the end of his reign a tribe in the Narmada valley, the Pushyamitras, rose in power to threaten the empire.

Skandagupta is generally considered the last of the great rulers. He defeated the Pushyamitra threat, but then was faced with invading Hephthalites or Huna, from the northwest. He repulsed a Huna attack c. 477. Skandagupta died in 487 and was succeeded by his son Narasimhagupta Baladitya.

The Gupta Empire was one of the largest political and military empires in ancient India. The Gupta period is referred to as the Classical Age of India by most historians. The time of the Gupta Empire was an "Indian Golden Age" in Indian science, technology, engineering, art, dialectic, literature, logic, mathematics, astronomy, religion and philosophy.

The difference between the Gupta Empire's and Mauryan Empire's administration was that in the Mauryan administration power was centralised but in the Gupta administration power was more decentralised. The empire was divided into provinces and the provinces were further divided into districts. Villages were the smallest units. The kingdom covered Gujarat, North-East India, south-eastern Pakistan, Odisha, northern Madhya Pradesh and eastern India with capital at Pataliputra, modern Patna. All forms of worship were carried out in Sanskrit.

Rapid strides were made in astronomy during this period. Aryabhata and Varahamihira were two great astronomers and mathematicians. Aryabhata stated that the Earth moved around the Sun and rotated on its axis. Aryabhata, who is believed to be the first to come up with the concept of zero, postulated the theory that the Earth moves round the Sun, and studied solar and lunar eclipses. Aryabhata's most famous work was Aryabhatiya. Varahamihira's most important contributions are the encyclopaedic Brihat-Samhita and Pancha-Siddhantika (Pañcasiddhāntikā). Metallurgy also made rapid strides. The proof can be seen in the Iron Pillar of Vaishali and near Mehrauli on the outskirts of Delhi, which was brought from Bihar.

This period is also very rich in Sanskrit literature. The material sources of this age were Kalidasa's works. Raghuvamsa, Malavikagnimitram, Meghadūta, Abhijñānaśākuntala and Kumārasambhava, Mṛcchakatika by Shudraka, Panchatantra by Vishnu Sharma, Kama Sutra (the principles of pleasure) and 13 plays by Bhasa were also written in this period.

In medicine, the Guptas were notable for their establishment and patronage of free hospitals. Although progress in physiology and biology was hindered by religious injunctions against contact with dead bodies, which discouraged dissection and anatomy, Indian physicians excelled in pharmacopoeia, caesarean section, bone setting, and skin grafting. Indeed, Hindu medical advances were soon adopted in the Arab and Western worlds. Ayurveda was the main medical system.

According to some historian's work,

The Gupta Empire is considered by many scholars to be the "classical age" of Hindu and Buddhist art and literature. The Rulers of the Gupta Empire were strong supporters of developments in the arts, architecture, science, and literature. The Gupta Empire circulated a large number of gold coins, called dinars, with their inscriptions. The Gupta Dynasty also left behind an effective administrative system. During times of peace, the Gupta Empire system was decentralised, with only taxation flowing to the capital at Pataliputra. During times of war, however, the government realigned and fought its invaders. The system was soon extinguished in fighting off the Hunnic Invasions.

=== Later Gupta dynasty ===
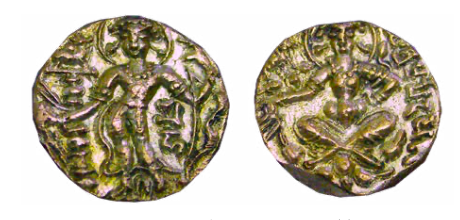
Archer type coinage of King Mahasenagupta of the Later Gupta dynasty, c. 6th century CE

The Later Gupta dynasty ruled the Magadha region in eastern India between the 6th and 7th centuries AD. The Later Guptas succeeded the Imperial Guptas as the rulers of Magadha, but there is no evidence connecting the two dynasties; these appear to be two distinct families. The Later Guptas are so-called because the names of their rulers ended with the suffix "-gupta", which they might have adopted to portray themselves as the legitimate successors of the imperial Guptas.

=== Pala Dynasty ===
The Pala Empire was a Buddhist dynasty that ruled from the Bengal region of the Indian subcontinent. The name Pala (Modern Bengali: পাল pal) means protector and was used as an ending to the names of all Pala monarchs. The Palas were followers of the Mahayana and Tantric schools of Buddhism. Gopala was the first ruler of the dynasty. He came to power in 750 in Gaur by a democratic election. This event is recognised as one of the first democratic elections in South Asia since the time of the Mahā Janapadas. He reigned from 750 to 770 and consolidated his position by extending his control over all of Bengal as well as parts of Bihar. The Buddhist dynasty lasted for four centuries (750–1120 CE).

The empire reached its peak under Dharmapala and Devapala. Dharmapala extended the empire into the northern parts of the Indian subcontinent. This triggered once again the power struggle for the control of the subcontinent. Devapala, successor of Dharmapala, expanded the empire to cover much of South Asia and beyond. His empire stretched from Assam and Utkala in the east, Kamboja (modern-day Afghanistan) in the north-west and Deccan in the south. According to Pala copperplate inscription, Devapala exterminated the Utkalas, conquered the Pragjyotisha (Assam), shattered the pride of the Huna, and humbled the lords of Gurjara-Pratiharas, Gurjara and the Dravidas.

The Palas created many temples and works of art as well as supported the Universities of Nalanda and Vikramashila. Both Nalanda University and Vikramshila University reached their peak under the Palas. The universities received an influx of students from many parts of the world. Bihar and Bengal were invaded by the south Indian Emperor Rajendra Chola I of the Chola dynasty in the 11th century. The Pala Empire eventually disintegrated in the 12th century under the attack of the Sena dynasty. Pala Empire was the last empire of middle kingdoms whose capital was once in Pataliputra (modern Patna) under Devapala's rule.

== Medieval Period (1206–1526) ==
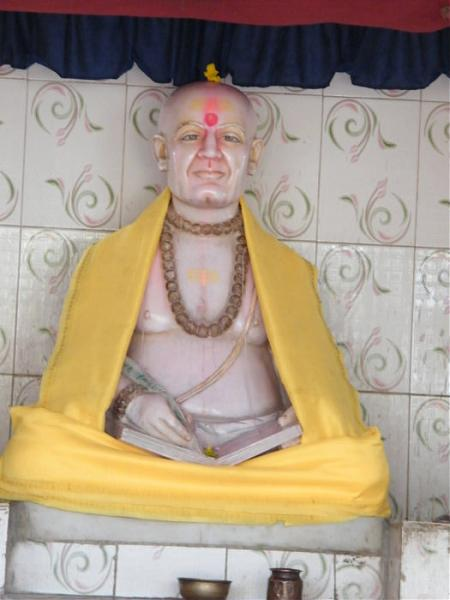
11th-century Hindu philosopher Udayana

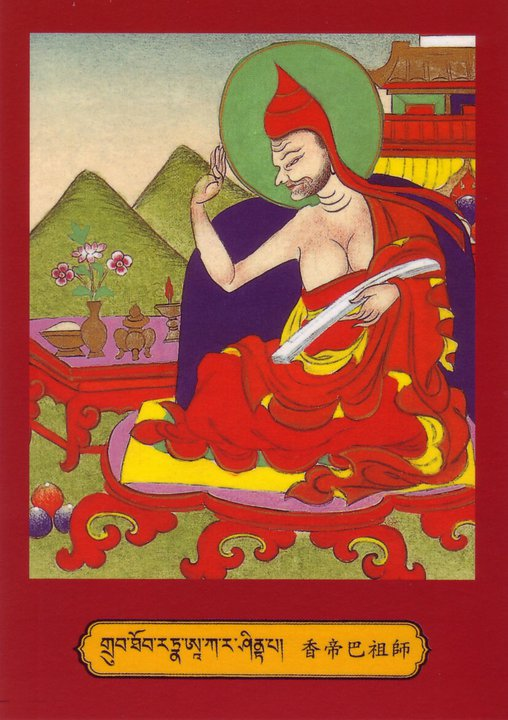
11th-century Vajrayana Buddhist philosopher, Ratnākaraśānti

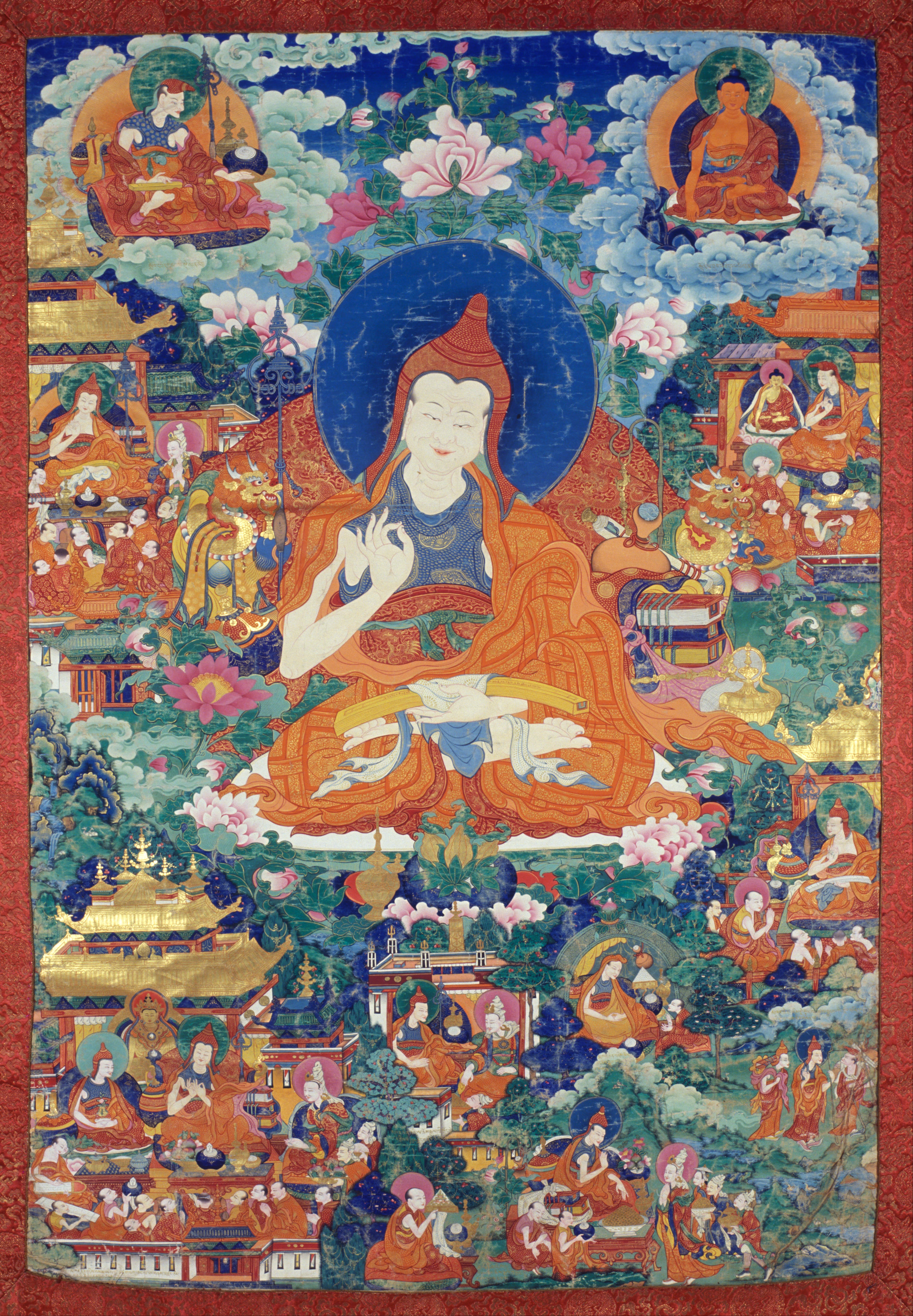
8th-century Buddhist Abbot of Nalanda, Śāntarakṣita

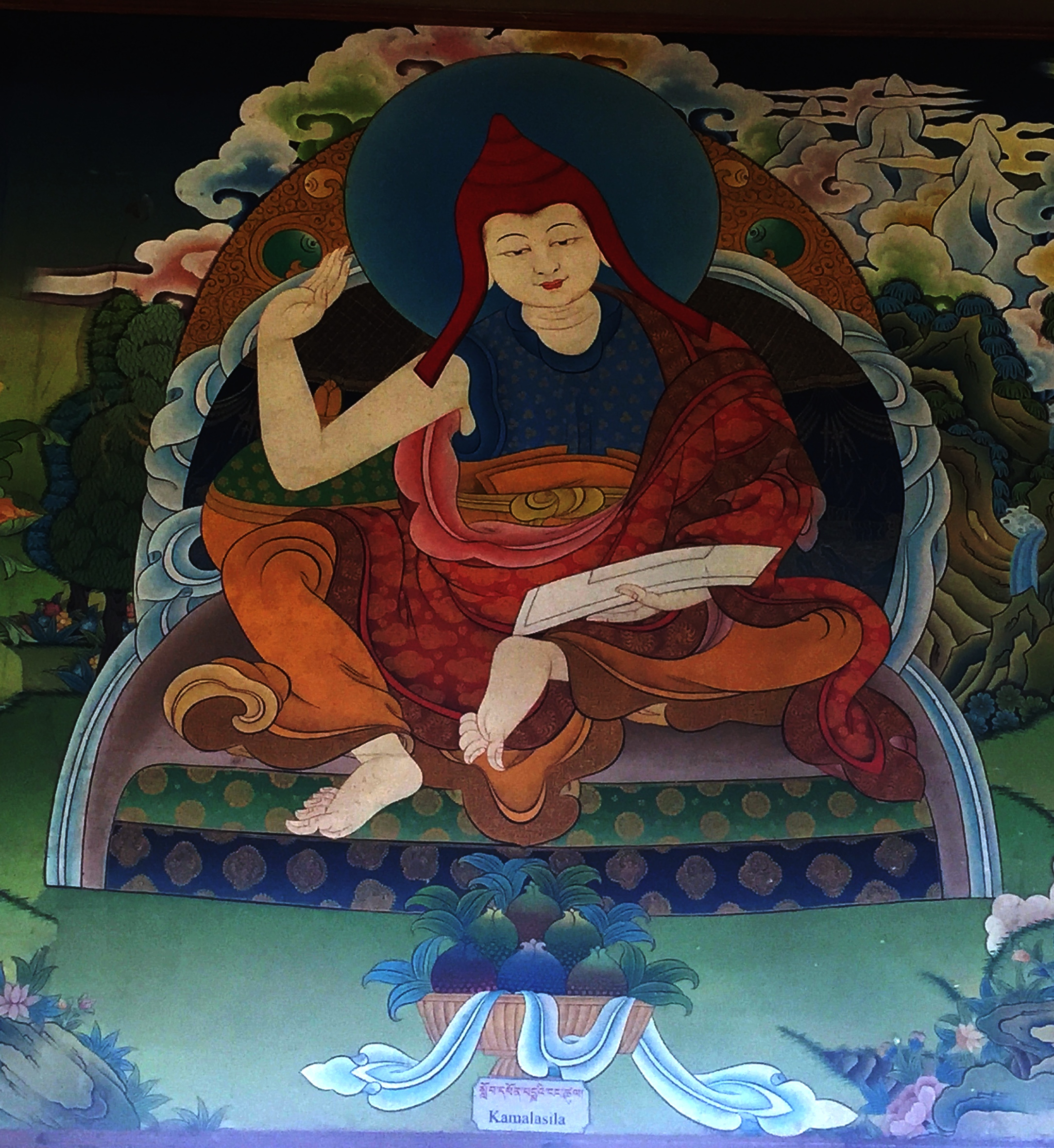
8th-century Buddhist philosopher of Nalanda, Kamalaśīla

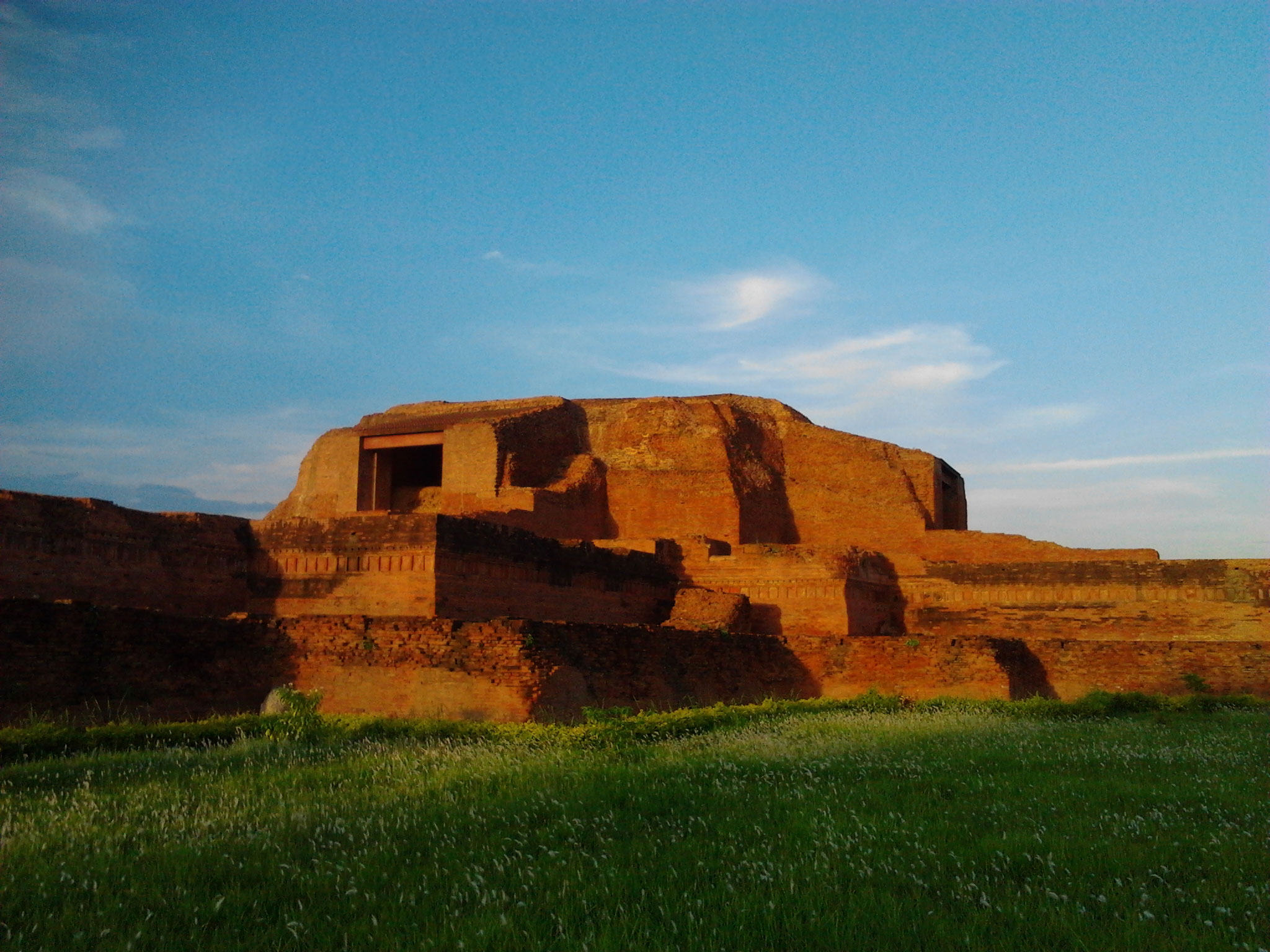
The main stupa at the monastery of Vikramashila

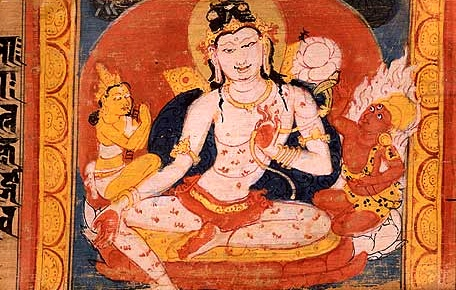
Palm leaf painting from medieval Nalanda

During the medieval period, Bihar was controlled by various small kingdoms and principalities. Bihar also experienced its first encounter with foreign aggression from the West and Muslim armies came to approach its border. With the advent of foreign aggression and eventual foreign subjugation of India, Bihar passed through very uncertain times during the medieval period. Muhammad of Ghor attacked this region of the Indian subcontinent many times. Muhammad of Ghor's armies destroyed many Buddhist structures, including the great Nalanda University.

The Buddhism of Magadha was finally swept away by the Islamic invasion under Muhammad Bin Bakhtiar Khilji, one of Qutb-ud-Din's generals destroyed monasteries fortified by the Sena armies, during which many of the viharas and the famed universities of Nalanda and Vikramshila were destroyed, and thousands of Buddhist monks were massacred in the 12th century.

However, North Bihar/Mithila maintained its autonomy for longer than the rest of Bihar and was under the control of native dynasties until at least the sixteenth century.

=== Mithila ===
==== Karnat dynasty (1097-1324) ====
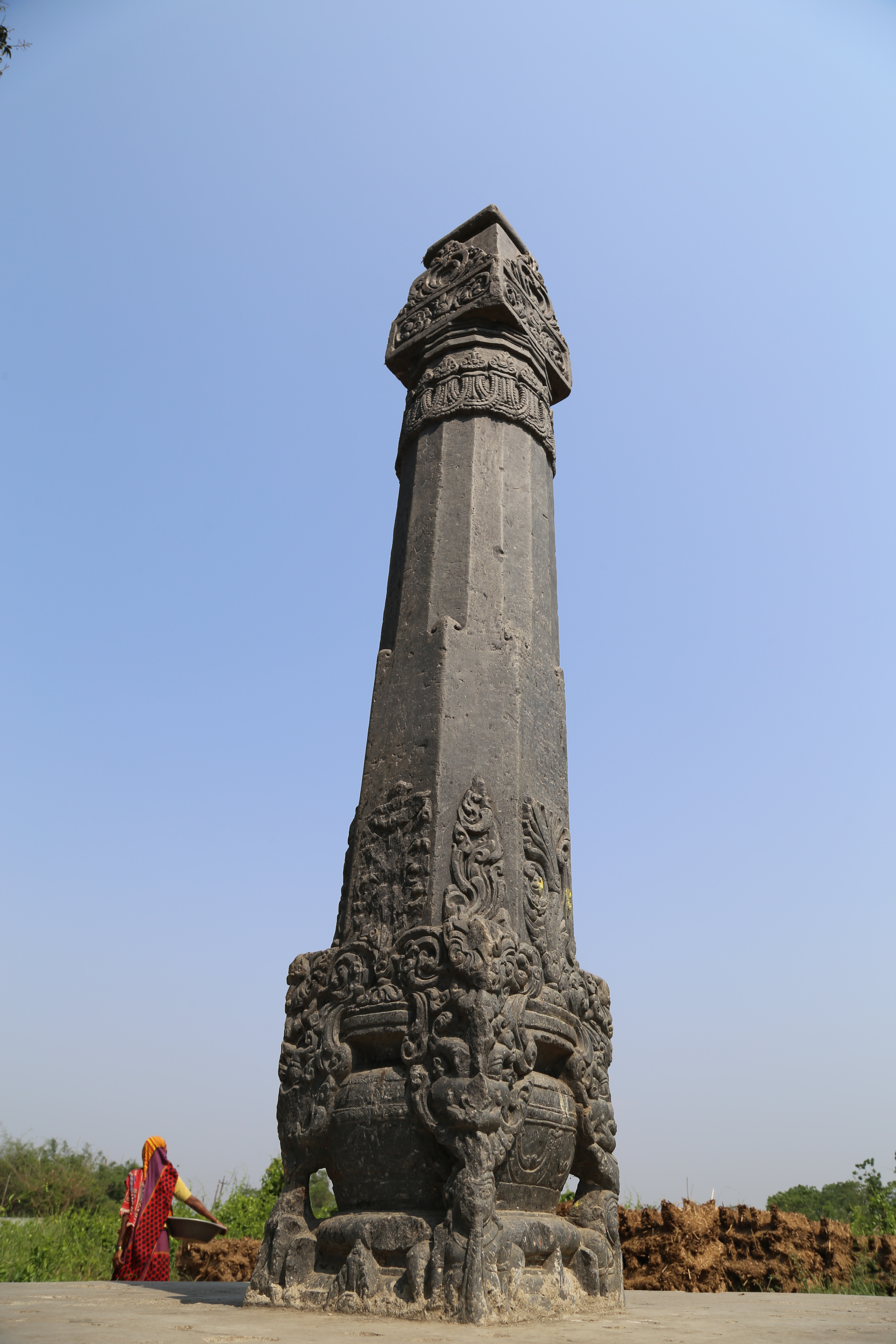
Pillar from the Karnat capital of Simraungadh

In 1097 AD, the Karnat dynasty of Mithila emerged on the Bihar/Nepal border area and maintained capitals in Darbhanga and Simraongadh. The dynasty was established by Nanyadeva, a military commander of Karnataka origin. Under this dynasty, the Maithili language started to develop with the first piece of Maithili literature, the Varna Ratnakara being produced in the 14th century by Jyotirishwar Thakur. The Karnats also carried out raids into Nepal. They fell in 1324 following the invasion of Ghiyasuddin Tughlaq.

==== Oiniwar dynasty (1325-1526) ====
The Oiniwar dynasty emerged after the fall of the Karnats and ruled North Bihar as vassals of the Delhi Sultanate. Under the king, Shiva Singh, they declared independence ,even repulsing invasions from the neighboring Jaunpur Sultanate and Bengal Sultanate.

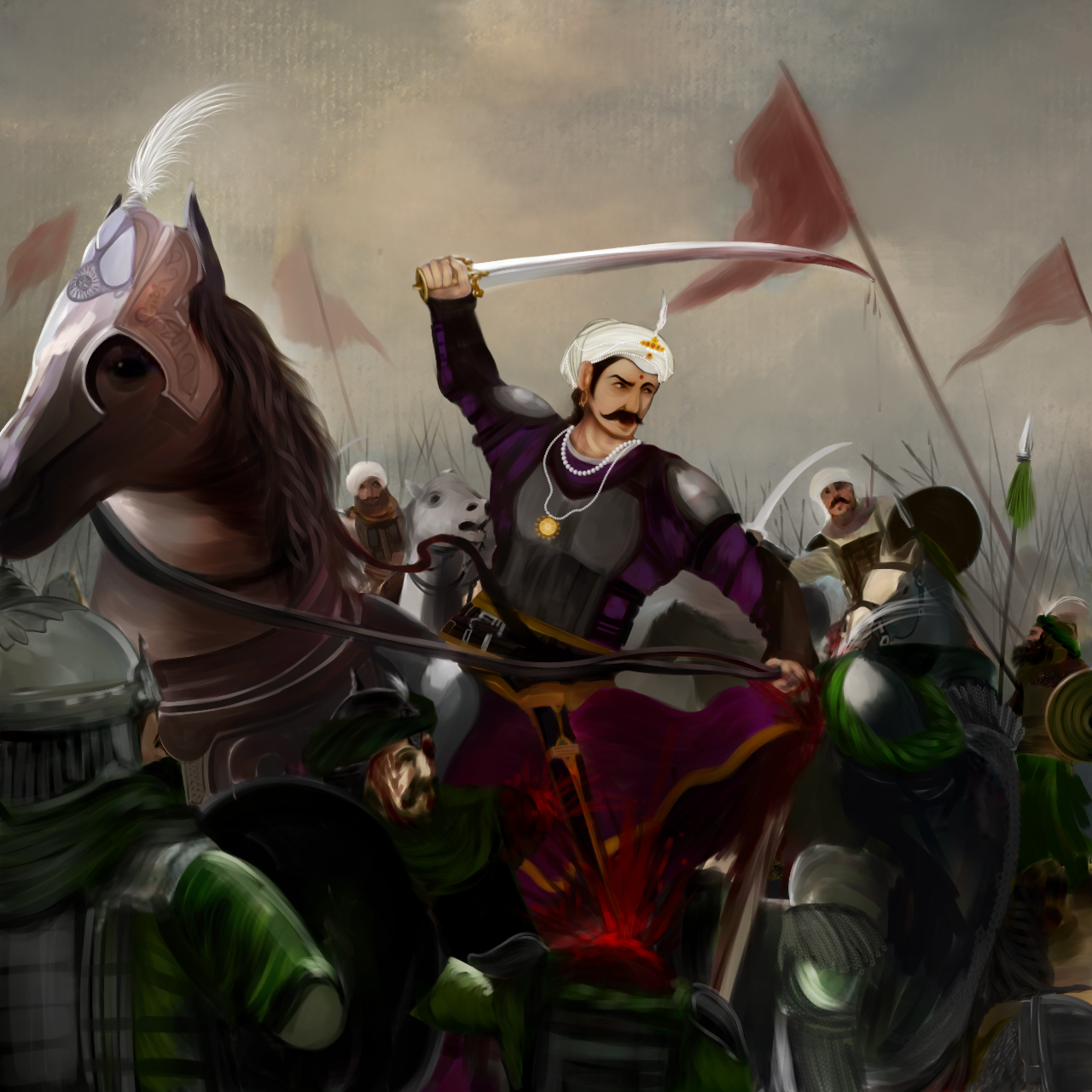
Maharaja Shiva Simha Singh in a war against Mohammedan Kings

They were contemporaries of the Jaunpur Sultanate.

=== Rest of Bihar ===
==== Pithipatis (1120-1290) ====
During the late Pala period, the area of Magadha was ruled by Buddhist kings with the title of Pīṭhīpati. They were patrons of the Mahabodhi Temple and referred to themselves as magadhādipati (rulers of Magadha). They maintained a presence in the region until at least the 13th century.

==== Cheros ====
After the fall of the Pala empire, the Cheros established a tribal polity that ruled some parts of southern Bihar extending into modern-day Jharkhand from the 12th century to the 16th century until Mughal rule after which they were reduced to chieftains/Zamindars.

==== Khayaravala dynasty (11th-13th centuries) ====
The Khayaravalas were the ruling dynasty of the Son river valley in South Bihar and Jharkhand during the 11th to 13th centuries. Notable kings of this dynasty include Pratapdhavala and Shri Pratapa. They were also involved in the construction of Rohtasgarh fort.

==== Jaunpur Sultanate (1394–1493) ====
The Jaunpur Sultanate emerged in 1394 and controlled much of Western Bihar. Many coin hoards and inscriptions from the Jaunpur period have been found in Bihar.

== Early modern period (1526–1757) ==
=== Sur Empire ===
Medieval Bihar saw a period of glory lasting about six years during the rule of Sher Shah Suri, who hailed from Sasaram. Sher Shah Suri built the longest road of the Indian subcontinent, the Grand Trunk Road, which started at Calcutta (Bengal) and ended at Peshawar, now Pakistan. The economic reforms carried out by Sher Shah, such as the introduction of the Rupee and Custom Duties, are still used in the Republic of India. He revived the city of Patna, where he built his headquarters.

Hemu, the Hindu Emperor, the son of a food seller, and himself a vendor of saltpetre at Rewari, rose to become Chief of Army and Prime Minister under the command of Adil Shah Suri of the Suri Dynasty. He had won 22 battles against the Afghans, from Punjab to Bengal and had defeated Akbar's forces twice, at Agra and Delhi in 1556, before succeeding to the throne of Delhi and establishing a 'Hindu Raj' in North India, albeit for a short duration, from Purana Quila in Delhi. He was killed in the Second Battle of Panipat.

=== Zamindars of Bihar and the Mughals ===
During the period of Mughal rule, much of Bihar was under the sway of local Zamindars or chieftains who maintained their armies and territories. These chieftains retained much of their power until the arrival of the British East India Company.

In 1576, after the Battle of Tukaroi, Mughal Emperor Akbar conquered Bengal Sultanate and added it to his empire domain. He divided Bihar and Bengal each into one of his original twelve subahs (imperial top-level provinces; Bihar Subah with its seat at Patna) and the region passed through uneventful provincial rule during much of this period. Bihar was left under Mughal control until the Battle of Plassey in 1757.

Bihar passed into the control of Nawabs of Bengal under British suzerainty.

Prince Azim-us-Shan, the grandson of Aurangzeb was appointed as the governor of Bihar in 1703. Azim-us-Shan renamed Pataliputra or Patna as Azimabad, in 1704.

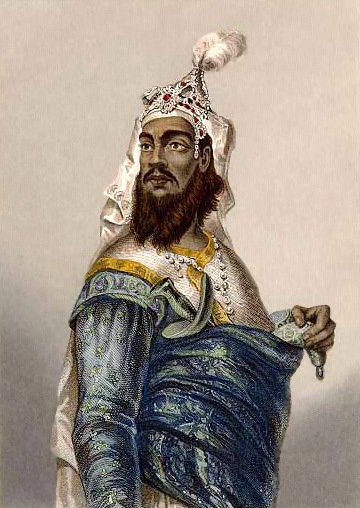
Veer Kunwar Singh, during India's First War of Independence in 1857, he led a select band of armed soldiers against the troops under the command of the British East India Company.

== Colonial Period (1757–1947) ==
=== British East India Company ===
After the Battle of Buxar, 1764, which was fought in Buxar, hardly 115 km from Patna, the Mughals as well as the Nawabs of Bengal lost effective control over the territories then constituting the province of Bengal, which currently comprises Bangladesh and the Indian states of West Bengal, Bihar, Jharkhand, Odisha. The British East India Company was accorded the diwani rights, that is, the right to administer the collection and management of revenues of the province of Bengal, and parts of Oudh, currently comprising a large part of Uttar Pradesh. The Diwani rights were legally granted by Shah Alam, who was then the sovereign Mughal emperor of India. During the rule of the British East India Company in Bihar, Patna emerged as an important commercial and trading centres of eastern India.

The first seeds of resentment against British rule emerged when Maharaja Fateh Bahadur Sahi, the chieftain of Huseypur in Saran district, initiated a struggle against the East India Company in 1767. His revolt escalated in 1781 when various other zamindars and chiefs in South Bihar began to join his revolt including Raja Narain Singh and Akbar Ali. The British were able to successfully put down the revolt.

Babu Kunwar Singh of Jagdishpur and his army, as well as countless other persons from Bihar, contributed to the India's First War of Independence (1857), also called the Sepoy Mutiny by some historians. Babu Kunwar Singh (1777–1858) one of the leaders of the Indian uprising of 1857 belonged to a royal Rajput house of Jagdispur, currently a part of Bhojpur district of Bihar. By that time Bihar had many feudal estates or zamindars. Most notably Tekari Raj, Raj Darbhanga, Bettiah Raj, Hathwa Raj, Kharagpur Raj, Banaili Estate and the Surajpura Raj. At the age of 80 years, during India's First War of Independence, he actively led a select band of armed soldiers against the troops under the command of the East India Company and also recorded victories in many battles.

Bihar
from 1776

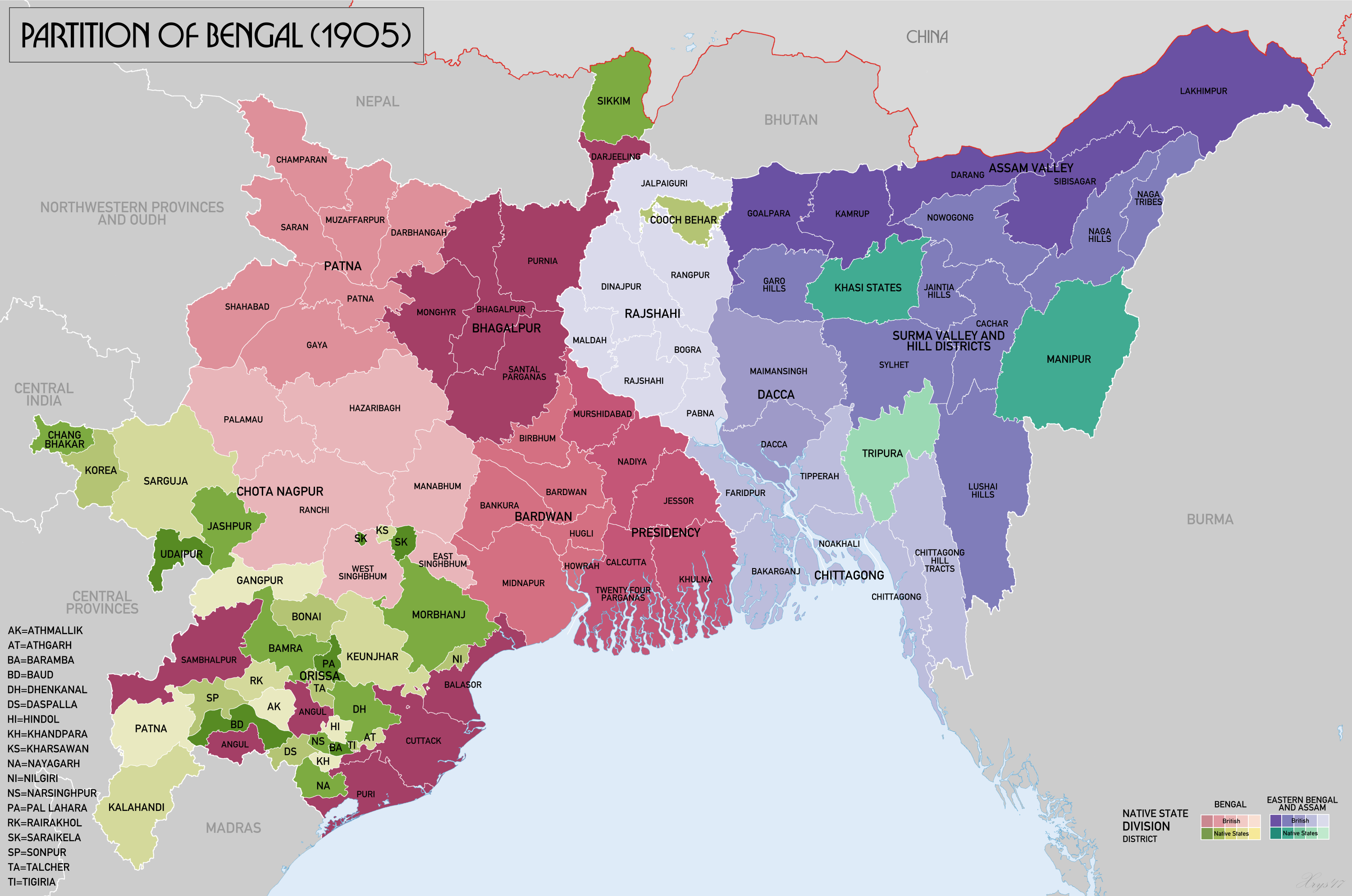
Bihar as part of
Bengal Presidency
(1776-1912)^{[Note 1]}

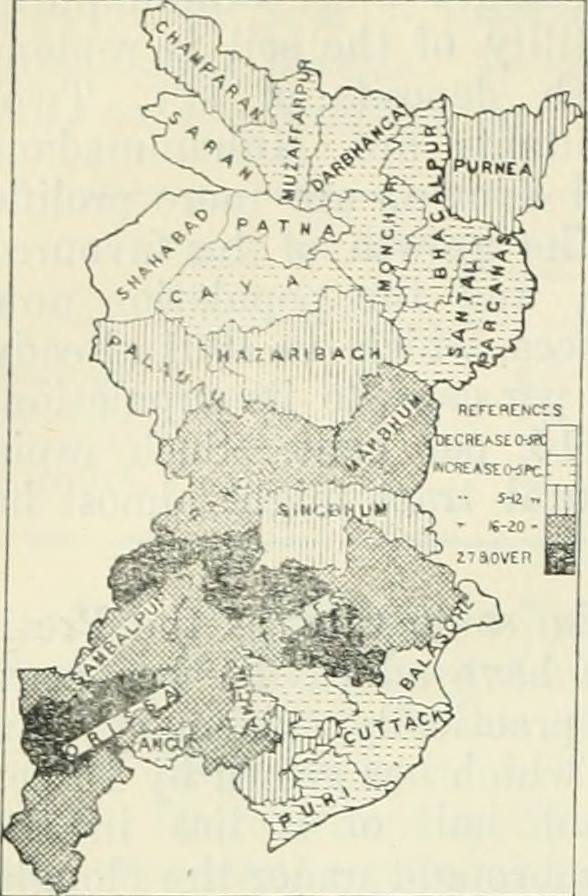
Bihar and Orissa Province
(1912-1936)

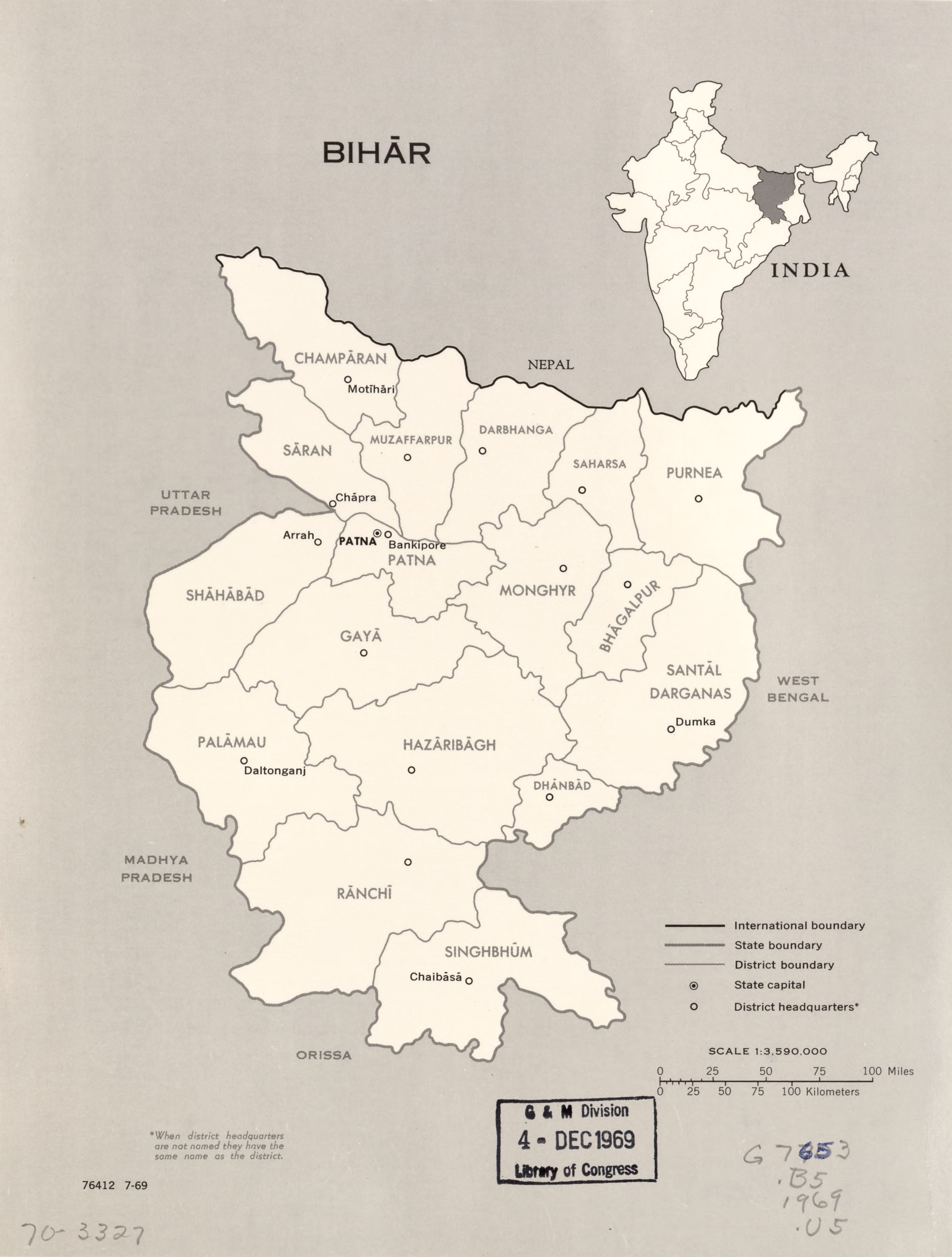
Bihar Province
(Pre-independence )
Bihar State
(Post-independence )
1936-2000

Bihar after
Bihar Jharkhand bifurcation
post 2011

[Note 1] : 1905 map of Bengal Presidency, British India

=== The British Raj ===
Under the British Raj, Bihar particularly Patna gradually started to attain its lost glory and emerged as an important and strategic centre of learning and trade in India. From this point, Bihar remained a part of the Bengal Presidency of the British Raj until 1912, when the province of Bihar and Orissa was carved out as a separate province. When the Bengal Presidency was partitioned in 1912 to carve out a separate province, Patna was made the capital of the new province. The city limits were stretched westwards to accommodate the administrative base, and the township of Bankipore took shape along the Bailey Road (originally spelt as Bayley Road, after the first Lt. Governor, Charles Stuart Bayley). This area was called the New Capital Area. The houses of the English residents were all at the west end at Bankipore. The greater part of the English residences were on the banks of the river, many of them being on the northern side of an open square, which formed the parade ground, and racecourse (present Gandhi Maidan). There was also the Golghar a wondrous bell-shaped building, one hundred feet high, with a winding outer staircase leading to the top, and a small entrance door at the base, which was intended for a granary, to be filled when there was the expectation of famine. It was initially considered to be both politically and materially impracticable.

To this day, locals call the old area the City whereas the new area is called the New Capital Area. The Patna Secretariat with its imposing clock tower and the Patna High Court are two imposing landmarks of this era of development. Credit for designing the massive and majestic buildings of colonial Patna goes to the architect, I. F. Munnings. By 1916–1917, most of the buildings were ready for occupation. These buildings reflect either Indo-Saracenic influence (like Patna Museum and the state Assembly), or overt Renaissance influence like the Raj Bhawan and the High Court. Some buildings, like the General Post Office (GPO) and the Old Secretariat, bear pseudo-Renaissance influence. Some say the experience gained in building the new capital area of Patna proved very useful in building the imperial capital of New Delhi.

The British built several educational institutions in Patna like Patna College, Patna Science College, Bihar College of Engineering, Prince of Wales Medical College and the Bihar Veterinary College. With government patronage, the Biharis quickly seized the opportunity to make these centres flourish quickly and attain renown. In 1935, certain portions of Bihar were reorganised into the separate province of Orissa. Patna continued as the capital of Bihar province under the British Raj.

=== Independence movement ===
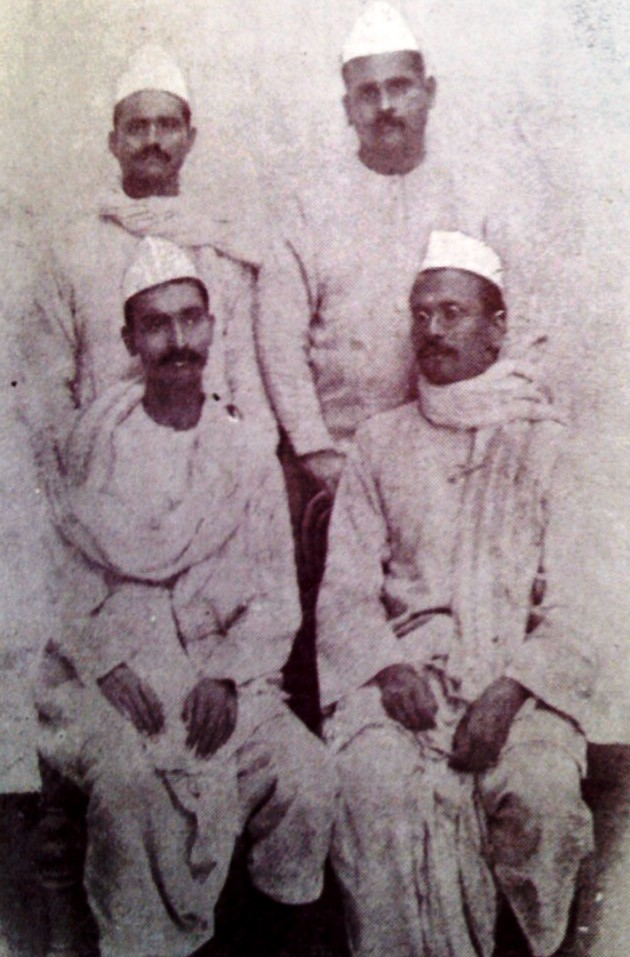
(Sitting L to R) Deshratna Dr.Rajendra Prasad and Bihar Vibhuti Anugrah Narayan Sinha during Mahatma Gandhi's 1917 Champaran Satyagraha

Bihar played a major role in the Indian independence struggle. Most notable were the Champaran movement against the Indigo plantation and the Quit India Movement of 1942. Leaders like Chandradeo Prasad Verma, Ajit Kumar Mehta, Swami Sahajanand Saraswati, Shaheed Baikuntha Shukla, Sri Krishna Sinha, Anugrah Narayan Sinha, Mulana Mazharul Haque, Loknayak Jayaprakash Narayan, Basawon Singh (Sinha), Yogendra Shukla, Sheel Bhadra Yajee, Pandit Yamuna Karjee, Dr. Maghfoor Ahmad Ajazi and many others who worked for India's independence and worked to lift up the underprivileged masses. Khudiram Bose, Upendra Narayan Jha "Azad" and Prafulla Chaki were also active in revolutionary movement in Bihar.

After his return from South Africa, it was from Bihar that Mahatma Gandhi launched his pioneering civil-disobedience movement, Champaran Satyagraha. Raj Kumar Shukla drew Mahatma Gandhi's attention to the exploitation of the peasants by the European indigo planters. Champaran Satyagraha received the spontaneous support from many Biharis, including Brajkishore Prasad, Rajendra Prasad (who became the first President of India) and Anugrah Narayan Sinha (who became the first Deputy Chief Minister and Finance Minister of Bihar).

In India's struggle for independence, the Champaran Satyagraha marks a very important stage. Raj Kumar Shukla drew the attention of Mahatma Gandhi, who had just returned from South Africa, to the plight of the peasants suffering under an oppressive system established by European indigo planters. Besides other excesses, they were forced to cultivate indigo on 3/20 part of their holding and sell it to the planters at prices fixed by the planters. This marked Gandhi's entry into India's independence movement. On arrival at the district headquarters in Motihari, Gandhi and his team of lawyers—Dr. Rajendra Prasad, Dr. Anugrah Narayan Sinha, Brajkishore Prasad and Ram Navami Prasad, whom he had handpicked to participate in the satyagraha—were ordered to leave by the next available train. They refused to do this, and Gandhi was arrested. He was released and the ban order was withdrawn in the face of a "Satyagraha" threat. Gandhi conducted an open inquiry into the peasant's grievances. The Government had to appoint an inquiry committee with Gandhi as a member. This led to the abolition of the system.

Raj Kumar Shukla has been described by Gandhi in his Atmakatha, as a man whose suffering gave him the strength to rise against the odds. In his letter to Gandhi he wrote "Respected Mahatma, You hear the stories of others everyday. Today please listen to my story.... I want to draw your attention to the promise made by you in the Lucknow Congress that you would come to Champaran. The time has come for you to fulfill your promise. 1.9 million suffering people of Champaran are waiting to see you."

Gandhi reached Patna on 10 April 1917 and on 16 April he reached Motihari accompanied by Raj Kumar Shukla. Under Gandhi's leadership the historic "Champaran Satyagraha" began. The contribution of Raj Kumar Shukla is reflected in the writings of Dr. Rajendra Prasad, the first President of India, Anugrah Narayan Sinha, Acharya Kriplani and Mahatma Gandhi. Raj Kumar Shukla maintained a diary in which he gave an account of his struggle against the atrocities of the indigo planters, atrocities so movingly depicted by Dinabandhu Mitra in Nil Darpan, a play that was translated by Michael Madhusudan Dutt. This movement by Mahatma Gandhi received the spontaneous support of a cross-section of people, including Dr. Rajendra Prasad, Bihar Kesari Sri Krishna Sinha, Dr. Anugrah Narayan Sinha and Brajkishore Prasad.

Shaheed Baikuntha Shukla was another nationalist from Bihar, who was hanged for murdering a government approver named Phanindrananth Ghosh. This led to the hanging of Bhagat Singh, Sukhdev and Rajguru. Phanindranath Ghosh hitherto a key member of the Revolutionary Party had betrayed the cause by turning an approver and giving evidence, which led to his murder. Baikunth was commissioned to plan the murder of Ghosh. He carried out the killing successfully on 9 November 1932. He was arrested, tried, and convicted, and, on 14 May 1934, he was hanged in Gaya Central Jail. Karpoori Thakur also played an important role in the freedom struggle.

In North and Central Bihar, a peasant movement was an important side effect of the independence movement. The Kisan Sabha movement started in Bihar under the leadership of Swami Sahajanand Saraswati who in 1929 had formed the Bihar Provincial Kisan Sabha (BPKS) to mobilise peasant grievances against the zamindari attacks their occupancy rights. Gradually the peasant movement intensified and spread across the rest of India. All these radical developments on the peasant front culminated in the formation of the All India Kisan Sabha (AIKS) at the Lucknow session of the Indian National Congress in April 1936, with Swami Sahajanand Saraswati elected as its first President. This movement aimed at overthrowing the feudal zamindari system instituted by the British. It was led by Swami Sahajanand Saraswati and his followers Pandit Yamuna Karjee, Rahul Sankrityayan and others. Pandit Yamuna Karjee along with Rahul Sankrityayan and other Hindi literary figures started publishing a Hindi weekly Hunkar from Bihar in 1940. Hunkar later became the mouthpiece of the peasant movement and the agrarian movement in Bihar and was instrumental in spreading the movement. The peasant movement later spread to other parts of the country and helped in digging out the British roots in the Indian society by overthrowing the zamindari system.

During the Quit India movement, in Saran district of Bihar, Chandrama Mahto received bullet injuries during a protest against the colonial authorities and was subsequently martyred on the same day. In Shahabad district, Maharaj Koeri was wounded in police firing at Behea. Ramjas Koeri was arrested, and taken into confinement, he died in prison, presumably due to brutal assault by Police. Noted revolutionary Chandradeo Prasad Verma was also arrested during Quit India movement, he underwent rigorous imprisonment for two years from 1943 to 1945. After his release from imprisonment, he restarted revolutionary activities once again and plotted a conspiracy to blast Bikram Airport in Patna. In Khagaria district, Prabhu Narayan was shot by the colonial police white attempting to unfurl Indian flag during Quit India movement.

Towards the end of 1946, between 30 October and 7 November, a massacre of Muslims in Bihar made Partition more likely. Begun as a reprisal for the Noakhali riot, it was difficult for authorities to deal with because it was spread out over a large number of scattered villages, and the number of casualties was impossible to establish accurately: "According to a subsequent statement in the British Parliament, the death-toll amounted to 5,000. The Statesman's estimate was between 7,500 and 10,000; the Congress party admitted to 2,000; Mr. Jinnah claimed about 30,000."

The first Cabinet of Bihar was formed on 2 April 1946, consisting of two members, Dr. Sri Krishna Sinha as the first Chief Minister of Bihar and Dr. Anugrah Narayan Sinha as Deputy Chief Minister and Finance Minister of Bihar (also in charge of Labour, Health, Agriculture and Irrigation). Other ministers were inducted later. The Cabinet served as the first Bihar Government after independence in 1947. In 1950, Dr. Rajendra Prasad from Bihar became the first President of India.

== Post-Independence (1947–1990) ==
The Indian National Congress dominated the state for much of the decades after independence except for a brief period in the 1960s and 70s when some of the backward caste leaders were successful in forming a non-Congress government in the state. Satish Prasad Singh was the first OBC chief minister of the state for a very brief period, who succeeded Mahamaya Prasad Sinha. In the later period, the upper-caste remained active in politics but the backward caste were gradually becoming vocal in political space. The lead was taken by Upper Backward Castes, who were the biggest beneficiaries of the land reform drive undertaken in the early decades of independence and were now becoming active in the politics of the state. A section of these upper-backwards also emulated the practices of erstwhile Zamindars and committed atrocities against the Dalits. The Naxalite uprising in the state also forced the upper caste to sell off their most vulnerable holdings, which were most often bought by the peasants of these upper backward communities. The naxal uprising in the state led to foundation of several caste-based private armies which perpetrated massacres of lower caste people on the charge of being the supporters of the Naxalites. Ranvir Sena, Bhumi Sena and Kuer Sena were some of the most dreaded caste armies. The Bhojpur region remained the hotspot of the Naxalite movement in the Bihar, where Master Jagdish lead the uprising against the landlords. Some of the biggest massacres took place during this period in which both upper-caste and the Dalits remained the victims. The Upper Backward Castes were in two front confrontations with both the Dalits as well as upper castes.

The caste wars coincided with the rise of backward caste politics against upper-caste domination in Bihar and throughout North India after the implementation of the Mandal Commission report. The most numerous and powerful backward community were the Yadavs, and the 1990s saw the rise of the Rashtriya Janata Dal (RJD) led by Lalu Prasad Yadav. This party held the Yadav/Muslim vote bank, a combination also held by the Samajwadi party, its UP counterpart. This allowed the RJD to sweep to power throughout the 1990s. His platform was one of social justice, increasing reservations for lower castes. However critics of the era have claimed it was a 'Jungle raj.'

== Contemporary period ==
=== Lalu Prasad Yadav (1990–2005) ===
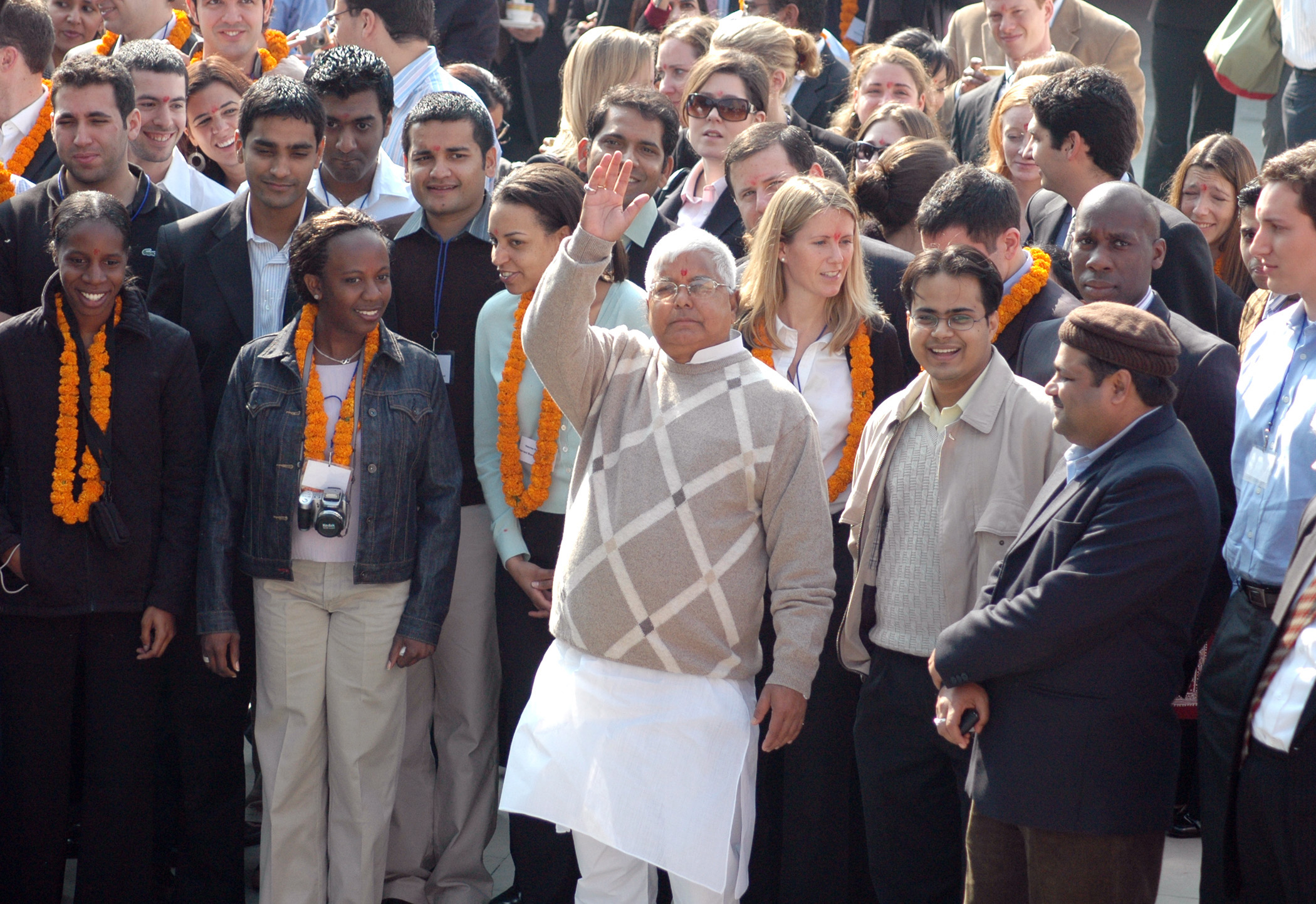
Lalu Prasad Yadav with the students of Harvard and Wharton Schools, in New Delhi on 27 December 2006.

In 1989, in the 9th General election to the Lok Sabha, the Janata Dal emerged as a serious challenge to the Indian National Congress party at the central level. The rise of Janata Dal also affected the state politics of Bihar which was dominated by the upper castes for long who were controlling the Congress firmly in the state, a charge disputed by some scholars. The Janata Dal was composed of three different wings which drew its strength from different classes of society. The first wing was under the leadership of Chandra Shekhar, who had reached out to the other Socialists and also to one splinter group under Morarji Desai. The second faction consisted of some of the old congressmen including Arun Nehru and former Defence Minister Vishwanath Pratap Singh. The third group drew its support from backward castes and middle peasantry, led by Charan Singh. Although Charan Singh was the leader of this faction, the actual leadership emerged after his death under the new generation of politicians like Lalu Prasad Yadav, who was a product of student politics of the 1970s.

Yadav was appointed as the first OBC president of the Patna University student union in 1967. In 1974, he was appointed as the head of the Bihar student agitation committee which led the protest against the Congress-led government of the state during the Bihar Movement under the mentorship of Jay Prakash Narayan. According to Seyed Hossein Zarhani, throughout his leadership period at Patna University, his image was of a popular backward caste leader who fought against upper-caste dominance.

In 1975, as an activist in the campaign against Indira Gandhi, he was arrested and after the end of National Emergency, he was elected as Member of Parliament in 1977 from Chhapra constituency on the ticket of Janata Party. In the 1980 and 1989 state assembly elections, Yadav was elected as Member of Legislative Assembly from Sonepur. He was the successor of Karpoori Thakur as the leader of opposition in Bihar Legislative Assembly who finally assumed the post of Chief Minister in 1990. Yadav's appointment as Chief Minister changed the socio-political profile of the state and in the coming years he emerged as the undisputed leader in Bihar who controlled the politics of the state earlier himself and later through his wife, Rabri Devi.

Yadav followed the footsteps of his predecessors and Janta Dal under him indicated that it is the only party which is prepared to keep the backwards at the centre of the administration. Hence after assuming power, Lalu Yadav's government transferred 12 out of 13 Divisional Commissioners and 250 out of 324 Returning Officers in order to keep lower-caste people at the helm of all affairs at the local level. Many OBC bureaucrats were brought to the main departments from the sidelines and were given key positions such as the strategic posts of District Magistrates and Deputy Divisional Commissioners to the extent that they became least equivalent to the upper-castes. Three years after Yadav assumed power, many upper-caste officials attained transfer to the centre to avoid the alleged humiliation and ill-treatment they suffered in Bihar. The Panchayati Raj Bill and the Patna University and Bihar University amendment bill passed by the state legislature in 1993 also paved the way for the entry of Scheduled Castes, Scheduled Tribes and OBCs in the state services in bulk. According to Christophe Jaffrelot:

Lalu Prasad Yadav has deliberately introduced a new style of politics, highlighting the rustic qualities of low castes of Bihar. For instance, he makes the point of speaking the Bhojpuri dialect or English with a strong Bhojpuri accent, to the horror of the upper classes. He was also adept at confronting them. One of his early slogans was, Bhurabal Hatao, (wipe out Bhumihar, Brahmin, Rajput and Lala (Kayasth)). A few months after he became Chief Minister, he utilised his control of state media to describe the opposition to the Mandal as the conspiracy of the upper castes.

=== Rise of Nitish Kumar (Post 1997) ===
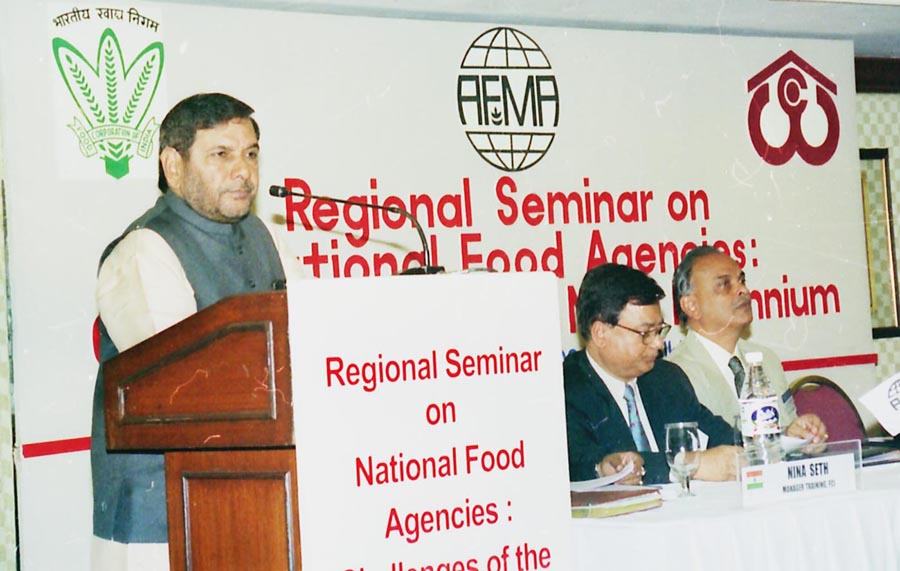
Former Union Minister for Consumer Affairs, Food and Public Distribution Shri Sharad Yadav delivering his inaugural speech at Regional Seminar on National Food Agencies "Challenges of the New Millennium" in New Delhi

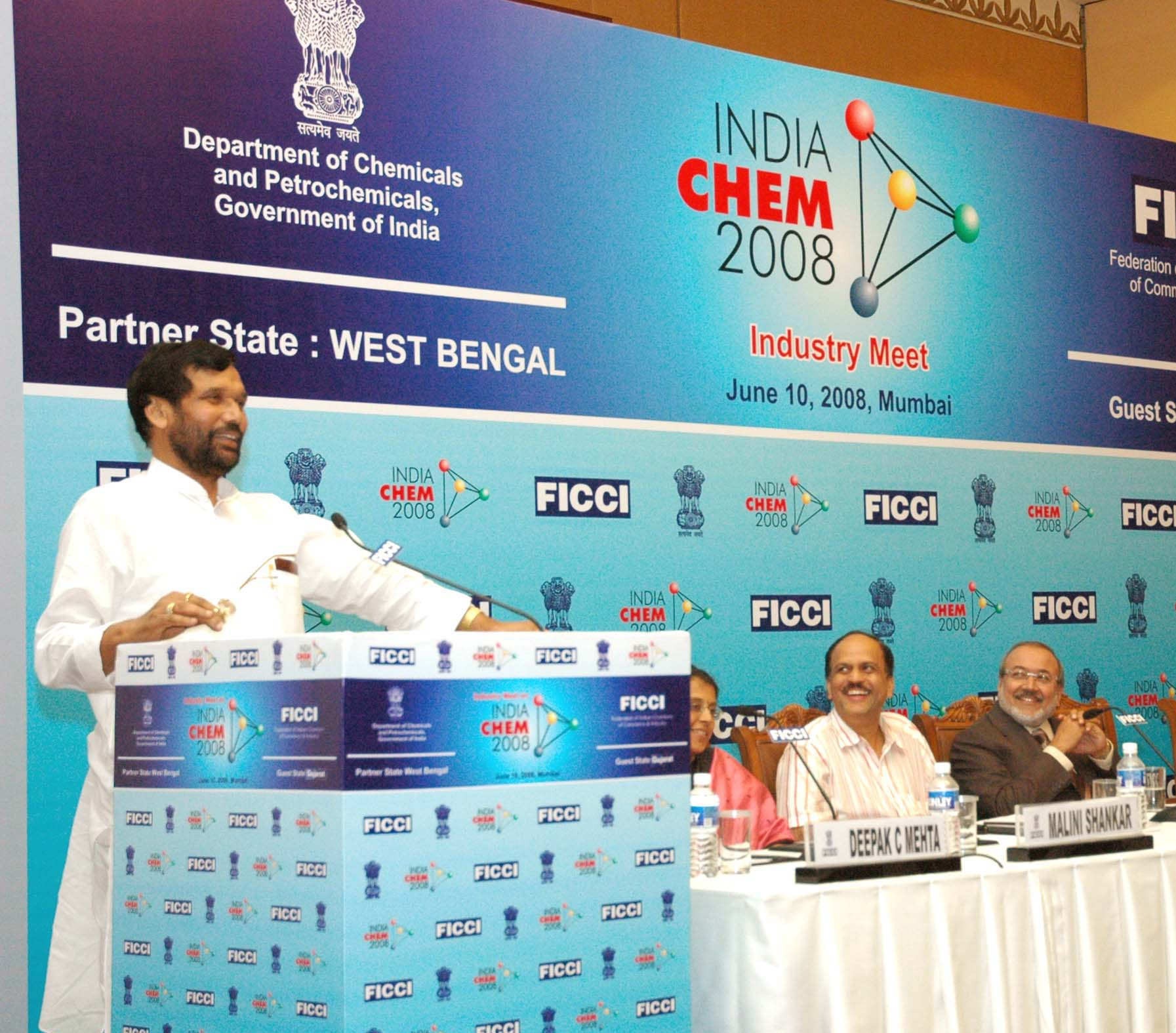
Ram Vilas Paswan as the Union Minister of Chemicals & Fertilizers and Steel, addressing at "India Chem 2008" Industry meet in Mumbai on 10 June 2008.

"Ram Vilas Paswan was often seen with Mont Blanc pen, Cartier glasses and Rado prompting his critics to brand him a ‘five-star Dalit’. But in his pockets of influence in Bihar, his whirling helicopter was enough to make people chant, “Dharti Gunje Aasman, Ram Vilas Paswan.” Paswan was among the most popular faces when the social churn began in post-Emergency Bihar. In 1983, he formed the Dalit Sena, on the lines of the Schedule Caste Federation of BR Ambedkar."

— From, Remembering Ram Vilas Paswan: The champion of Dalit politics in Bihar by The Economic Times

The Janata Dal had survived the splits in past when leaders like George Fernandes and Nitish Kumar defected to form Samata Party in 1994, but it remained a baseless party after the decision of Yadav to form Rashtriya Janata Dal (RJD) in 1997. The second split took place before the Rabri Devi assuming power which resulted in Janata Dal having only two leaders of any consequence in it, namely Sharad Yadav and Ram Vilas Paswan. Paswan was regarded as the rising leader of Dalits and had the credit of winning his elections with unprecedented margins. His popularity reached the national level when he was awarded the post of Minister of Railways in the United Front government in 1996 and was subsequently made the leader of Lok Sabha. His outreach was witnessed in the western Uttar Pradesh too, when his followers organised an impressive rally at the behest of a newly floated organisation called Dalit Panthers. Sharad Yadav was also a veteran socialist leader but without any massive support base. In the 1998 Parliamentary elections, the Samata Party and Janata Dal, which was in a much weaker position after the formation of RJD ended up eating each other's vote base. This made Nitish Kumar merge both the parties to form Janata Dal (United).

In 1999 Lok Sabha elections, Rashtriya Janata Dal received a setback at the hand of BJP+JD(U) combine. The new coalition emerged leading in 199 out of 324 assembly constituencies and it was widely believed that in the forthcoming election to Bihar state assembly elections, the Lalu-Rabri rule will come to an end. The RJD had fought the election in an alliance with the Congress but the coalition didn't work making state leadership of Congress believe that the maligned image of Lalu Prasad after his name was drawn in the Fodder Scam had eroded his support base. Consequently, the Congress decided to fight the 2000 assembly elections alone. The RJD had to be satiated with the communist parties as the coalition partners but the seat-sharing conundrum in the camp of NDA made Nitish Kumar pull his Samta Party out of the Sharad Yadav and Ram Vilas Paswan faction of the Janata Dal. Differences also arose between the BJP and Nitish Kumar who later wanted to be projected as the Chief Minister of Bihar but the former was not in favour. Even Paswan also wanted to be a CM face. The Muslims and OBCs were too divided in their opinion. A section of Muslims, which included the poor communities like Pasmanda were of the view that Lalu only strengthened upper Muslims like Shaikh, Sayyid and Pathans and they were in search of new options.

Yadav also alienated other dominant backward castes like Koeri and Kurmi since his projection as the saviour of Muslims. It is argued by Sanjay Kumar that the belief that, "the dominant OBCs like the twin caste of Koeri-Kurmi will ask for share in power if he (Yadav) seeks their support while the Muslims will remain satisfied with the protection during communal riots only" made Yadav neglect them. Moreover, the divisions in both camps made the political atmosphere in the state a charged one in which many parties were fighting against each other with no visible frontiers. JD(U) and BJP were fighting against each other on some of the seats and so was the Samta Party. The result was a setback for the BJP, which in media campaigns was emerging with a massive victory. RJD emerged as the single largest party and with the political maneuvere of Lalu Yadav, Rabri Devi was sworn in as the Chief Minister again. The media largely failed to gauge the ground-level polarisation in Bihar. According to Sanjay Kumar:

there can be no doubt about one thing that the upper-caste media was always anti Lalu and it was either not aware of the ground level polarisation in the Bihar, or deliberately ignored it. If the election result did not appear as a setback for RJD, it was largely because of the bleak picture painted by the media. Against this background, RJD's defeat had appeared like a victory.

Even after serving imprisonment in connection with the 1997 scam, Lalu seemed to relish his role as a lower-caste jester. He argued that corruption charges against him and his family were the conspiracy of the upper-caste bureaucracy and media elites threatened by the rise of peasant cultivator castes. In 2004, Lalu's RJD had outperformed other state-based parties by winning 26 Lok Sabha seats in Bihar. He was awarded the post of Union Railway minister but the rising aspirations of the extremely backward castes unleashed by him resulted in JD(U) and BJP-led coalition to defeat his party in 2005 Bihar Assembly elections. Consequently, Nitish Kumar a leader of OBC Kurmi caste was sworn in as the chief minister. During Lalu's time backward caste candidates came to dominate the Bihar assembly claiming half of the seats in it and it was the aspiration of this powerful social community which led to friction among the united backwards, leading to the rise of Nitish Kumar who made both social justice and development as his political theme.

=== Nitish Kumar (2005 onwards) ===
Thus, the 2005 Bihar assembly elections ended the 15 years of continuous RJD rule in the state, giving way to NDA led by Nitish Kumar. Bihari migrant workers have faced violence and prejudice in many parts of India, like Maharashtra, Punjab and Assam.

To mark the separation of Bihar from Bengal on 22 March 1912, the completion of 100 years of existence is being celebrated in the name of Bihar Shatabadi Celebration Utsav. There was a political crisis over post of the chief minister during February 2015.

== Gallery ==
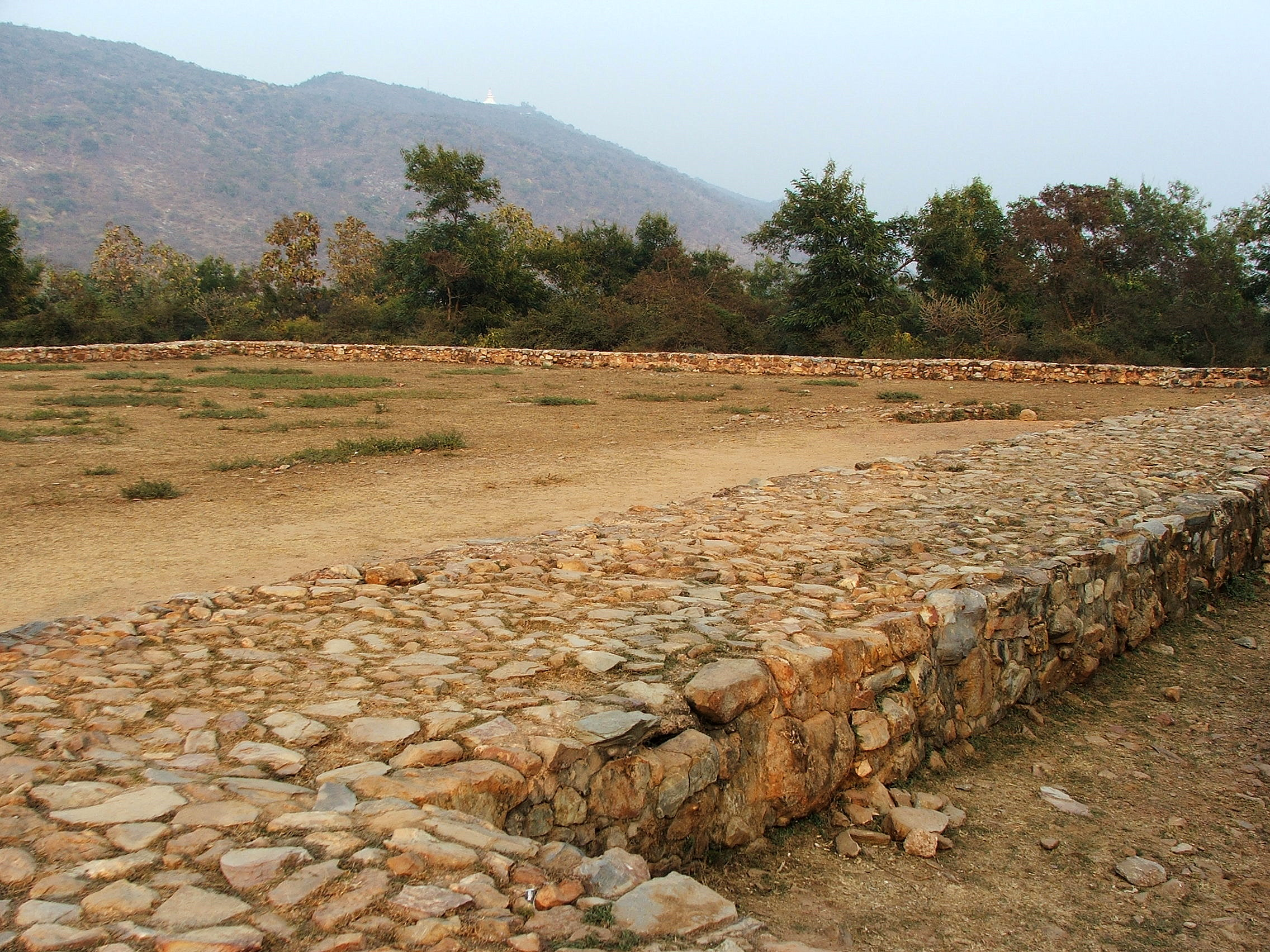
Bimbisara's jail, where King Bimbisara was imprisoned by his son Ajatashatru, in Rajgir.

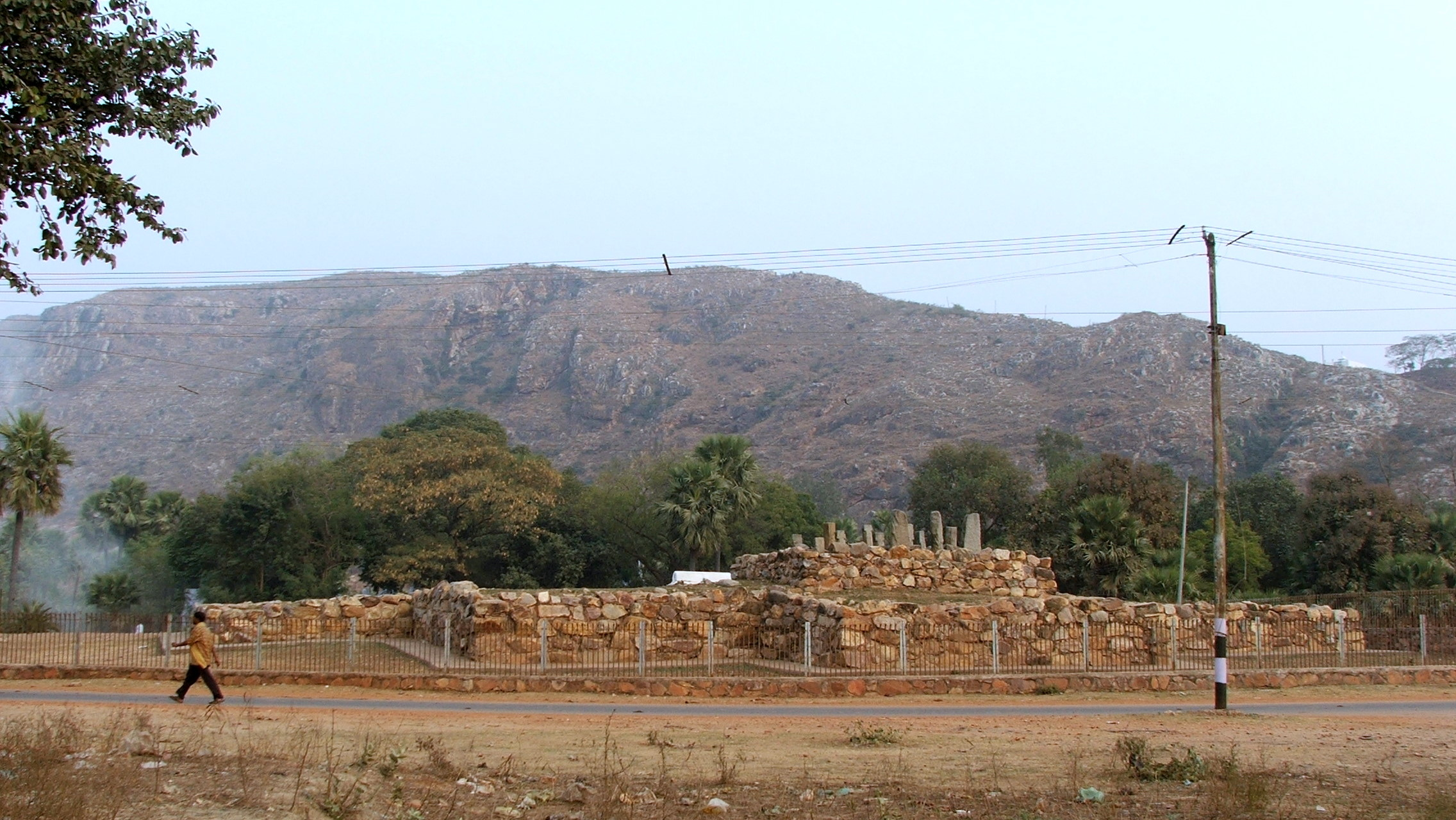
Ajatashatru's stupa in Rajgir, where his ashes were interred.
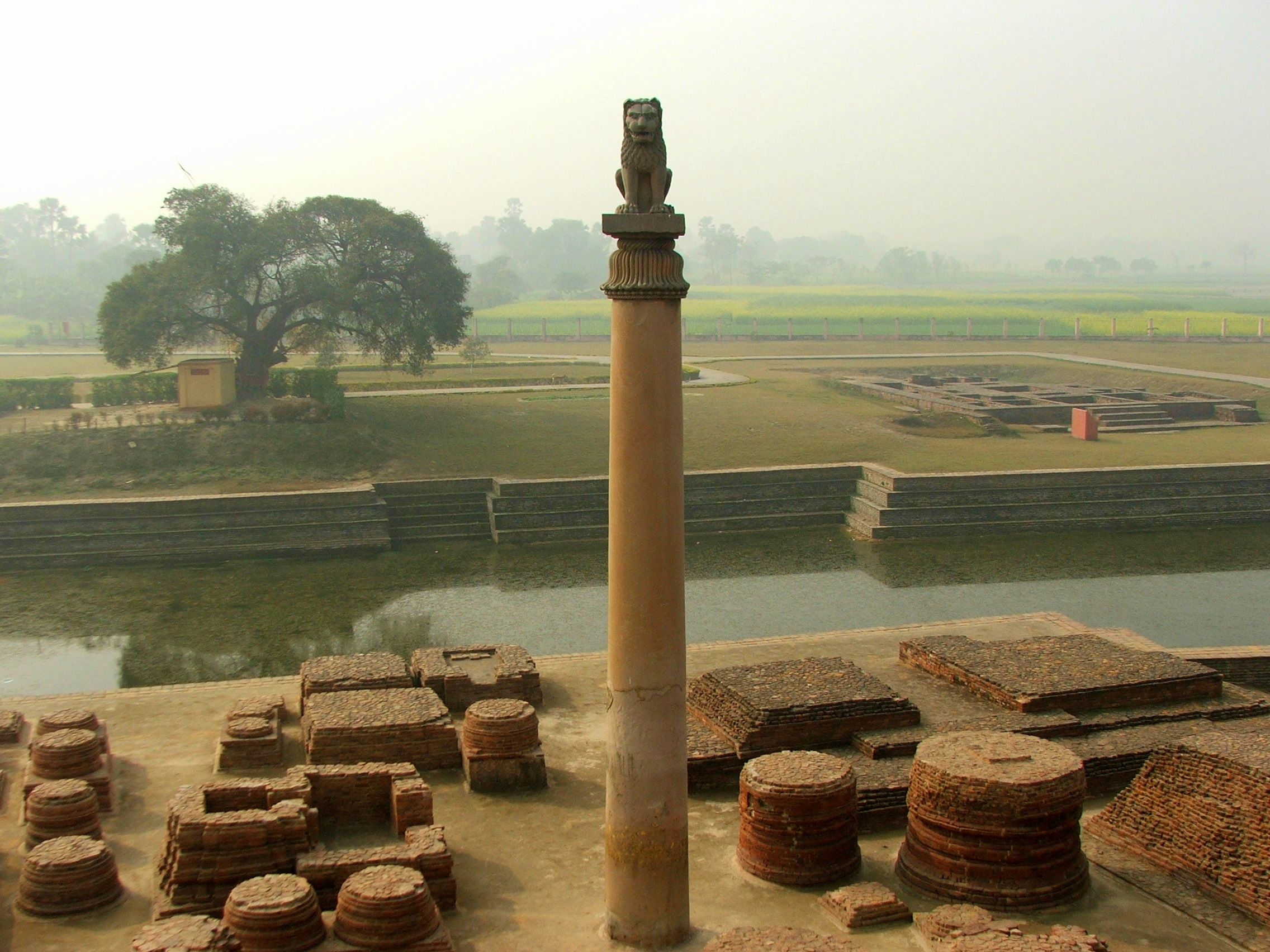
Vaishali was the capital of Vajjika League, believed to be the world's earliest republic.

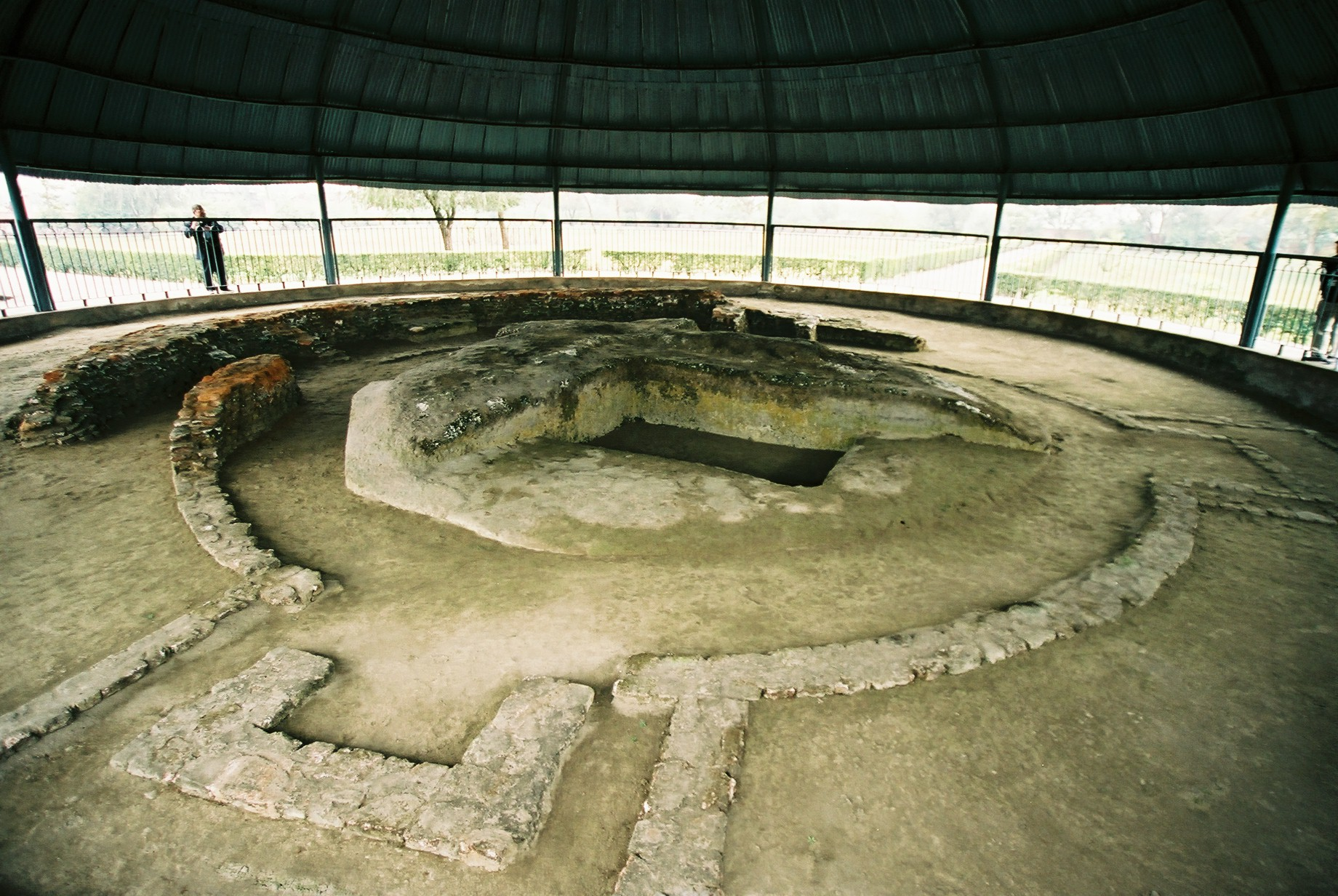
The Relic Stupa of Vaishali, dated to the 5th century BCE.
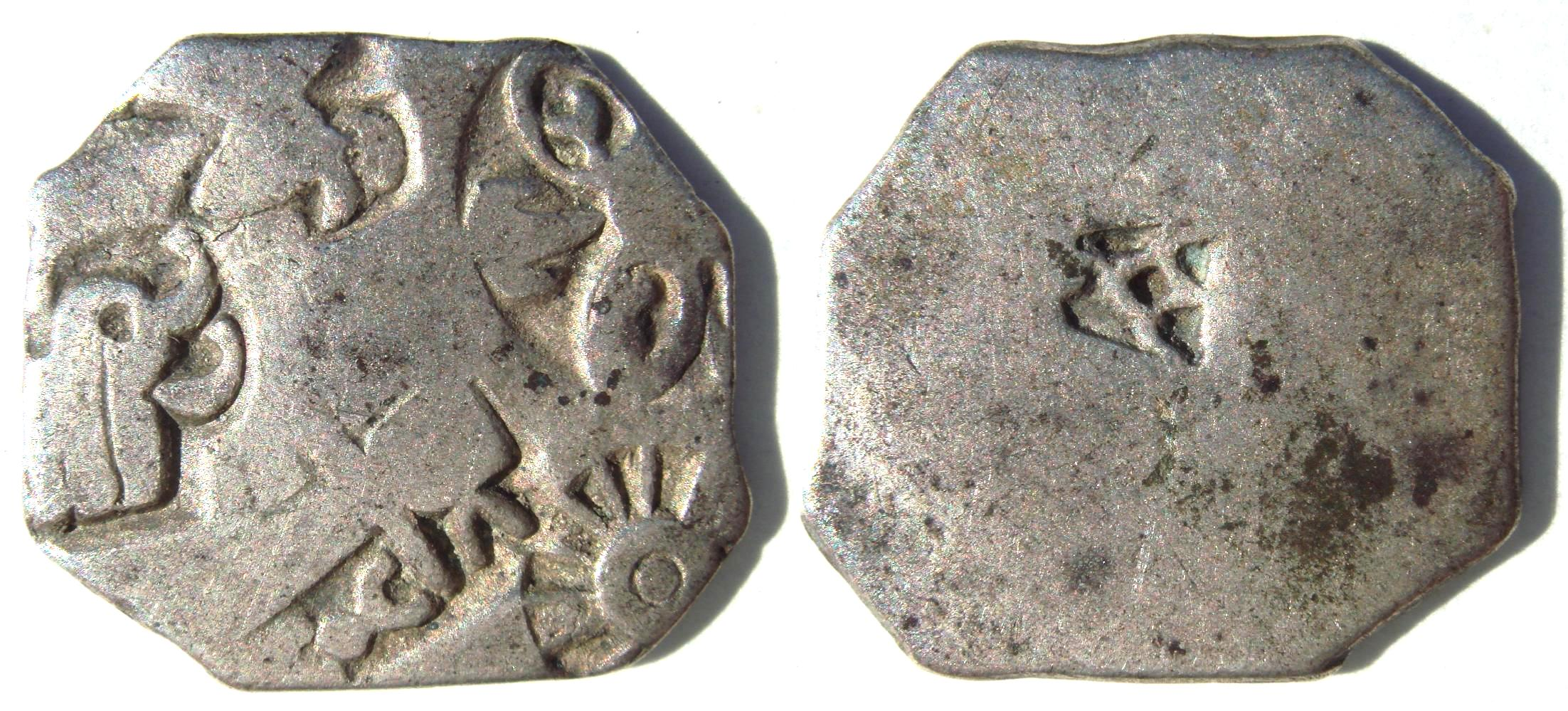
Silver punch-mark coin of the Maurya Empire, with symbols of a wheel and an elephant. 3rd century BC.

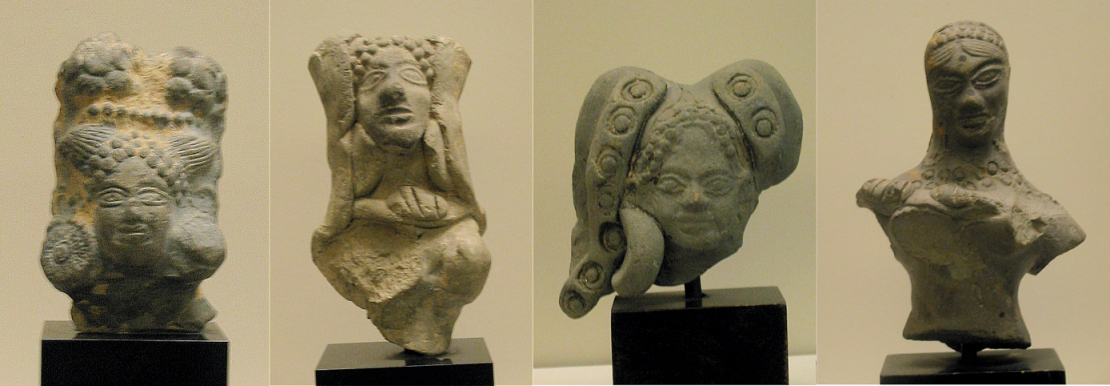
Mauryan sculptures.

== See also ==
- History of India
- History of Bengal
- History of Tamil Nadu
- Political history of medieval Karnataka
