= Padri Ki Haveli =

Visitation of the blessed Virgin Mary

Religion
- Affiliation: Roman Catholic
- Diocese: Patna district
- Province: Bihar
- Region: Magadh
- Ecclesiastical or organisational status: Cathedral
- Leadership: Dr. Victor Alphonse (General Secretary, Parish Council).

Location
- Location: Patna
- Municipality: Patna Municipal Corporation
- State: India
- Interactive map of Visitation of the blessed Virgin Mary
- Coordinates: 25.611°N 85.144°E

Architecture
- Architect: Tirreto
- Type: Cathedral
- Style: Neoclassical
- Completed: First build – 1713; Major redisgn – 1772
- Construction cost: {INR}700 in 1772

Padri-Ki-Haveli ("Mansion of Padre"), also known as the Visitation of the blessed Virgin Mary, is the oldest church in Bihar. When Roman Catholics arrived in Bihar, they built a small church in 1713 at a place now known as Padri-ki-Haveli.

The current church was re-designed by a Venetian architect Tirreto in 1772. He came from Kolkata to design the church. The foundation stone of this church has a dimension of 70 feet of length, 40 feet of width and 50 feet of height.

Nawab Mir Qasim destroyed the church because of the quarrel with the British traders on 25 June 1763. Ancient records were destroyed and burnt consequently. In 1857, during the Great Indian Rebellion, the church was very damaged again.

Today, the monument stands as an architectural wonder with intricate details present in few churches in India.

== Notes ==
- The main attraction of the church is the large cathedral bell.
- Mother Teresa got her training in this church.
