= Painting in Bihar =

Bihar is a state in eastern India divided by the Ganges river, an area which was once an important center for culture and learning. A Neolithic settlement has been discovered at Chirand which contains rock paintings similar to those found in Spain's Altamira and France's Lascaux regions. The tradition of painting has been handed down from generation to generation in the families of the Mithila and Bhojpur regions mainly by women. Painting was usually done on walls during festivals, religious events, and other milestones of the life cycle, like birth, Upanayanam (the sacred thread ceremony), and marriage. Other styles of this region include Tikuli, Manjusha, and Patna kalam.

== History ==
=== Prehistoric and Early ===
Prehistoric rock paintings have been discovered in the Kaimur hills, Nawada and Jamui. A Neolithic settlement was also discovered in the thick of the alluvium, over the bank of the Ganges at Chirand. The rock paintings depict prehistoric lifestyle and natural environment. The paintings display the sun, moon, stars, animals, plants, trees, rivers and are believed to represent love towards nature. The paintings also highlight daily life of the early humans in Bihar, displaying hunting, running, dancing, and walking. The rock paintings in Bihar are not only identical to those in central and southern India, but also are similar to those in Europe and Africa. The rock paintings of Spain's Altamira and France's Lascaux are almost identical to those found in Bihar.

=== Mauryan Era ===
While it can be assured that there was Mauryan proficiency in painting based on the descriptions of Megasthenes, unfortunately no proper representative has been found to date. Many centuries later, the paintings of the Ajanta Caves, the oldest significant body of Indian painting, show that there was a well-developed tradition, which may well stretch back to Mauryan times.

=== 17th to mid-20th ===
Those who practiced this art form were the descendants of the Hindu artisans and painters. Facing Ban and persecution from the Mughal Emperor, Aurangzeb, these artisans found refuge, via Murshidabad, in Patna during the late 18th century. Patna Qalaam was an offshoot of the well-known India's miniature painting but unlike Mughal painting, which focused on the royalty and court scenes, flag bearers of Patna Qalaam were deeply influenced by the daily life of common man. Patna Qalaam flourished in Bihar during the early 18th to mid-20th centuries. In Patna they came under patronage of local Rajas, Zamindras, aristocracy and often Indophile scions of the early East India and started a unique form of painting which came to be known as the Company painting, or Patna School of Painting. Patna School of Painting shared the characteristics of the Bihar painters, but whereas the Mughal style depicted only royalty and court scenes, the Patna artists used painting to display the common man's daily life, livelihood, rituals, pujas, bazaar scenes. They used the watercolours on paper and on mica. The style's subject matter evolved to include scenes of Indian daily life, local rulers, festivals, and ceremonies. This school of painting formed the basis for the formation of the College of Arts and Crafts, Patna under the leadership of Shri Radha Mohan.

== Vernacular ==
=== Mithila Painting ===
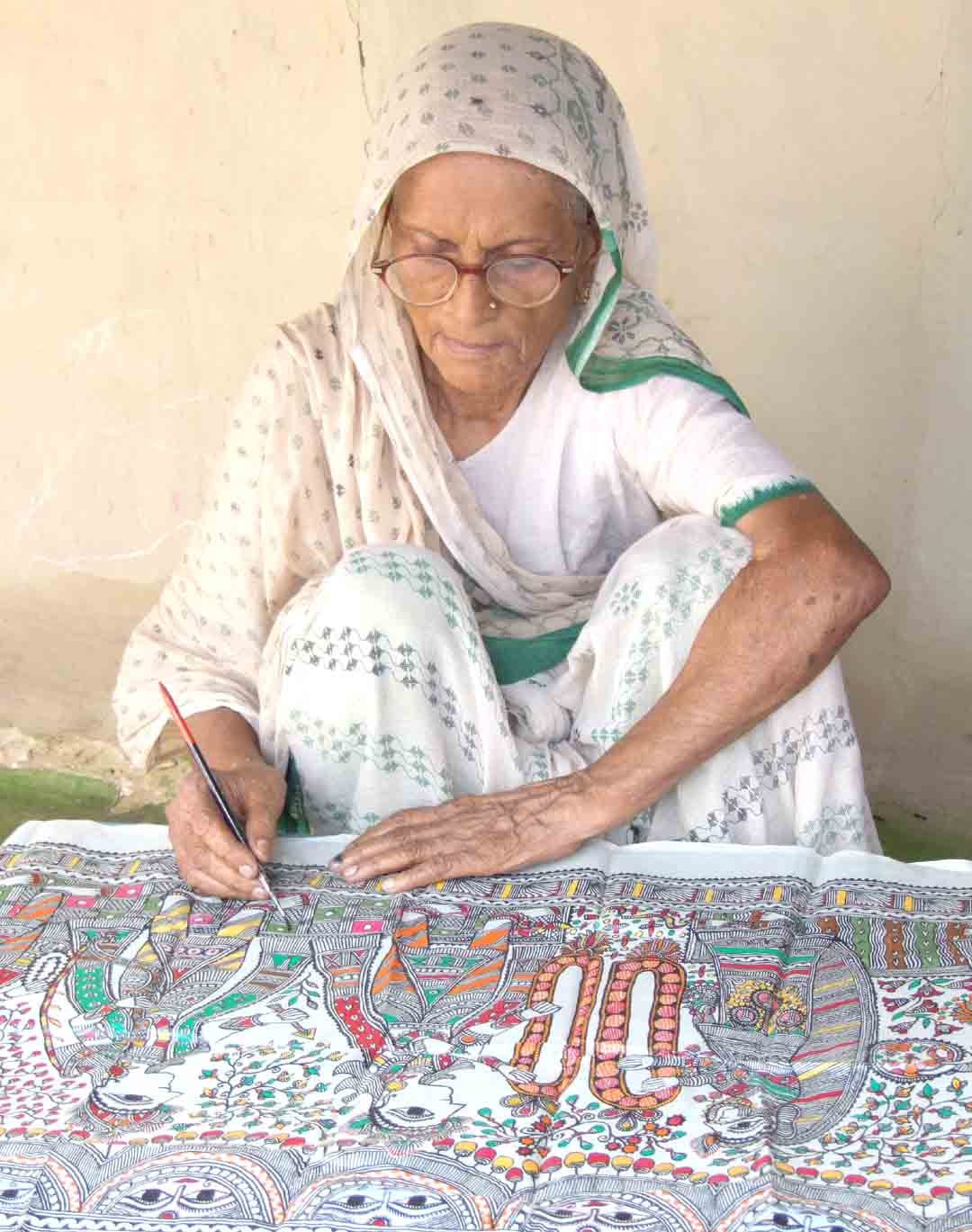
Artist doing Mithila painting

One is Mithila painting, a style of Indian painting used in the Mithila region of Bihar. Traditionally, painting was one of the skills that was passed down from generation to generation in the families of the Mithila region, mainly by women. Painting was usually done on walls during festivals, religious events, and other milestones of the life cycle, like birth, Upanayanam (the sacred thread ceremony), and marriage. Mithila painting was traditionally done on huts' freshly plastered mud walls, but today it is also done on cloth, handmade paper, and canvas. Famous Mithila painters have included Smt Bharti Dayal, Mahasundari Devi, the late Ganga Devi, and Sita Devi. Mithila painting is also called Madhubani art. It mostly depicts human beings and their association with nature. Common scenes illustrate deities like Krishna, Ram, Shiva, Durga, Lakshmi, and Saraswati from ancient epics. Natural objects like the sun, moon, and religious plants like tulsi are also widely painted, along with scenes from the royal court and social events like weddings. Generally no space is left empty.

=== Bhojpuri Painting ===
Bhojpuri painting is a folk painting style that has flourished in the Bhojpuri region of Bihar thousands of years ago. This painting style is a type of wall painting primarily done on temple walls or on walls of the rooms of newly married couples and the main motifs are that of Lord Shiva and Goddess Parvati. Although in recent times motifs of natural objects and life and struggles of village people are also depicted to make the painting more acceptable among the common people and bring the style close to reality.

=== Tikuli Painting ===
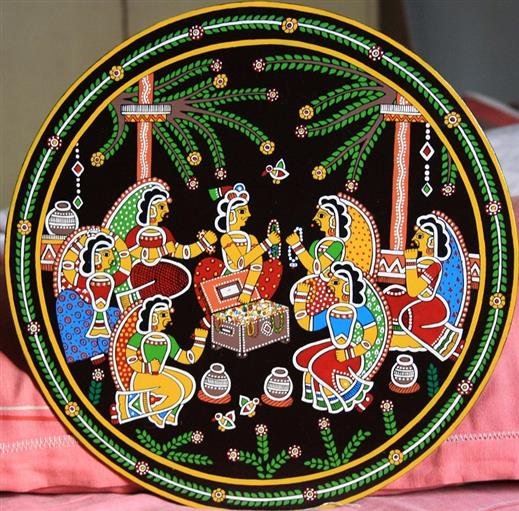
Tikuli painting by Ashok Kumar Biswas

This style involved the making of small Bindi like dots from thin glass sheets and adorned with gold and silver foils. In modern times, it has been extended to other decorative items. Tikuli is a type of hand painting and its history spread over 800 years. The painting with its modern evolution and varied manifestations, find its origin in Patna, Bihar.

Tikuli art has a deep historical significance associated with it. Tikuli is the term that is locally used for bindis, which are essentially colorful dots that women wear as accessories between their eyebrows. The basic raw materials used in Tikuli craft is the MDF board and the colors. This is a unique product handcrafted by artisans. This crafts provide livelihood support to about 300-500 artisans families on regular basis in Digha, Danapur and Gai Ghat mahallas of Patna town of Bihar.

=== Manjusha Painting ===
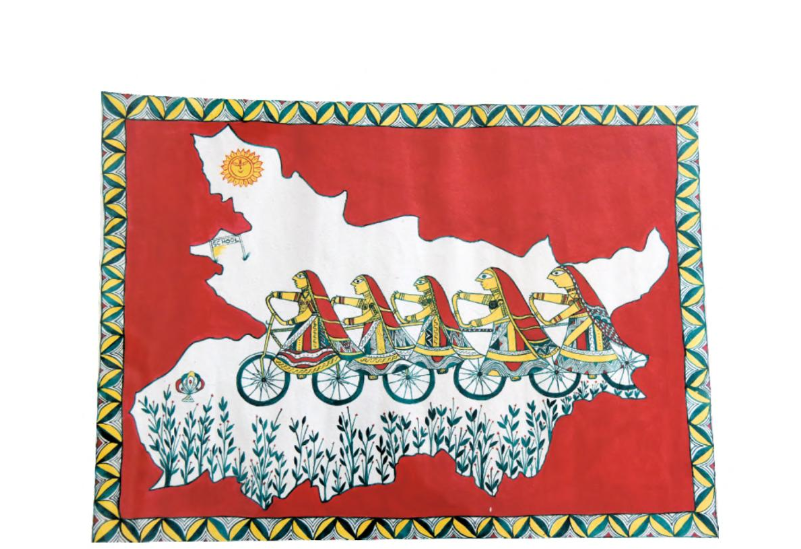
Manjusha Painting

Manjusha painting, a thick line is used and the hair is shown not with lines but with colors. There is a tradition of showing the five sisters of the poisonous together in a snake-form. Where the character has to show domination, the hair is kept open. The pictures depict Bihula with her open hairstyle and a portrait of Manjusha or Nag in front of it, while the drawing of Mansa depicts the nectar Kalash in the right hand of the goddess and the picture of Nag in the left hand. Embellishments are predominant in women's clothes. Pink, yellow and green colors are mainly used in painting. In some cases, the common auxiliary colors associated with these three colors, such as green and orange, are also used. Black color is used in the human shape to bring out the snake-venom. These colors have esoteric and symbolic meanings. The pink and yellow colors signify excitement and exuberance, while green is a symbol of gloom and growth. The traditional artist of Manjushapainting, Chakravarti Devi used natural colors. But now posters, water, oil and ‘acrylic color’ are being used.

=== Patna kalam ===
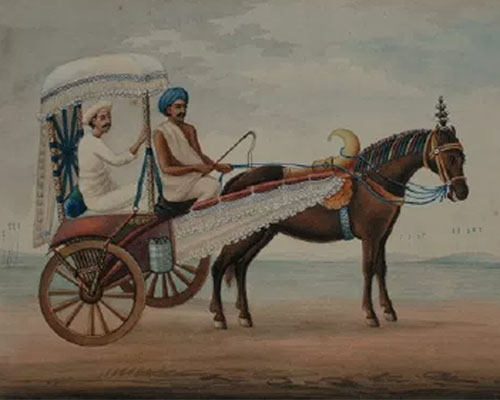
Tamtam (Horse-drawn carriage) – by Shiv Lal

Patna Kalam is regarded as an off-shoot of Mughal painting, with influences from Persian and Company (British) styles. The portraits can be clearly seen having colours and linings from Mughal style, and the shading can be seen to be adopted from the British style. Diverging from the Mughal and Persian style of wide and exquisitely decorated borders, Patna Kalam primarily focused on the subject of the painting. Their main subjects were common man, local festivals, ceremonies, bazaar scenes, local rulers, and domestic activities. The paintings were done on diverse surfaces such as paper, mica, and even ivory diskettes, that were used as brooches.

A distinguishing characteristic of Patna Kalam is lack of any landscape, foreground or background. Another characteristic was the development in the shading of solid forms. Patna Kalam paintings are painted straightway with the brush without marking with pencil to delineate the contours of the picture and the procedure of painting is popularly known as 'Kajli Seahi'.

== Artist ==
- Sh. Shyam Sharma
- Sh. Anil Bihari
- Sh. Vireshwar Bhattacharya

== Schools ==
College of Arts and Crafts, Patna - The School is an important center of fine arts (especially Patna Qualam) in Bihar.
