= Jagdishpur estate =

Principality

Jagdishpur Raj
- 1770–1858
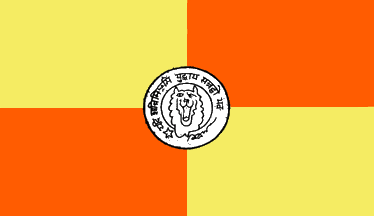
- Flag
- Status: Self-governing landownership under the Company rule
- Capital: Jagdishpur
- Common languages: Bhojpuri
- Religion: Hinduism
- Historical era: Early modern period
  - Established: 1770
  - Disestablished: 1858
Succeeded by
British Raj

Part of a series on the
History of Bihar
Ancient History
Prehistoric and Vedic Era

- Chirand (Neolithic) - Vedic period - Videha - Mithila (ancient) - Anga - Kikata

Urbanisation and Shramana

- Second Urbanisation - Rise of Shramana - Buddhism • Jainism • Ajivika

Gaṇasaṅghas

- Magadha - Vajjika League

  - Nāya
  - Vajji (tribe)
  - Licchavis of Vaishali

- Malla (tribe) - Kashi - Bulis

Imperial Magadha

- Brihadratha dynasty - Haryanka dynasty

  - Bimbisara
  - Ajatashatru

- Shishunaga dynasty - Nanda Empire

  - Mahapadma Nanda

- Maurya Empire

  - Chandragupta Maurya
  - Ashoka
Post-Mauryan and Smriti

- Shunga Empire

  - Pushyamitra Shunga

- Kanva dynasty - Development of Smriti - Brahmanical Revival

The Interregnum

- Kushan Influence - Mitra Dynasty - Resurgence of Licchavis

Classical and medieval
The Classical Age

- Gupta Empire

Early Medieval

- Later Gupta dynasty - Maukharis

Pala Era and Feudatories

- Pala Empire - Khayaravala dynasty - Pithipatis of Magadha

Medieval Mithila

- Karnats of Mithila - Oiniwar dynasty

Islamic Incursions

- Delhi Sultanate

Centers of Learning

- Nalanda - Vikramashila - Odantapuri - Telhara monastery

Early-modern
Afghan and Mughal Rule

- Sur Empire

  - Sher Shah Suri

- Mughal Empire

  - Bihar Subah
Regional Chieftaincies

- Chakwars - Chero dynasty - Gidhaur chieftaincy - Kharagpur Raj - Khokhra chieftaincy

Major Zamindari Estates

- Bettiah Raj - Khandavala dynasty - Dumraon Raj - Hathwa Raj - Jagdishpur estate

Colonial & Independence Era
Colonial Rule (1764–1947)

- Battle of Buxar (1764) - East India Company - Permanent Settlement (1793) - Santhal rebellion - Indian Rebellion of 1857

  - Kunwar Singh

- Bihar famine of 1873–74 - Bihar Province (Est. 1912) - 1934 Nepal–Bihar earthquake

Freedom Struggle

- Champaran Satyagraha (1917) - Salt Satyagraha - Bihar Vidyapeeth - Kisan Sabha

  - Swami Sahajanand Saraswati

- Quit India Movement

  - Azad Dasta
Modern Era (Post-1947)
Congress Era (1947–1967)

- Sri Krishna Sinha - Anugrah Narayan Sinha - Zamindari Abolition

Socialist and JP Era (1967–1989)

- Karpoori Thakur - Bihar Movement (1974) - Jayaprakash Narayan - Bhagalpur riots (1989)

RJD Era (1990–2005)

- Lalu Prasad Yadav - Rabri Devi - Fodder Scam

State Division (2000)

- Bihar Reorganisation Act, 2000 - Creation of Jharkhand

NDA Era (2005–Present)

- Nitish Kumar - Politics of Bihar

Culture, art, and society
Art and architecture

- Mahabodhi Temple - Nalanda - Barabar Caves - Tomb of Sher Shah Suri - Rohtas Fort - Golghar - Mithila Painting - Patna Qalam - Manjusha Art - Didarganj Yakshi

Society and language

- Bihari culture - Mithila • Magadh • Anga - Bihari languages

  - Maithili • Magahi
  - Bhojpuri • Angika
Religion

- Religion in Bihar - Buddhism in Bihar - Jainism in Bihar - Islam in Bihar - Sikhism in Bihar

Portal India Portal Bihar

The Jagdishpur Raj was a feudatory zamindari controlled by a cadet branch of the Ujjainiya dynasty. It was situated in modern-day Jagdishpur, in the erstwhile Shahabad district (now in Bhojpur district) of Bihar. The capital of the principality was the town of Jagdishpur by which the principality derived its name.

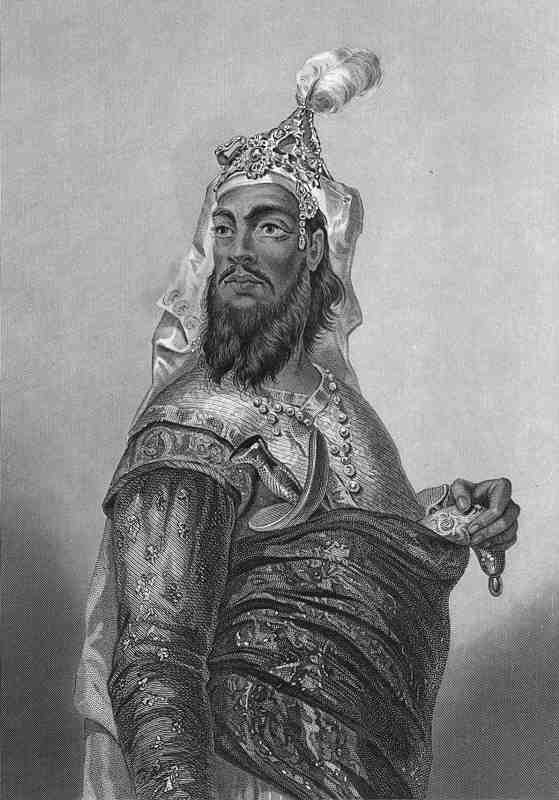
Kunwar Singh, one of the most notable rulers of Jagdishpur.

== History ==
The Ujjainiya branch of Jagdishpur is considered as one of the senior branches of the Ujjainiya dynasty. Raja Mandhata Singh, the last ruler of Bhojpur revolted against the Mughal authority. However, he was killed by his own family members. Due to confusion regarding the succession to the throne of Bhojpur, Mughal governor of Bihar used this opportunity to completely annex Bhojpur and was succeeded and Bhojpur came under the direct administration of Mughal dominion.

However, Raja Sujan Singh, a brother of Raja Mandhata Singh succeeded in getting back 1/3 of his territory and also Jagdishpur, the capital of the erstwhile Kingdom of Bhojpur. He was succeeded by Raja Udwant Singh.

A son of Raja Sujan Singh, Raja Horil Singh established a separate independent principality and declared himself as the separate ruler of Dumraon. The Mughals returned their half of territories but this return of territory came at a cost, they were reduced to the status of minor feudal rulers. Also, the division of territory between family members caused the final downfall of Bhojpur.

== 1857 rebellion ==
During the rule of Kunwar Singh, the estate took part in the Indian Rebellion of 1857. Kunwar Singh was motivated to rebel after having financial difficulties due to the high revenue demanded by the British authorities and family litigation. The British also attempted to take over the management of the estate.

As a result of this, Kunwar Singh (who was 80 at the time) decided to join the rebellion and was considered to be the leader of the rebellion in Bihar. He was helped by his brother, Babu Amar Singh and his commander-in-chief, Hare Krishna Singh. After some initial success, Kunwar Singh and his forces were eventually driven out of Jagdishpur by the British. A year later, Kunwar Singh died and the rebellion was led by his brother who was eventually captured and hanged. Because of these events, many consider Kunwar Singh to be one of the "greatest chiefs" of Jagdishpur.

== Rulers ==
From 1810 to 1947, the Jagdishpur estate was ruled by the following individuals

- Shahabzada Singh
- Kunwar Singh
- Babu Amar Singh
- Shriniwas Singh
- Digvijay Singh (acceded to Indian Union in 1947)

== See also ==
- Zamindars of Bihar
