= Kikata =

Ancient Indian kingdom

Kikata Kīkaṭa
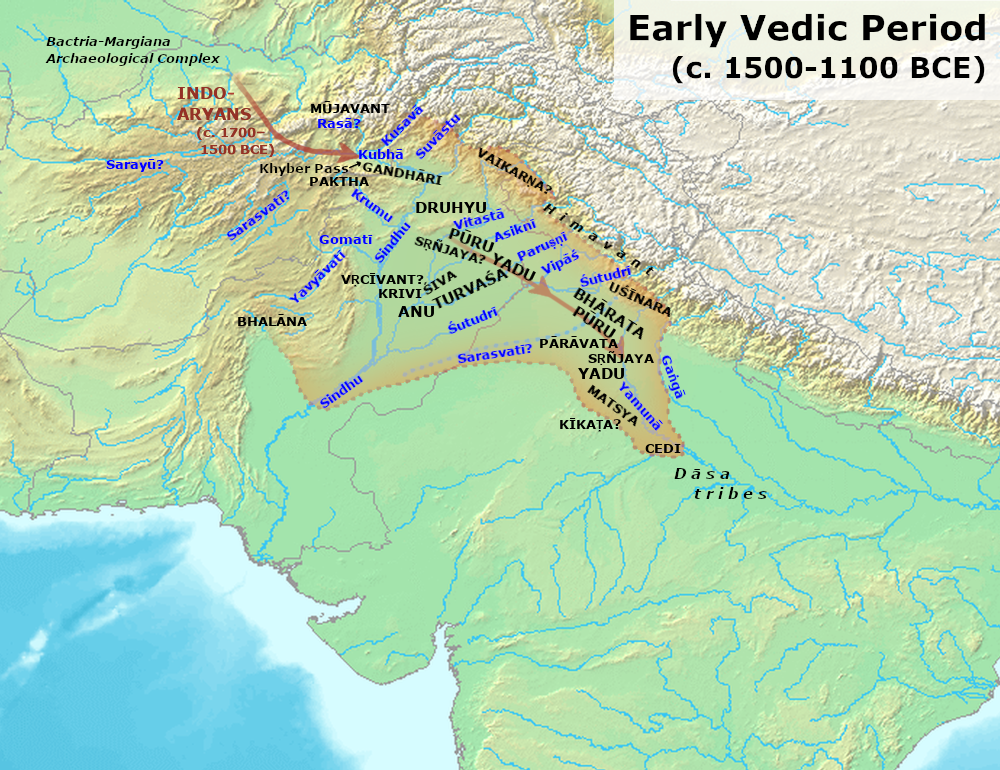
- Common languages: Vedic Sanskrit
- Religion: Historical Vedic Religion
- Government: Monarchy
- Historical era: c. 1500–300 BCE
Preceded by	Succeeded by
Copper Hoard culture	Magadha
- Today part of: India

Part of a series on the
History of Bihar
Ancient History
Prehistoric and Vedic Era

- Chirand (Neolithic) - Vedic period - Videha - Mithila (ancient) - Anga - Kikata

Urbanisation and Shramana

- Second Urbanisation - Rise of Shramana - Buddhism • Jainism • Ajivika

Gaṇasaṅghas

- Magadha - Vajjika League

  - Nāya
  - Vajji (tribe)
  - Licchavis of Vaishali

- Malla (tribe) - Kashi - Bulis

Imperial Magadha

- Brihadratha dynasty - Haryanka dynasty

  - Bimbisara
  - Ajatashatru

- Shishunaga dynasty - Nanda Empire

  - Mahapadma Nanda

- Maurya Empire

  - Chandragupta Maurya
  - Ashoka
Post-Mauryan and Smriti

- Shunga Empire

  - Pushyamitra Shunga

- Kanva dynasty - Development of Smriti - Brahmanical Revival

The Interregnum

- Kushan Influence - Mitra Dynasty - Resurgence of Licchavis

Classical and medieval
The Classical Age

- Gupta Empire

Early Medieval

- Later Gupta dynasty - Maukharis

Pala Era and Feudatories

- Pala Empire - Khayaravala dynasty - Pithipatis of Magadha

Medieval Mithila

- Karnats of Mithila - Oiniwar dynasty

Islamic Incursions

- Delhi Sultanate

Centers of Learning

- Nalanda - Vikramashila - Odantapuri - Telhara monastery

Early-modern
Afghan and Mughal Rule

- Sur Empire

  - Sher Shah Suri

- Mughal Empire

  - Bihar Subah
Regional Chieftaincies

- Chakwars - Chero dynasty - Gidhaur chieftaincy - Kharagpur Raj - Khokhra chieftaincy

Major Zamindari Estates

- Bettiah Raj - Khandavala dynasty - Dumraon Raj - Hathwa Raj - Jagdishpur estate

Colonial & Independence Era
Colonial Rule (1764–1947)

- Battle of Buxar (1764) - East India Company - Permanent Settlement (1793) - Santhal rebellion - Indian Rebellion of 1857

  - Kunwar Singh

- Bihar famine of 1873–74 - Bihar Province (Est. 1912) - 1934 Nepal–Bihar earthquake

Freedom Struggle

- Champaran Satyagraha (1917) - Salt Satyagraha - Bihar Vidyapeeth - Kisan Sabha

  - Swami Sahajanand Saraswati

- Quit India Movement

  - Azad Dasta
Modern Era (Post-1947)
Congress Era (1947–1967)

- Sri Krishna Sinha - Anugrah Narayan Sinha - Zamindari Abolition

Socialist and JP Era (1967–1989)

- Karpoori Thakur - Bihar Movement (1974) - Jayaprakash Narayan - Bhagalpur riots (1989)

RJD Era (1990–2005)

- Lalu Prasad Yadav - Rabri Devi - Fodder Scam

State Division (2000)

- Bihar Reorganisation Act, 2000 - Creation of Jharkhand

NDA Era (2005–Present)

- Nitish Kumar - Politics of Bihar

Culture, art, and society
Art and architecture

- Mahabodhi Temple - Nalanda - Barabar Caves - Tomb of Sher Shah Suri - Rohtas Fort - Golghar - Mithila Painting - Patna Qalam - Manjusha Art - Didarganj Yakshi

Society and language

- Bihari culture - Mithila • Magadh • Anga - Bihari languages

  - Maithili • Magahi
  - Bhojpuri • Angika
Religion

- Religion in Bihar - Buddhism in Bihar - Jainism in Bihar - Islam in Bihar - Sikhism in Bihar

Portal India Portal Bihar

The Kīkaṭa (Sanskrit: कीकट; IAST: kīkaṭa) kingdom, mentioned in the Vedas, is an ancient Indian kingdom whose precise geographical location remains a subject of scholarly debate. While some scholars associate it with the Magadha region in present-day Bihar, because Kikata is used as synonym for Magadha in the later texts; while others suggest a more western location, possibly in the vicinity of Kurukshetra (see below).

The Rigveda references the Kīkaṭas as a non-Vedic people, descendants of Ikshvaku, and of non-Aryan origin, living on the eastern side to Vedic India, who did not practice Vedas, and worshipped Rishabhadeva. Scholars like Zimmer have argued in referring to Ikshvaku, that they were a non-Aryan people. According to Weber, they were a descendants of Pre-Vedic Aryan people and were sometimes in conflict with other Vedic people.

== Location ==
While some scholars associate the Kīkaṭa kingdom with the Magadha region in Bihar, others propose alternative locations based on textual evidence and geographical analysis. Mithila Sharan Pandey suggests a location near Western Uttar Pradesh, while O.P. Bharadwaj places them near the Sarasvati River. Historian Ram Sharan Sharma believes they were likely situated in Haryana, and Michael Witzel proposes a location south of Kurukshetra, possibly in Eastern Rajasthan or Western Madhya Pradesh. Witzel's argument is further supported by the observation that the Magadha region is not explicitly mentioned in the Rigveda.

== References in texts ==
The names, Kitava and Kitika, closely resemble Kikata, and were found in the Mahabharata.

The Ajas, the Prishnis, the Sikatas, the Arunas, and the Kitavas, have all gone to heaven through the merit of Vedic study (12:26).

The Abhishahas, the Surasenas, the Sivis, and the Vasatis, the Ṡalvas, the Matsyas, the Amvashtas, the Trigartas, and the Kekayas, the Sauviras, the Kitavas, and the dwellers of the Eastern, Western, and the Northern countries,--these twelve brave races were resolved to fight reckless of the lives for Bhishma(6:18). The Sauviras, the Kitavas, the Easterners, the Westerners, the Northerners, the Malavas, the Abhishahas, the Surasenas, the Sivis, and the Vasatis were mentioned as taking part in Kurukshetra War siding with the Kauravas (6:107). The Sauviras, the Kitavas, the Easterners, the Westerners, the Northerners, the Malavas, the Abhishahas, the Surasenas, the Sivis, the Vasatis, the Salwas, the Sayas, the Trigartas, the Amvashthas, and the Kaikeyas were again mentioned on the Kaurava side at (6:120).

The tribes Vairamas, Paradas, Tungas, with the Kitavas who lived upon crops that depended on water from the sky or of the river and also they who were born in regions on the sea-shore, in woodlands, or countries on the other side of the ocean waited at the gate, being refused permission to enter, with goats and kine and asses and camels and vegetable, honey and blankets and jewels and gems of various kinds. -- bringing tribute to Pandava king Yudhishthira (2:50).

Madraka, and Karnaveshta, Siddhartha, and also Kitaka; Suvira, and Suvahu, and Mahavira, and also Valhika, Kratha, Vichitra, Suratha, and the handsome king Nila were mentioned as kings at (1:67).

Kikata (कीकट) is mentioned in Mahabharata (VIII.30.45)....."The Karasakaras, the Mahishakas, the Kalingas, the Kikatas, the Atavis, the Karkotakas, the Virakas, and other peoples of no religion, one should always avoid."

Like Rigveda attributes of Kikatas, Atharvaveda also speaks about south eastern tribes like Magadhas and Angas as hostile tribe who lived on the borders of Brahmanical India. According to Puranic literature Kikata is placed near Gaya. It is described as extending from Caran-adri to Gridharakuta (vulture peak), Rajgir.

== List of rulers ==
Known notable rulers were:

- King Kitaka
- Pramangada
- Suvira
- Suvahu
- Mahavira
- Valhika
- Kratha
- Vichitra
- Suratha
- Nila
- Madraka
- Karnaveshta
- Siddhartha

== See also ==
- Janapada
- Mahajanapada
- Rigveda
- Mahabharata and Vyasa
- Historical Vedic religion
