= Kharagpur Raj =

Kingdom of Bihar

- 1503–1840
- Kharagpur Raj (Curruckpour) as part of the Jungle Terry during the early 19th century.
- Status: Independent Kingdom (c. 1503-1615); Tributary of the Mughal Empire (1615 onwards)
- Capital: Haveli Kharagpur
- Religion: Hinduism (1503-1615); Islam (1615 onwards)
- Government: Absolute Monarchy
- Raja
  - 1503: Babu Dandu Rai (first)
  - 1840: Rahmat Ali Khan (last)
- Historical era: Early modern period
  - Established: 1503
  - Disestablished: 1840
Succeeded by
Company rule in India
- Today part of: India; Bihar; Jharkhand

Part of a series on the
History of Bihar
Ancient History
Prehistoric and Vedic Era

- Chirand (Neolithic) - Vedic period - Videha - Mithila (ancient) - Anga - Kikata

Urbanisation and Shramana

- Second Urbanisation - Rise of Shramana - Buddhism • Jainism • Ajivika

Gaṇasaṅghas

- Magadha - Vajjika League

  - Nāya
  - Vajji (tribe)
  - Licchavis of Vaishali

- Malla (tribe) - Kashi - Bulis

Imperial Magadha

- Brihadratha dynasty - Haryanka dynasty

  - Bimbisara
  - Ajatashatru

- Shishunaga dynasty - Nanda Empire

  - Mahapadma Nanda

- Maurya Empire

  - Chandragupta Maurya
  - Ashoka
Post-Mauryan and Smriti

- Shunga Empire

  - Pushyamitra Shunga

- Kanva dynasty - Development of Smriti - Brahmanical Revival

The Interregnum

- Kushan Influence - Mitra Dynasty - Resurgence of Licchavis

Classical and medieval
The Classical Age

- Gupta Empire

Early Medieval

- Later Gupta dynasty - Maukharis

Pala Era and Feudatories

- Pala Empire - Khayaravala dynasty - Pithipatis of Magadha

Medieval Mithila

- Karnats of Mithila - Oiniwar dynasty

Islamic Incursions

- Delhi Sultanate

Centers of Learning

- Nalanda - Vikramashila - Odantapuri - Telhara monastery

Early-modern
Afghan and Mughal Rule

- Sur Empire

  - Sher Shah Suri

- Mughal Empire

  - Bihar Subah
Regional Chieftaincies

- Chakwars - Chero dynasty - Gidhaur chieftaincy - Kharagpur Raj - Khokhra chieftaincy

Major Zamindari Estates

- Bettiah Raj - Khandavala dynasty - Dumraon Raj - Hathwa Raj - Jagdishpur estate

Colonial & Independence Era
Colonial Rule (1764–1947)

- Battle of Buxar (1764) - East India Company - Permanent Settlement (1793) - Santhal rebellion - Indian Rebellion of 1857

  - Kunwar Singh

- Bihar famine of 1873–74 - Bihar Province (Est. 1912) - 1934 Nepal–Bihar earthquake

Freedom Struggle

- Champaran Satyagraha (1917) - Salt Satyagraha - Bihar Vidyapeeth - Kisan Sabha

  - Swami Sahajanand Saraswati

- Quit India Movement

  - Azad Dasta
Modern Era (Post-1947)
Congress Era (1947–1967)

- Sri Krishna Sinha - Anugrah Narayan Sinha - Zamindari Abolition

Socialist and JP Era (1967–1989)

- Karpoori Thakur - Bihar Movement (1974) - Jayaprakash Narayan - Bhagalpur riots (1989)

RJD Era (1990–2005)

- Lalu Prasad Yadav - Rabri Devi - Fodder Scam

State Division (2000)

- Bihar Reorganisation Act, 2000 - Creation of Jharkhand

NDA Era (2005–Present)

- Nitish Kumar - Politics of Bihar

Culture, art, and society
Art and architecture

- Mahabodhi Temple - Nalanda - Barabar Caves - Tomb of Sher Shah Suri - Rohtas Fort - Golghar - Mithila Painting - Patna Qalam - Manjusha Art - Didarganj Yakshi

Society and language

- Bihari culture - Mithila • Magadh • Anga - Bihari languages

  - Maithili • Magahi
  - Bhojpuri • Angika
Religion

- Religion in Bihar - Buddhism in Bihar - Jainism in Bihar - Islam in Bihar - Sikhism in Bihar

Portal India Portal Bihar

Kharagpur Raj was a prominent chieftaincy, founded in the early 16th century in Bihar situated mainly in modern-day Munger district. They were notable for being one of the few chieftaincies in Bihar to convert to Islam and many of the rulers became firm allies of the Mughal authorities. At its peak, the Kharagpur Raj encompassed parts of the modern-day districts of Munger, Bhagalpur, Jamui, Lakhisarai, Godda and Deoghar. Due to its size, the Privy Council compared it with the Kingdom of Sardinia.

== Origins ==
The chieftaincy of Kharagpur Raj was founded by the Hindu Kinwar Rajput, Babu Dandu Rai in 1503. The original rulers of this region were the Khetauris. 3 Rajput brothers, Babu Dandu Rai, Basdeo Rai and Mahender Rai from Bhojpur arrived in the region and worked for the Khetauri chief, Raja Sasanka. These three brothers eventually amassed a large following of their clansmen and deposed the Khetauris and murdered the entire family. They continued their expansion and gradually defeated all of the 52 Khetauri chiefs. Babu Dandu Rai being the eldest of the brothers established himself as the new territorial lord. He ruled for 22 years before being succeeded by his sons, Narendra Shahi and Rup Shahi.

Dandu Rai's grandson was Raja Sangram Singh who was a contemporary of Emperor Akbar. Sangram Singh initially pledged allegiance to Akbar however from 1601 onwards he rebelled against the Mughals and attempted to declare independence with the help of his son, Toral Mal. Mughal sources attest to Sangram Singh being killed in battle and his son, Toral Mal converting to Islam and reaffirming his loyalty to the Mughals. He was renamed as Roz Afzun.

The Chieftaincy of Chai was a principality founded by a branch of the Kharagpur family in the 16th century. Its capital was in Alamnagar in Bhagalpur district.

== Notable rulers ==
=== Sangram Singh ===
Raja Sangram Singh was contemporary of Akbar. He initially was allegiance to Akbar and suppression of Afghan rebellion but later during reign of Jahangir, he rebelled against Mughal rule and killed in battle with Mughal. Then his son Todar Mal converted to Islam and later appointed as the king of Kharagpur.

=== Roz Afzun ===
Roz Afzun was considered to be a loyal "servant" and commander for the Mughal authorities. Emperor Jahangir went as far as to refer to him as his most "favourite" and "permanent" servant of the Empire. He was ordered to assist Mahabat Khan in repelling an invasion by the Afghans of Balkh and dealing with insurrections by the Bundela Rajputs and he was successful in these endeavours. He achieved a rank of 2,000 zat and 1,000 sawar which was the highest of any chieftain in Bihar at the time. He is often referred to as an example of the Mughals successfully integrating a previously refractory chieftain. He died in 1631 and was succeeded by his son, Raja Bahroz.

=== Raja Bahroz Singh ===
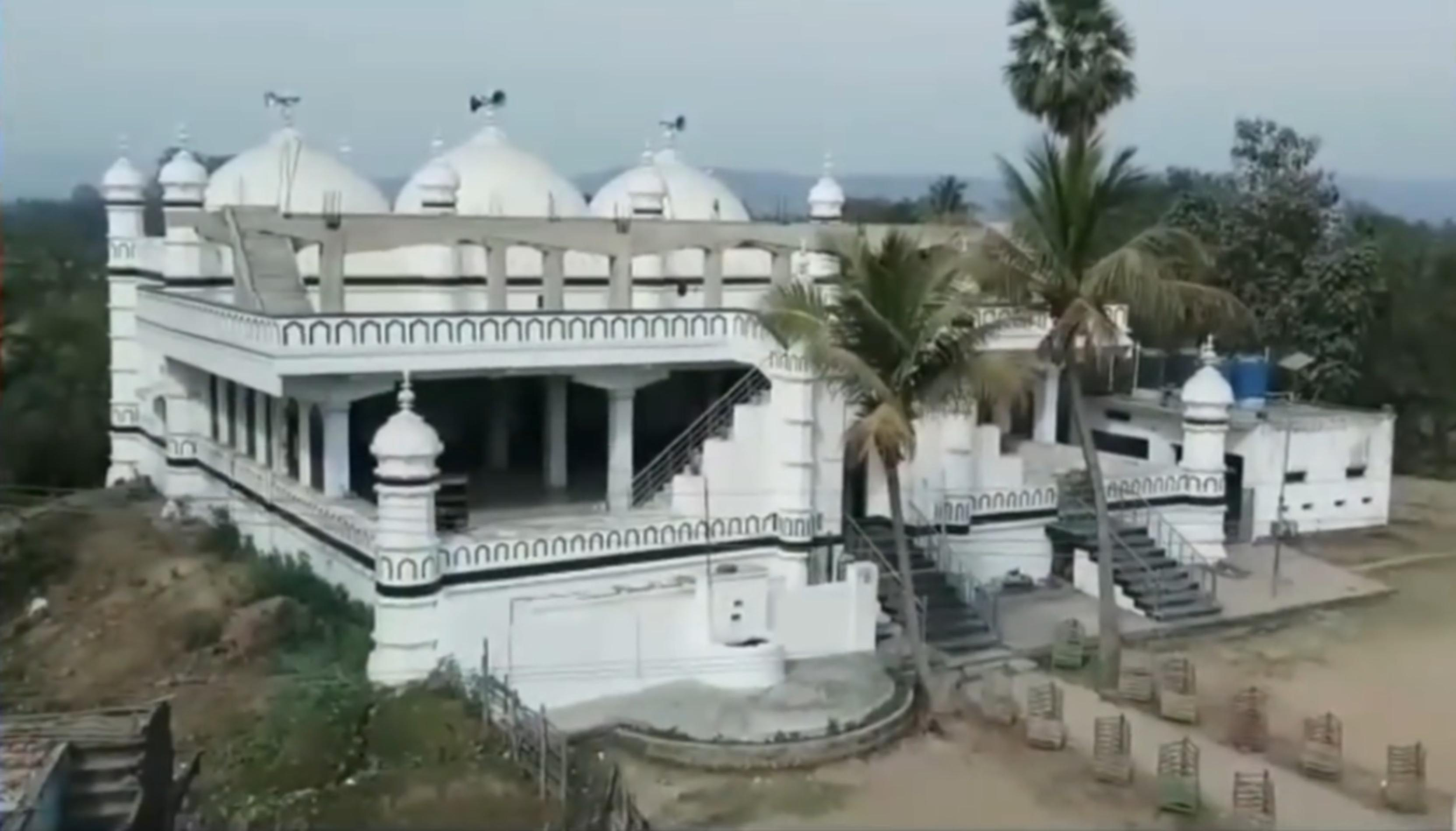
Shahi Masjid which was built during the reign of Raja Bahroz Singh

Raja Bahroz Singh ruled Kharagpur Raj from 1631 to 1676. He earned the favour of Emperor Shah Jahan by embarking on a military expedition to Kandahar to pacify the local ruler. He also participated in expeditions against other refractory chiefs including Nazar Muhammad of Balkh and Jujhar Singh Bundela. Records from the time also attest to Kharagpur being quite prosperous during his reign. In particular, he instituted various reforms that encouraged increased cultivation. He also established the Ghatwali system which delegated law and order in sensitive regions to smaller land-owners.

=== Raja Tahawar Singh ===
Tahawar Singh (also known as Kunwar Tahawurr Asad), the son of Raja Bahroz, ruled Kharagpur from 1676 to 1727 and was a contemporary of Emperor Aurangzeb. He played an active role in multiple Mughal expeditions against rebellious forces including the nearby Chero dynasty of Palamu in modern-day Jharkhand and the Jaintia kingdom of Sylhet. He was noted for being an effective administrator of Kharagpur.

== Downfall ==
By the time Rahmat Ali Khan became ruler in the 1800s, Kharagpur had lost its prior position as a prominent chieftaincy in the Mughal Empire and was now a zamindari estate in financial trouble. He fell into arrears with the government revenue and was forced to sell much of his estate to the zamindars of Banaili and Darbhanga which ended a dynasty that lasted for almost 400 years.

The estate was sold to the royal house of Sathasi Raj in present-day Deoria district of Uttar Pradesh.

== Architecture ==
By the 17th century, Munger was considered to be a well fortified town with buildings in fine condition.

Francis Buchanan-Hamilton visited Kharagpur in 1811 when Raja Qadir Ali was ruling and noted the following:

Even the houses of the Raja of Kharagpur although it contains some small portions of brick are but a sorry place. Near it, however there is a very handsome mosque overhanging the Man river in a fine situation, while he is erecting opposite a building that promises to be ornamental, and it is intended to celebrate the memory of the grandson of the Prophet. The vicinity is ornamented by the ruins of a house that belonged to his grandfather, and went to ruin during the insurrection which he raised against the last remnants of the Mughal force. It has been a very large building and looks more like an old European castle than anything I have seen.

== See also ==
- Muslim Rajputs
- Zamindars of Bihar
