= Bihar Reorganisation Act, 2000 =

2000 Indian law creating the state of Jharkhand

Parliament of India
- Long title: An Act to provide for the reorganisation of the existing State of Bihar and for matters connected therewith.
- Territorial extent: Bihar
- Enacted by: Parliament of India
- Status: In force

Part of a series on the
History of Bihar
Ancient History
Prehistoric and Vedic Era

- Chirand (Neolithic) - Vedic period - Videha - Mithila (ancient) - Anga - Kikata

Urbanisation and Shramana

- Second Urbanisation - Rise of Shramana - Buddhism • Jainism • Ajivika

Gaṇasaṅghas

- Magadha - Vajjika League

  - Nāya
  - Vajji (tribe)
  - Licchavis of Vaishali

- Malla (tribe) - Kashi - Bulis

Imperial Magadha

- Brihadratha dynasty - Haryanka dynasty

  - Bimbisara
  - Ajatashatru

- Shishunaga dynasty - Nanda Empire

  - Mahapadma Nanda

- Maurya Empire

  - Chandragupta Maurya
  - Ashoka
Post-Mauryan and Smriti

- Shunga Empire

  - Pushyamitra Shunga

- Kanva dynasty - Development of Smriti - Brahmanical Revival

The Interregnum

- Kushan Influence - Mitra Dynasty - Resurgence of Licchavis

Classical and medieval
The Classical Age

- Gupta Empire

Early Medieval

- Later Gupta dynasty - Maukharis

Pala Era and Feudatories

- Pala Empire - Khayaravala dynasty - Pithipatis of Magadha

Medieval Mithila

- Karnats of Mithila - Oiniwar dynasty

Islamic Incursions

- Delhi Sultanate

Centers of Learning

- Nalanda - Vikramashila - Odantapuri - Telhara monastery

Early-modern
Afghan and Mughal Rule

- Sur Empire

  - Sher Shah Suri

- Mughal Empire

  - Bihar Subah
Regional Chieftaincies

- Chakwars - Chero dynasty - Gidhaur chieftaincy - Kharagpur Raj - Khokhra chieftaincy

Major Zamindari Estates

- Bettiah Raj - Khandavala dynasty - Dumraon Raj - Hathwa Raj - Jagdishpur estate

Colonial & Independence Era
Colonial Rule (1764–1947)

- Battle of Buxar (1764) - East India Company - Permanent Settlement (1793) - Santhal rebellion - Indian Rebellion of 1857

  - Kunwar Singh

- Bihar famine of 1873–74 - Bihar Province (Est. 1912) - 1934 Nepal–Bihar earthquake

Freedom Struggle

- Champaran Satyagraha (1917) - Salt Satyagraha - Bihar Vidyapeeth - Kisan Sabha

  - Swami Sahajanand Saraswati

- Quit India Movement

  - Azad Dasta
Modern Era (Post-1947)
Congress Era (1947–1967)

- Sri Krishna Sinha - Anugrah Narayan Sinha - Zamindari Abolition

Socialist and JP Era (1967–1989)

- Karpoori Thakur - Bihar Movement (1974) - Jayaprakash Narayan - Bhagalpur riots (1989)

RJD Era (1990–2005)

- Lalu Prasad Yadav - Rabri Devi - Fodder Scam

State Division (2000)

- Bihar Reorganisation Act, 2000 - Creation of Jharkhand

NDA Era (2005–Present)

- Nitish Kumar - Politics of Bihar

Culture, art, and society
Art and architecture

- Mahabodhi Temple - Nalanda - Barabar Caves - Tomb of Sher Shah Suri - Rohtas Fort - Golghar - Mithila Painting - Patna Qalam - Manjusha Art - Didarganj Yakshi

Society and language

- Bihari culture - Mithila • Magadh • Anga - Bihari languages

  - Maithili • Magahi
  - Bhojpuri • Angika
Religion

- Religion in Bihar - Buddhism in Bihar - Jainism in Bihar - Islam in Bihar - Sikhism in Bihar

Portal India Portal Bihar

The Bihar Reorganisation Act, 2000 was a law passed by the parliament of India in 2000. Loksabha and Rajya sabha passed the bill on 2 and 11 August respectively and on 15 November 2000, which enabled creation of Jharkhand State out of Bihar. The law was introduced by the NDA government headed by Prime Minister Atal Bihari Vajpayee to fulfil an election promise.

== Background ==
The reorganisation of Bihar and the creation of Jharkhand were preceded by decades of tribal and regional activism, collectively referred to as the Jharkhand movement. Leaders such as Jaipal Singh Munda, Binod Bihari Mahato, and Shibu Soren played pivotal roles in mobilizing support for statehood, culminating in the passage of the Bihar Reorganisation Act, 2000.

== Criticism ==
This act has been the subject of criticism from various political leaders. Former Bihar Chief Minister, Lalu Prasad Yadav, opposed the bifurcation, stating that the division of the state would weaken Bihar economically and socially, and was reported as saying that Jharkhand would be created "over his dead body". His successor, Rabri Devi, later demanded a special economic package and special status for the truncated Bihar, arguing that the state had been left disadvantaged after losing its mineral-rich southern districts.

Other leaders from Bihar, including Nitish Kumar, supported the creation of Jharkhand in principle but criticised the Centre for not compensating Bihar adequately. Kumar repeatedly pressed for Special Category Status, contending that the bifurcation left Bihar without its industrial base and limited resources.

Within the Bharatiya Janata Party (BJP), Sushil Kumar Modi drew attention to unresolved provisions of the Act, pointing out that Jharkhand owed Bihar more than ₹5,000 crore in pension liabilities under the settlement clauses, highlighting the financial disputes that followed reorganisation.

On the Jharkhand side, Arjun Munda, a former Chief Minister of Jharkhand, described the Act as biased in the division of assets and liabilities, arguing that the Centre’s handling of the reorganisation created prolonged disputes between the two states.

== Districts forming the new state ==
The following districts of the existing State of Bihar formed the new state of Jharkhand:

- Bokaro
- Chatra
- Deoghar
- Dhanbad
- Dumka
- Garhwa
- Giridih
- Godda
- Gumla
- Hazaribagh
- Kodarma
- Lohardaga
- Pakur
- Palamu
- Ranchi (the new capital)
- Sahebganj
- Singhbhum (East)
- Singhbhum (West)

== Resulting changes ==
The Bihar Reorganisation Act, 2000 came into effect on 15 November 2000, leading to the creation of the state of Jharkhand from eighteen districts of southern Bihar, including Ranchi, Dhanbad, Bokaro, Jamshedpur (East Singhbhum), Hazaribagh and Dumka.

The Act introduced a number of institutional and administrative changes:

Legislature and Executive - Jharkhand received its own Legislative Assembly (Vidhan Sabha) and Council of Ministers headed by a Chief Minister, along with a separate Governor appointed by the President of India. Representation of both Bihar and Jharkhand in the Lok Sabha (Lower house) and Rajya Sabha (Upper House) was redistributed.

Judiciary - A separate High Court for Jharkhand was established at Ranchi. Until the court came into operation, the jurisdiction of the Patna High Court extended over Jharkhand.

Public services – State government employees were allocated between Bihar and Jharkhand. Separate public service commissions were constituted like Jharkhand Public Service Commission and the All India Services cadres were reorganised into the Bihar cadre and the Jharkhand cadre.

Corporations and institutions - Assets and liabilities of corporations, boards and state enterprises, including the Bihar State Electricity Board and transport corporations, were divided between the two states, that resulted the creation of Jharkhand State Electricity Board. Certain bodies such as the Damodar Valley Corporation continued to operate as inter-state.

Finances - The Act provided for division of revenues, debts, and pension liabilities between Bihar and Jharkhand.

Law and order - A separate Jharkhand Police force was created and the offices of Advocate General and related judicial bodies were established for the new state.

== Distribution of seats after reorganisation ==
Entity	Undivided Bihar (before 2000)	New	
Entity	Undivided Bihar (before 2000)	Bihar	Jharkhand
Rajya Sabha Seats	22	16 (list)	6 (list)
Lok Sabha Seats	54	40 (list)	14 (list)
Legislative Assembly constituencies	324	243 (list)	81 (list)

In addition, the Jharkhand High Court was set up under the 2000 Act.

== See also ==
- Madhya Pradesh Reorganisation Act, 2000, by which Chhattisgarh was created
- Uttar Pradesh Reorganisation Act, 2000, by which Uttarakhand was created
- Jharkhand movement
- Jharkhand Day
- Jharkhand Mukti Morcha
