= Hathwa Raj =

Chieftaincy in Bihar

Hathwa
- Early medieval period–1952
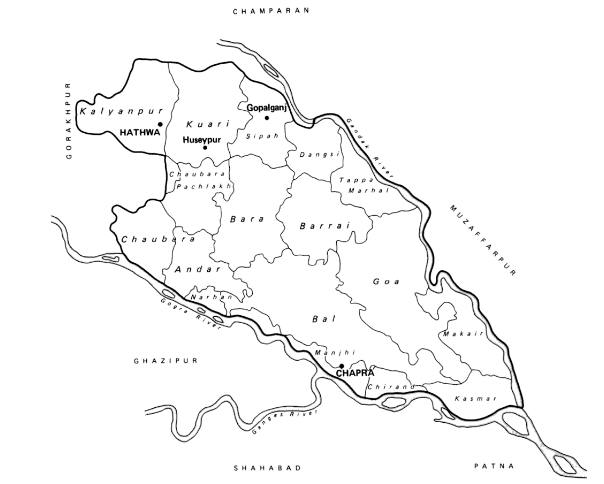
- Map of the Hathwa chieftaincy in 1900
- Capital: Kalyanpur
- Religion: Hinduism
- Historical era: Mughal period
  - Established: Early medieval period
  - Disestablished: 1952

Part of a series on the
History of Bihar
Ancient History
Prehistoric and Vedic Era

- Chirand (Neolithic) - Vedic period - Videha - Mithila (ancient) - Anga - Kikata

Urbanisation and Shramana

- Second Urbanisation - Rise of Shramana - Buddhism • Jainism • Ajivika

Gaṇasaṅghas

- Magadha - Vajjika League

  - Nāya
  - Vajji (tribe)
  - Licchavis of Vaishali

- Malla (tribe) - Kashi - Bulis

Imperial Magadha

- Brihadratha dynasty - Haryanka dynasty

  - Bimbisara
  - Ajatashatru

- Shishunaga dynasty - Nanda Empire

  - Mahapadma Nanda

- Maurya Empire

  - Chandragupta Maurya
  - Ashoka
Post-Mauryan and Smriti

- Shunga Empire

  - Pushyamitra Shunga

- Kanva dynasty - Development of Smriti - Brahmanical Revival

The Interregnum

- Kushan Influence - Mitra Dynasty - Resurgence of Licchavis

Classical and medieval
The Classical Age

- Gupta Empire

Early Medieval

- Later Gupta dynasty - Maukharis

Pala Era and Feudatories

- Pala Empire - Khayaravala dynasty - Pithipatis of Magadha

Medieval Mithila

- Karnats of Mithila - Oiniwar dynasty

Islamic Incursions

- Delhi Sultanate

Centers of Learning

- Nalanda - Vikramashila - Odantapuri - Telhara monastery

Early-modern
Afghan and Mughal Rule

- Sur Empire

  - Sher Shah Suri

- Mughal Empire

  - Bihar Subah
Regional Chieftaincies

- Chakwars - Chero dynasty - Gidhaur chieftaincy - Kharagpur Raj - Khokhra chieftaincy

Major Zamindari Estates

- Bettiah Raj - Khandavala dynasty - Dumraon Raj - Hathwa Raj - Jagdishpur estate

Colonial & Independence Era
Colonial Rule (1764–1947)

- Battle of Buxar (1764) - East India Company - Permanent Settlement (1793) - Santhal rebellion - Indian Rebellion of 1857

  - Kunwar Singh

- Bihar famine of 1873–74 - Bihar Province (Est. 1912) - 1934 Nepal–Bihar earthquake

Freedom Struggle

- Champaran Satyagraha (1917) - Salt Satyagraha - Bihar Vidyapeeth - Kisan Sabha

  - Swami Sahajanand Saraswati

- Quit India Movement

  - Azad Dasta
Modern Era (Post-1947)
Congress Era (1947–1967)

- Sri Krishna Sinha - Anugrah Narayan Sinha - Zamindari Abolition

Socialist and JP Era (1967–1989)

- Karpoori Thakur - Bihar Movement (1974) - Jayaprakash Narayan - Bhagalpur riots (1989)

RJD Era (1990–2005)

- Lalu Prasad Yadav - Rabri Devi - Fodder Scam

State Division (2000)

- Bihar Reorganisation Act, 2000 - Creation of Jharkhand

NDA Era (2005–Present)

- Nitish Kumar - Politics of Bihar

Culture, art, and society
Art and architecture

- Mahabodhi Temple - Nalanda - Barabar Caves - Tomb of Sher Shah Suri - Rohtas Fort - Golghar - Mithila Painting - Patna Qalam - Manjusha Art - Didarganj Yakshi

Society and language

- Bihari culture - Mithila • Magadh • Anga - Bihari languages

  - Maithili • Magahi
  - Bhojpuri • Angika
Religion

- Religion in Bihar - Buddhism in Bihar - Jainism in Bihar - Islam in Bihar - Sikhism in Bihar

Portal India Portal Bihar

Hathwa Raj also known as the Kalyanpur chieftaincy was a chieftaincy established in what is now Saran division of Bihar. It comprised 1,365 villages across Chhapra, Siwan, and Gopalganj districts of Bihar, with a population exceeding 391,000 and generating an annual revenue of nearly one million rupees at the time of independence. Earlier seats of the Raj included Huseypur, Kalyanpur, Balchowra and Baghoch. The Kalyanpur chieftaincy was subjugated by the Mughal Emperor Akbar during late 16th century.

== History ==
Legends state that the region of Kalyanpur was originally ruled by the Cheros who were later supplanted by the Rajputs who in turn were replaced by the Bhumihars who became the ancestors of the Hathwa Rajas. The earliest reference to the Hathwa chieftaincy is in 1539 when Emperor Humayun sought refuge in Kalyanpur after his defeat at the Battle of Chausa. The Raja of the time, Raja Jay Mal provided aid to Humayun by giving food to his troops. Because Jay Mal provided aid to his enemy, Sher Shah Suri attempted to punish the Hathwa chieftain who in turn fled to the forests of Gorakhpur to lead an insurgency. By the time Humayun had returned to the throne, he rewarded Jay Mal's grandson, Raja Jubraj Shahi, with a substantial amount of land. Jubraj Shahi also engaged in a conflict with Kabul Mohammad of Barharia, a neighbouring chieftain of Afghan origin. Jubraj Shahi emerged victorious after he killed Kabul Mohammad and captured his fort and land. Because Kabul Mohammad was also rebelling against the Empire, Emperor Akbar rewarded Jubraj Shahi with additional land. Abul Fazl provides information on Kalyan Mal, the chieftain of Hathwa in the 1580s. When the rebel of Ghazipur, Masum Khan Farankhudi, was defeated by the Mughal general, Shahbaz Khan Kamboh, Farankhudi sought shelter in Kalyanpur. However Kalyan Mal refused to grant any assistance and as a result the rebel went back to Ghazipur and submitted himself before the Mughal governor. Local sources indicate that it was due to this and other instances of providing assistance that Akbar granted him the title of Raja.

There is little information about Hathwa from imperial sources during the reign of Emperor Jahangir although local sources indicate that Raja Khemkaran maintained good relations with the Emperor and was granted the title Raja Bahadur in 1625. He also changed the location of his capital from Kalyanpur to Husainpur whereupon a new fort was built.

Sir Kishen Pratap Sahi Bahadur who was the Maharaja between 1874 and 1896 was an ascetic. Soon after his coronation, he set out on a pilgrimage to the shrines of Northern India. Later on he used to regularly go on travelling and pilgrimage, mostly in Benares. Due to its central location, Hathwa was the seat of the Raja's residential palace and its nearby villages housed most of the key retainers of the estate.

In addition to the estate Kachcheri (office), located in the Hathwa cluster of villages, were the estate manager's bungalow, the Diwan's house, the Hathwa Eden School, the post office, the Raj dispensary, the Durga medical hall and the temple called Gopal mandir.

By the 1840s Hathwa was described as having large bazaars and bi-weekly markets. By the early nineteenth century, there were forts, palaces, and several temples constructed. An early twentieth-century account describes Hathwa as an impressive standard market, its shops offering a range of agricultural and consumer goods and its specialists providing a variety of services. The presence of schools and temples further accentuated its centrality in the locality. The estate collected money annually as professional tax from traders stationed at Hathwa.

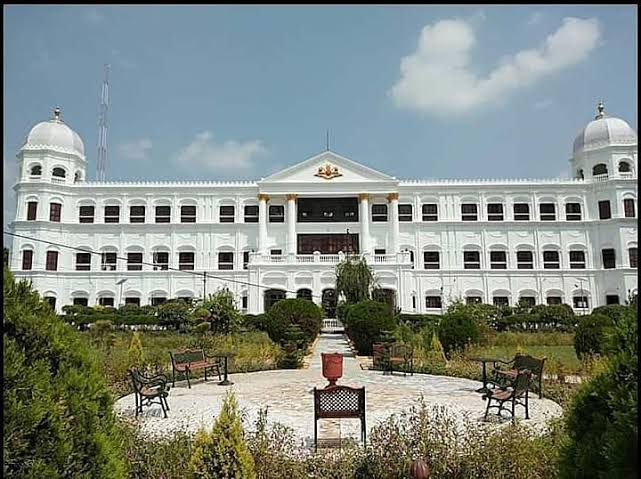
Palace belonging to the Hathwa Raj

== Durga Puja ==
Durga Puja was a major attraction for the Hathwa Raj family and all the family members would gather to worship their Durga at Thawe Mandir. Rituals consisted of the Maharaja traveling in a buggy to the Gopal Mandir, and then to the Sheesh Mahal for the annual durbar and onwards on an elephant for darshan of the Maiyya on Vijayadashmi. The Hathwa family still celebrates some of the customs including sacrificing buffaloes and goats during puja.

== See also ==
- Zamindars of Bihar
