= Dumraon Raj =

Princely state

- 1709–1952
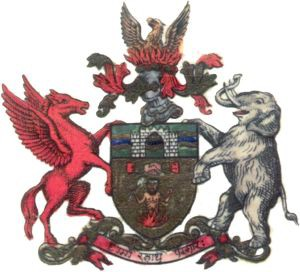
- Coat of arms
- Status: Vassal state under Mughal Empire (1709-1734); Zamindari under Nawab of Bengal (1734-1757); Zamindari under British India (1757-1952)
- Capital: Dumraon
- Religion: Hinduism (official)
- Government: Fedual Monarchy
- Maharaja
  - 1701: Raja Horil Singh (first)
  - 1952: Maharaja Bahadur Ram Ran Vijay Prasad Singh (last)
- Historical era: Medieval India
  - Established: 1709
  - Disestablished: 1952
Preceded by	Succeeded by
Kingdom of Bhojpur	Republic of India

Part of a series on the
History of Bihar
Ancient History
Prehistoric and Vedic Era

- Chirand (Neolithic) - Vedic period - Videha - Mithila (ancient) - Anga - Kikata

Urbanisation and Shramana

- Second Urbanisation - Rise of Shramana - Buddhism • Jainism • Ajivika

Gaṇasaṅghas

- Magadha - Vajjika League

  - Nāya
  - Vajji (tribe)
  - Licchavis of Vaishali

- Malla (tribe) - Kashi - Bulis

Imperial Magadha

- Brihadratha dynasty - Haryanka dynasty

  - Bimbisara
  - Ajatashatru

- Shishunaga dynasty - Nanda Empire

  - Mahapadma Nanda

- Maurya Empire

  - Chandragupta Maurya
  - Ashoka
Post-Mauryan and Smriti

- Shunga Empire

  - Pushyamitra Shunga

- Kanva dynasty - Development of Smriti - Brahmanical Revival

The Interregnum

- Kushan Influence - Mitra Dynasty - Resurgence of Licchavis

Classical and medieval
The Classical Age

- Gupta Empire

Early Medieval

- Later Gupta dynasty - Maukharis

Pala Era and Feudatories

- Pala Empire - Khayaravala dynasty - Pithipatis of Magadha

Medieval Mithila

- Karnats of Mithila - Oiniwar dynasty

Islamic Incursions

- Delhi Sultanate

Centers of Learning

- Nalanda - Vikramashila - Odantapuri - Telhara monastery

Early-modern
Afghan and Mughal Rule

- Sur Empire

  - Sher Shah Suri

- Mughal Empire

  - Bihar Subah
Regional Chieftaincies

- Chakwars - Chero dynasty - Gidhaur chieftaincy - Kharagpur Raj - Khokhra chieftaincy

Major Zamindari Estates

- Bettiah Raj - Khandavala dynasty - Dumraon Raj - Hathwa Raj - Jagdishpur estate

Colonial & Independence Era
Colonial Rule (1764–1947)

- Battle of Buxar (1764) - East India Company - Permanent Settlement (1793) - Santhal rebellion - Indian Rebellion of 1857

  - Kunwar Singh

- Bihar famine of 1873–74 - Bihar Province (Est. 1912) - 1934 Nepal–Bihar earthquake

Freedom Struggle

- Champaran Satyagraha (1917) - Salt Satyagraha - Bihar Vidyapeeth - Kisan Sabha

  - Swami Sahajanand Saraswati

- Quit India Movement

  - Azad Dasta
Modern Era (Post-1947)
Congress Era (1947–1967)

- Sri Krishna Sinha - Anugrah Narayan Sinha - Zamindari Abolition

Socialist and JP Era (1967–1989)

- Karpoori Thakur - Bihar Movement (1974) - Jayaprakash Narayan - Bhagalpur riots (1989)

RJD Era (1990–2005)

- Lalu Prasad Yadav - Rabri Devi - Fodder Scam

State Division (2000)

- Bihar Reorganisation Act, 2000 - Creation of Jharkhand

NDA Era (2005–Present)

- Nitish Kumar - Politics of Bihar

Culture, art, and society
Art and architecture

- Mahabodhi Temple - Nalanda - Barabar Caves - Tomb of Sher Shah Suri - Rohtas Fort - Golghar - Mithila Painting - Patna Qalam - Manjusha Art - Didarganj Yakshi

Society and language

- Bihari culture - Mithila • Magadh • Anga - Bihari languages

  - Maithili • Magahi
  - Bhojpuri • Angika
Religion

- Religion in Bihar - Buddhism in Bihar - Jainism in Bihar - Islam in Bihar - Sikhism in Bihar

Portal India Portal Bihar

The Dumraon Raj was a feudal principality in the Bhojpur region ruled by the Ujjainiya dynasty. The principality was founded when Raja Horil Singh founded a separate capital for himself in the town of Dumraon. The name Dumraon Raj came from its capital town.

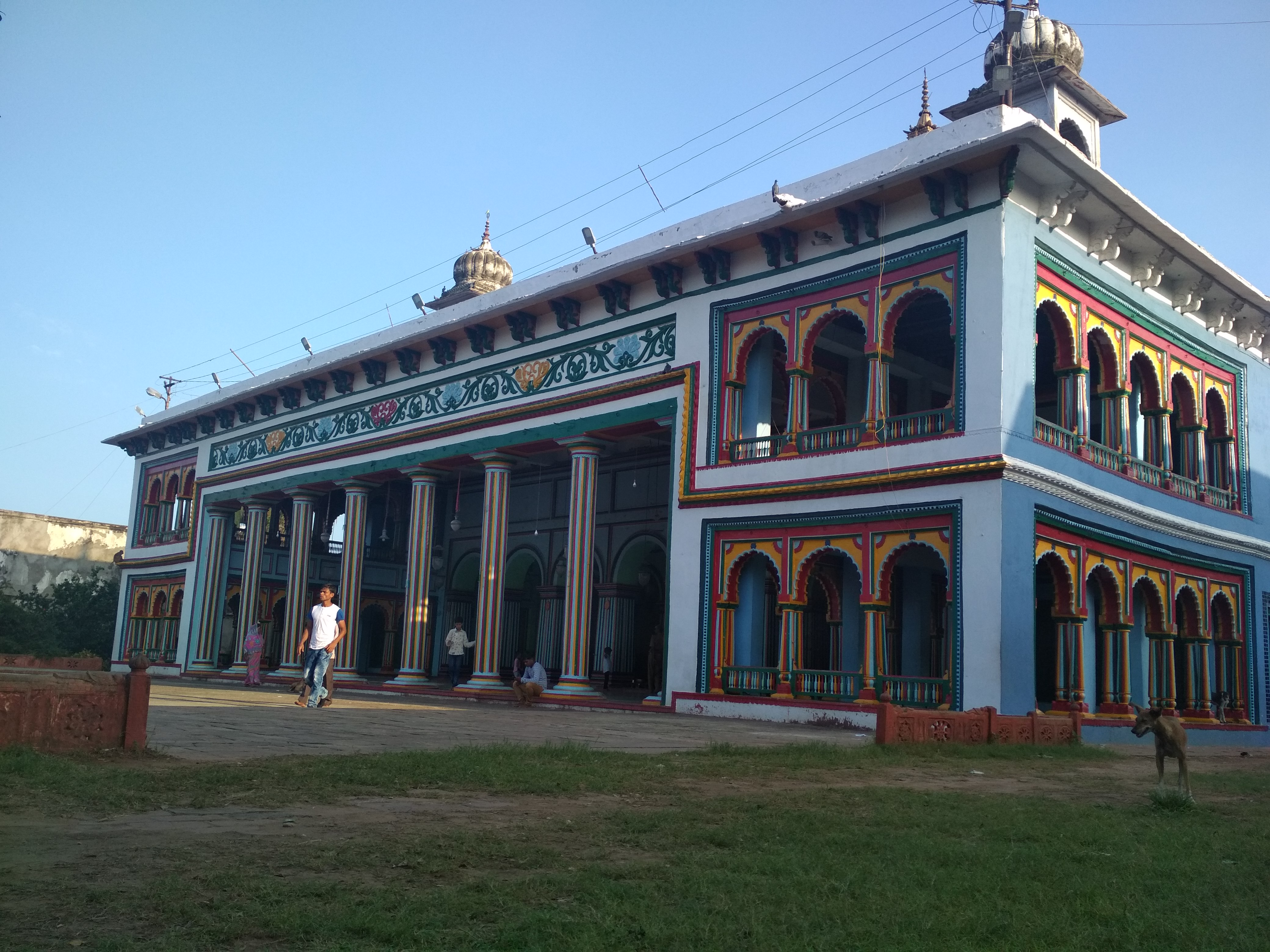
The famous Bihari Ji ka Mandir built by the Maharaja of Dumraon

It was a zamindari state during British era. During the time of Indian independence, Dumraon Raj covered an area of 2,330 km^{2} which stretched from Buxar district in west Bihar to Ballia district in the Purvanchal region of Uttar Pradesh. In Ballia district, Dumraon Raj covered rights of more than 70 villages which are located on the banks of the Ganga river.

The royal family of Dumraon is also the main patron of the famous Brahampur fair.

== History ==
The founders of Dumraon Raj were Ujjainiya Rajputs who traced their origin to the Parmar rulers of Malwa who moved to Western Bihar in the 14th century. In the medieval era, the head seat of Ujjainiyas was Bhojpur.

Raja Mukutman Shahi who ascended the throne of Bhojpur in 1601 was highly unpopular amongst his kinsmen and thus he was forced to abdicate in 1607 in favour of his nephew.

In 1607, Raja Narayan Mal came to the throne of Bhojpur and he was recognised as the new ruler of Bhojpur by Mughal Emperor. He received the title of Raja and was granted the rank mansab of 5000. In the Battle of Buxar 1607-1608, he routed the Chero and Munda forces. The Rajas of Bhojpur were known for their rebellious behaviour against Mughal rule and during the family feud of the ruling family of Bhojpur, the Mughal governor found this opportunity to completely sack Bhojpur. The territory of Bhojpur was sacked in the year 1699 and it came under direct Mughal rule.

One of the descendants of Raja Narayan Mal, Raja Horil Singh, established himself separately and built the capital town of Dumraon in 1709. He got recognised to rule his dominion under Mughal rule. This is how Dumraon Raj came into existence. However, the rulers of Dumraon Raj were only recognised as feudal rulers.

== Rulers ==
The rulers of Dumraon Raj used the title Raja and later Maharaja.

- Raja Horil Singh, he separated himself and his principality from its parent house and declared himself as the independent ruler of Dumraon.
- Raja Vikramaditya Singh
- Raja Jai Prakash Singh
- Raja Janki Prasad Singh
- Raja Maheshwar Baksh Singh
- Maharaja Radha Prasad Singh
- Maharani Beni Prasad Kuari
- Maharaja Srinivas Prasad Singh
- Maharaja Keshav Prasad Singh
- Maharaja Ram Ran Vijay Prasad Singh
- Maharaja Kamal Bahadur Singh

== See also ==
- Ujjainiya
- Zamindars of Bihar
