= Babu Amar Singh =

Participant in the Indian rebellion of 1857

Amar Singh

Raja of Jagdishpur
- Predecessor: Kunwar Singh
- Successor: Mahadev singh bishen
- Successor: Jagdish singh bishen
- Successor: Anil singh bishen
- Born: Jagdispur, Bihar
- Died: 1859
- House: Ujjainiya
- Father: Raja Sahebzada Singh
- Mother: Rani Panchratan Kunwari Devi Singh

Babu Amar Singh was a revolutionary in the Indian Rebellion of 1857 and the brother of Kunwar Singh, the ruler of Jagdishpur principality.

== Early life ==
Amar Singh was the second son of Sahebzada Singh born much after his older brother. He was described as being tall, of fair complexion and having a mole on the right side of his nose. He was a fond huntsman and enjoyed hunting big game including elephants, bears and wolves. He was also a deeply religious person and had the Mahabharata recited to him every night. He was initially reluctant to join the rebellion but agreed to do so on the insistence of his brother and the commander-in-chief, Hare Krishna Singh.

== Role in the 1857 rebellion ==
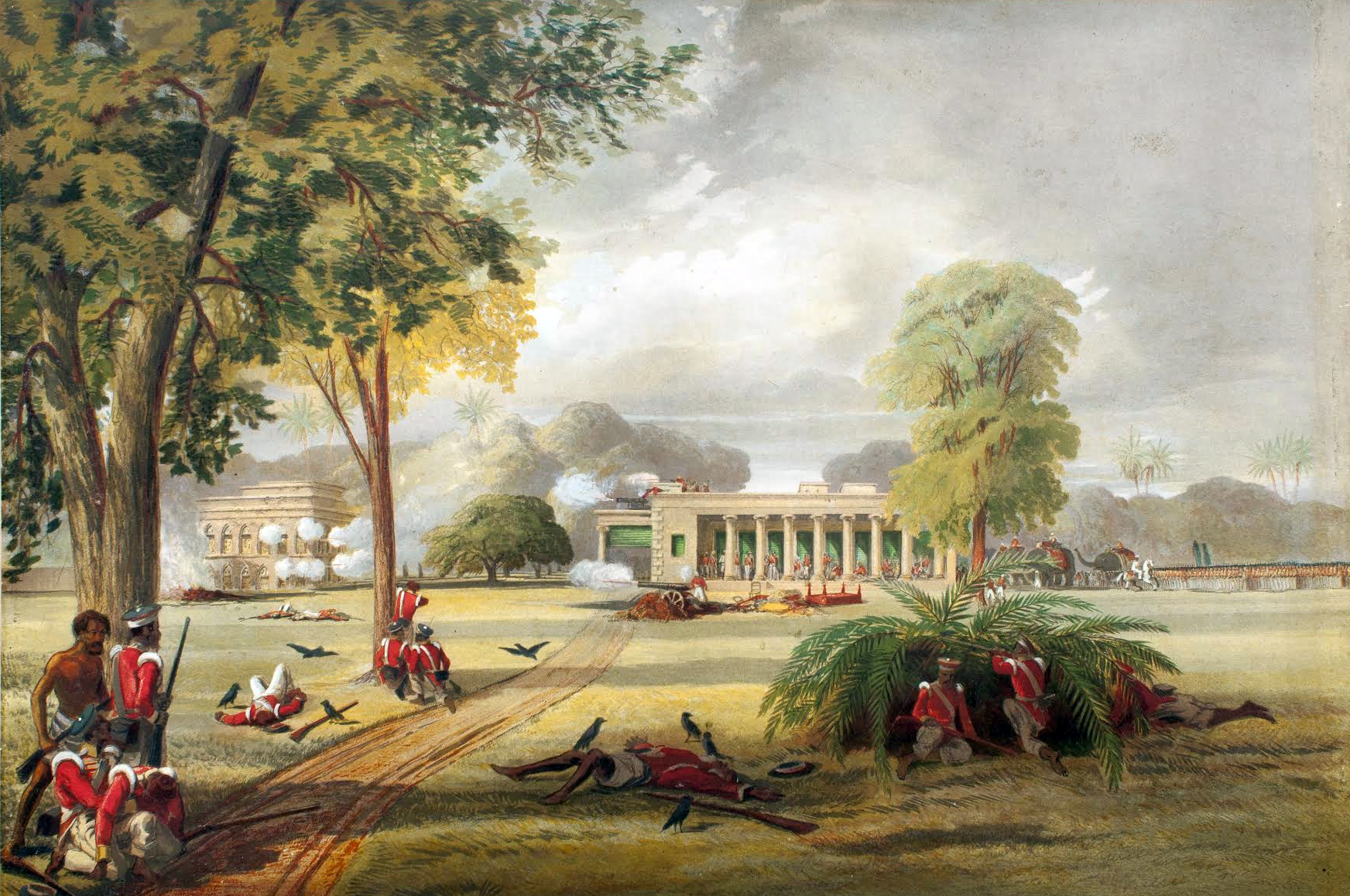
Picture of the Siege of Arrah in which Babu Amar Singh was part of the attacking forces

Babu Amar Singh originally assisted in his brothers campaign including the infamous Siege of Arrah.

After the death of Babu Kunwar Singh on 26 April 1858, Babu Amar Singh became the chief of the army and despite heavy odds, continued the struggle and for a considerable time ran a parallel government in the district of Shahabad. Four days after the death of his brother, he heard reports about British tax collectors in Arrah. He subsequently led an attack on them and defeated them. He was assisted by his commander-in-chief, Hare Krishna Singh.

A soldier who served Amar Singh and was captured in 1858 gave some details about his forces. He stated that after Amar Singh retreated into the hills, he had around 400 cavalry-men and six guns. The guns were obtained from a mechanic in Calcutta who served Amar Singh directly. The force also had cannonballs that were manufactured in Jagdispur with lead they obtained from raids on British boats. Amar Singh was also planning to join his force with fellow rebel leader Nana Sahib.

One 6 June 1858, Amar Singh and his force of 2000 sepoys and 500 sawars arrived in the village of Gahmar in Ghazipur near the border with Bihar. The Sakarwar Rajput rebels from this region, under the leadership of Meghar Singh, were keen for Amar Singh's support and a letter was composed in a village requesting his help. Amar Singh accepted their request. Meghar Singh personally presented Amar Singh with a nazrana or gift worth Rs 20,000. They exchanged supplies and Amar Singh left Gahmar on 10 June. Among the motivations for this alliance were the marital ties shared between the Sakarwars and the Ujjainiyas.

In October 1859, after subsequent guerilla skirmishes with the British, Amar Singh fled with other rebel leaders to the Nepal Terai. He presumably went into hiding after this and disappeared before being captured later that same year and dying in prison.
