= Dumraon =

- City
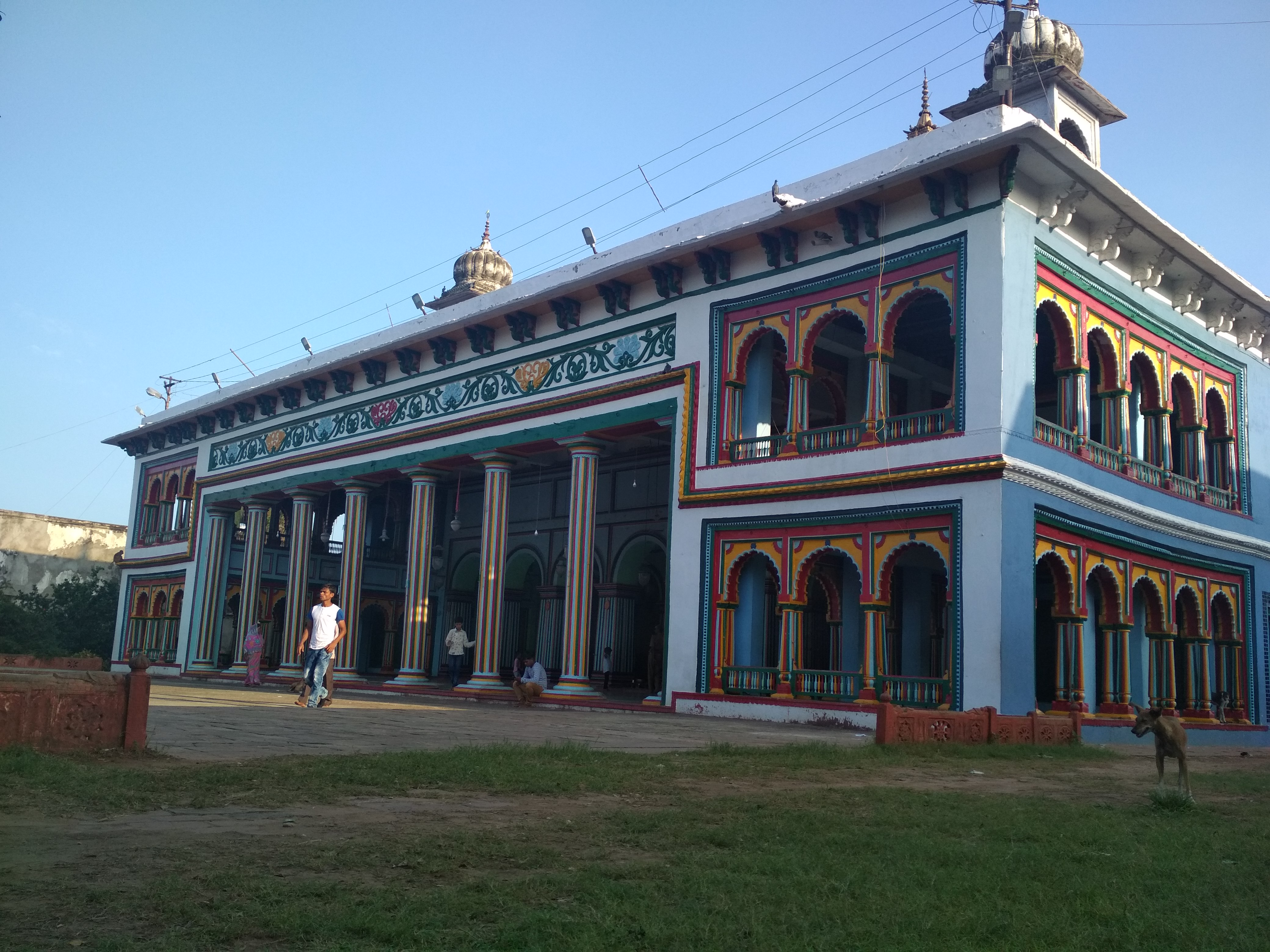
- Bihari Ji temple

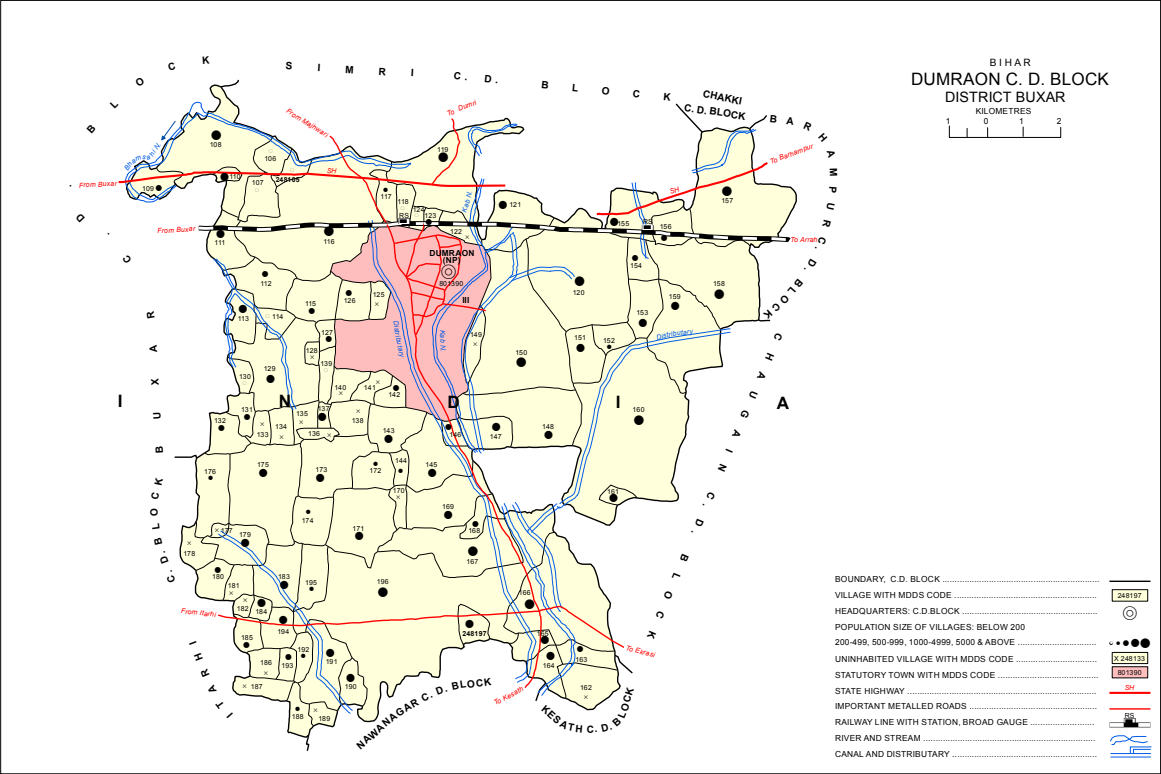
- Map of Dumraon block
- Country: India
- State: Bihar
- District: Buxar
- Founder: Raja Horil Singh
- Elevation: 61 m (200 ft)

Population (2020)
  - Total: 200,000
- PIN: 802119
- Area code: 06323
- Vehicle registration: BR-44

Dumraon (also spelled as Doomraon) is a town, near Buxar city and nagar parishad corresponding community development block in Buxar district in the Indian state of Bihar. Historically, it was the capital of the Dumraon Raj. It's a home to the Dumraon Gharanas known for dhrupad.

== Geography ==
Dumraon is located at 25.55°N 84.15°E at an average elevation of 61 metres (200 feet).

== History ==
It was the capital of the Dumraon Raj. Dumraon Raj was a zamindari state during British era. The town was originally founded by Raja Horil Singh following the division of erstwhile territory of Bhojpur. It is also known as "Horilnagar". During the time of Indian independence, Dumraon Raj covered an area of 2,330 km^{2} which stretched from Buxar district in west Bihar to Ballia district in the Purvanchal region of Uttar Pradesh. In Ballia district, Dumraon Raj covered rights of more than 70 villages which are located on the banks of the Ganga river. The nephews of Raja Horil Singh, Babu Buddh Singh and Raja Udwant Singh ruled the principalities at Buxar and Jagdishpur.

Dumraon was formally constituted as a municipality in 1877; during the late 1800s, the town was a producer and exporter of sugar.

The famous Bismillah Khan was born in Dumraon. His father was a court musician employed in the court of the Maharaja of Dumraon.

== Demographics ==
As of 2011 India census, Dumraon had a population of 53,618 as per census of 2011 Out of which 28,498 are males while 25,120 are females. The Average Sex Ratio of Dumraon is 881. Males constitute 53% of the population. Dumraon has an average literacy rate of 71.6% lower than the national average by 2.64%: male literacy is 66.6% and, female literacy is 53.4% . In Dumraon, 16% of the population is under 6 years of age. Religion-wise population of Dumraon is as follows: there are 83.85% Hindu, 15.94 Muslim, 0.11% Christian, 0.01% Buddhist and 0.07% non-religion.

Historical populations
Year	Pop.	±%
1911	15,042	—
1921	14,132	−6.0%
1931	14,421	+2.0%
1941	16,636	+15.4%
1951	16,605	−0.2%
1961	19,662	+18.4%
1971	22,969	+16.8%
1981	29,560	+28.7%
1991	35,068	+18.6%
2001	45,806	+30.6%
2011	53,618	+17.1%
"District Census Handbook Part A - Buxar" (PDF). Census of India. p. 731.

== Popular references ==
Ustad Bismillah Khan (21 March 1916 – 21 August 2006) (born as Qamaruddin Khan), often referred to by the honorific title Ustad, was an Indian musician credited with popularizing the shehnai, a subcontinental wind instrument of the oboe class. Khan was born on 21 March 1916 in a family of traditional Muslim musicians in Bhirung Raut Ki Gali, Dumraon, in what is now the eastern Indian state of Bihar, as the second son of Paigambar Baksh Khan and Mitthan. He was awarded India's highest civilian honour, the Bharat Ratna, in 2001, becoming the third classical musician after M. S. Subbulakshmi and Ravi Shankar to be accorded this distinction.

The Former Princely State also finds mention and is the setting for the second half of the popular novel Half Girlfriend by Chetan Bhagat where the protagonist Madhav Jha played by Arjun Kapoor is the Prince of the former Princely state Dumraon.

== Railways ==
Dumraon Railway Station is located in between Ara and Buxar Railway Station on the Howrah–Delhi main line via Patna–Mughalsarai section main line. The Railway code for Dumraon is DURE.

== Villages ==
Besides the city of Dumraon itself, there are 93 villages in Dumraon block. Of these, 73 are inhabited and 20 are uninhabited. As of 2011, the total population of these villages was 179,064, in 28,898 households.

Village name	Total land area (hectares)	Population (in 2011)
Belamohan	56	38
Kunriya	60.8	9
Lohsar	111	29
Chilhari	517.2	6,207
Chanda	113	547
Partap Sagar	32	2,243
Kusalpur	133	2,055
Kulhawa	183.3	898
Suraundha	111.4	1,846
Naudiha	72.4	144
Samhar	164.2	975
Bhojpur Kadim	959	18,243
Mohammadpur	79	222
Hakimpur	55	110
Bhojpur Jadid	486.4	17,088
Chhatanwar	792	6,310
Rampur	218.9	1,591
Rasulpur	103.6	0
Hathelipur	20.2	880
Mustafapur	38.4	73
Puraini	55.4	0
Bankat	100	711
Hata	41.3	587
Marwatia	26.7	0
Nenuan	432.6	3,099
Bharkhara	44.1	176
Kudria	72.1	505
Mungasi	127.4	562
Kam Karahi	47.3	0
Sahipur	67.6	0
Sundarpur	55.9	0
Bharkunria	28.7	0
Piria	95.9	1,348
Uderampur	16	0
Mohanpur	63.6	111
Churamanpur	71.6	0
Sagarpur	54	0
Misraulia	53.4	557
Rajdiha	168.8	1,977
Tulshipur	34.8	213
Karuaj	207.2	1,904
Nikhura	43.3	528
Araila	115	1,020
Lakhan Dehra	441.6	3,149
Bhikha Bandh	141.6	0
Nandan	806.9	6,894
Amthua	142.4	2,204
Sirampur	85.8	402
Sarora	133.6	1,295
Dheka	80.1	693
Turiganj	215.7	3,529
Kumbhi	97.6	828
Noaon	716.7	5,698
Sowan	528	8,064
Rehiya	418.9	4,129
Ariyawon	1,201.9	9,978
Dubkhi	53.4	1,247
Usrauliya	127.4	0
Basgitiya	54.3	791
Kachainiya	145.3	1,601
Dakhinawan	100.4	1,557
Kuransarae	589.2	9,714
Mugaon	426.6	5,576
Phogu Tola	68.4	918
Kopwa	327.9	3,771
Dihri	46.9	0
Kashia	348.8	3,274
Sikta	96	446
Ekauni	307.1	2,640
Khairahi	136.3	477
Athaon	496.2	4,197
Dahigana	194.3	384
Saro Dih	13	0
Udhopur	88.3	0
Chuar	173.9	1,522
Bairia	81	724
Dhangain	60.7	0
Basgitia	36.8	0
Lahana	201.2	1,409
Kamdharpur	40.1	1,197
Harni Chatti	68.9	529
Mirchi	81.7	0
Asapur	79	0
Misraulia	66	243
Khairahi	46.1	0
Parmanpur	72.9	1,132
Kanjharua	229.4	2,099
Pipri	57.4	436
Niranjanpur	48.1	925
Adpha	100.3	1,162
Marsara	123.4	390
Mathila	1,672.2	8,823
Nazirganj	70	2,221 udiyanganj उड़ियानगंज
