= Kunwar Dhir =

Kunwar Dhir Singh was an Ujjainya Parmar Rajput chieftain and rebel who fought against the Mughal Empire in Bihar during the 17th century. He was the son of Bikram Shahi of Piru pargana in Bhojpur district.

== Rebellion against the Mughals ==
He allied himself with neighbouring chieftain called Rudra Singh and together they carried out multiple raids in the area around Tekari and Bhojpur. The subedar of Bihar, Safi Khan, realised how strong they were together and worked to break their alliance. He approached Rudra Singh and promised him that the rank and title that he previously held would be restored as long as he apologised for his rebellion and made a substantial payment to the Mughal authorities. Rudra Singh agreed and ended up betraying Kunwar Dhir and the latter ended up going into hiding.

Kunwar Dhir and his forces eventually reappeared in 1682 and captured some villages in West Champaran district. Rudra Singh was then ordered by the subedar to recapture the lost territory for the Mughals and he marched to Champaran with a strong contingent and defeated Kunwar Dhir. However, Kunwar Dhir reappeared in 1683 and defeated the combined forces of Rudra Singh and Aqidat Khan. Emboldened by this victory, Kunwar Dhir made preparations to attack Ara which was controlled by the faujdar, Aqidat Khan. When this was discovered, an imperial farman was issued to local Mughal allies to render all possible help to Aqidat Khan. Realising this, Kunwar Dhir fled to Gorakhpur where he established a new stronghold in Barhaj. In 1685 he began plundering in imperial territories again. However, he realised that Rudra Singh with the support of the Mughals would have eventually suppressed him so he hatched a conspiracy to poison him and succeeded.

Kunwar Dhir died in 1712 and his son, Sudhist Narayan continued his rebellion.
