= Kinwar =

Kinwar is a clan whose members belong to the Rajput caste. The Rajput's members principally reside in the states of Bihar and Eastern Uttar Pradesh. A particularly large population of Kinwar Rajputs can be found in Ballia district.The founders of the Kharagpur Raj principality in Bihar were Kinwar Kshatriya.
