= Khawaspur Diara urf Topra =

Village in Bihar, India

- Village
- Location within Bihar Location within India
- Coordinates: 25°22′11″N 87°21′35″E
- Country: India
- State: Bihar
- District: Bhagalpur
- Block: Pirpainti

Government
  - Type: Sarpanch

Area
  - Total: 63.03 km^{2} (24.34 sq mi)
- Elevation: 34 m (112 ft)

Population (2011)
  - Total: 35,545
  - Density: 563.9/km^{2} (1,461/sq mi)

Languages
  - Local: Hindi, Angika
- Time zone: UTC+5:30 (IST)
- PIN: 813209
- STD code: 06429
- Vehicle registration: BR-10

Khawaspur Diara urf Topra is a large village in Bihar, India, near the northern edge of Bhagalpur District. The village is located approximately 40 kilometres northeast of the district seat Bhagalpur, and is surrounded by the settlements of Nandi Gobind urf Chulia, Khawaspur Milik and Sangalbahita. In the 2011 census, it had a population of 35,545.

== Geography ==
Khawaspur Diara urf Topra lies on the south bank of the Ganges River, northwest of the town Pirpainti. It has a total area of 6303 hectares.

== Demographics ==
As of the 2011 census, Khawaspur Diara urf Topra had a total population of 35,545, of which 19,183 (53.97%) were male and 16,362 (46.03%) were female. Working population made up 37.42% of the total population, of which 8,594 were male and 4,708 were female. The literacy rate was 39.49%, with 9,064 of the male residents and 4,972 of the female residents being literate.
