= Chhatanwar =

Coordinates: 25°33′56″N 84°12′21″E

Chhatanwar is a village located in Dumraon block of Buxar district, Bihar. It is situated in the western region of the Bihar. Bhojpuri is the language spoken in the village. It is situated 6 km from sub-district headquarter Dumraon and 24 km from district headquarter Buxar. As per 2009 stats, Chhatanwar village is also a gram panchayat.

The total geographical area of village is 792 hectares. Chhatanwar has a total population of 6,310 people. As per census of 2011, there are about 854 houses in Chhatanwar village. There are 3328 males and 2982 females out of 6310 people. Dumraon is the nearest town to Chhatanwar, approximately 6 km away. The nearest railway station is Twining Ganj located at a distance of 3 km from village.

Schedule Caste (SC) constitutes 9.75% while Schedule Tribe (ST) are 2.25% of total population in Chhatanwar village. As per census 2011, literacy rate of Chhatanwar village is 71.30% compared to 61.80% of Bihar. In Chhatanwar, Male literacy stands at 85.20% while female literacy rate is 55.69%.
