= Ujjainiya =

Rajput Clan

The Ujjainiya Parmār (also spelled as Ujjaini or simply Ujjainiya) are a Rajput clan that inhabits the Bhojpur region in the state of Bihar and Uttar Pradesh. They were an offshoot of the Parmara Rajputs that claims Agnivanshi descent.

They are considered to have played a prominent role in the political history of medieval Bihar with many of their strongholds being established in the erstwhile Shahabad district of West Bihar, the most notable of which are Dumraon Raj and Jagdispur. Their oral tradition is contained within a 19th-century book called the Tawarikh-i-Ujjainiya. According to this, they trace their ancestry to Ujjain, Madhya Pradesh where the Parmar Rajput kings ruled. After settling in Bihar, the locals started to refer to them as Ujjainiya. They call themselves Ujjainiya Parmars.

== Origins ==
Certainly by the 17th century, as documented in a text that they consider to record their history, and perhaps as early as the 14th century, the Ujjainiya Parmar Rajputs believed themselves to be related to the royal family of Ujjain in Malwa, Madhya Pradesh. The oral tradition of the Ujjaniya, as written in the 19th century in a book called Tawarikh-i-Ujjaniya, makes a similar claim of a royal relationship. This document contains a family tree which claims to directly link the Paramara King, The great Bhoja Raj Parmar to certain Ujjainiya chieftains in Bihar.

By the 17th century, the Ujjainiyas were recognised as Parmar Rajputs by the Rajputs of Rajasthan and were allowed a place in the Rajasthani bardic khyat.

== History ==
=== Arrival in Bihar and war with the Cheros ===
During the 14th century, the Ujjainiyas who were under the leadership of Hunkar Singh, came into conflict with the Chero dynasty who were the traditional rulers of much of Bihar and Jharkhand. In the ensuing battles, both sides suffered many casualties with the Cheros losing more than 20,000 men however eventually the Chero rulers were expelled from Western Bihar and retreated to Palamau in modern-day Jharkhand. The conflict between the Ujjainiyas and the Cheros lasted for centuries as many Cheros who remained resented the Ujjainiyas and continued to rebel against them by undertaking a protracted guerilla campaign against them.

=== Conflict with the Jaunpur Sultanate ===
Once the Ujjainiyas established sway over Western Bihar, they came into conflict with the Jaunpur Sultanate which lasted for more than 100 years. The Ujjainiyas responded to the Jaunpur Sultan, Malik Sarwar disturbing Brahmins in their prayers. The Ujjainiya chieftain, Raja Harraj was initially successful in protecting these Brahmins and defeating the forces of Malik Sarwar however the Ujjainiyas were defeated in subsequent battles and retreated in the forests and resort to guerrilla warfare.

=== Battle of Surajgarha ===
The Ujjainiyas under the leadership of Raja Gajpati helped Sher Shah Suri in the battle of Surajgarha against the Muslim rulers of Bengal who at the time were a major regional power. Raja Gajpati handpicked 2000 of his best men and was able to help Sher Shah Suri in achieving victory. General Ibrahim Khan was killed by Raja Gajpati and all the camp equipments, elephants and artillery pieces of the Bengal army fell into the hands of Ujjainiyas. In return for their help the Ujjainiyas were entitled to any spoils of war they have found.

== Role in military labour ==
The Ujjainiyas played a prominent role in the recruitment of Purbiya mercenary soldiers from Bhojpur for Hindu rulers, the Marathas and the British. For a period, their name was synonymous with the military labour market of Northern India.

== Personalities ==
- Veer Kunwar Singh
- Raja Horil Singh
- Babu Amar Singh
- Kunwar Dhir
- Gajpati Ujjainia

== See also ==
- Ganwaria Rajput
- Babu Saheb
