= Raja Horil Singh =

Raja of Dumraon

Raja of Dumraon
- Reign: 1709 A.D. – 1746 A.D.
- Successor: Raja Chhatadhari Singh
- Born: Mathila Buxar
- Died: 1746; Dumraon
- House: Ujjainiya
- Religion: Hindu

Raja Horil Singh (Hindi: राजा होरिल सिंह) was a ruler of Dumraon belonging to the Ujjainiya dynasty.

He initially had his capital in Mathila Buxar but later shifted his capital to Dumraon. He was notorious for engaging in feuds with his own clansmen and assisting the Mughals in helping to put down their rebellions for which he was rewarded greatly. He is mainly noted for shifting his principality capital to Dumraon. It remained the capital even during the reign of his descendants until Indian independence.
