= Shahabad district =

District of Bihar in India

Coordinates: 25.55°N 84.65°E

Shahabad district (Bhojpuri pronunciation: sāhābāda, 𑂮𑂰𑂯𑂰𑂥𑂰𑂠), headquartered at Arrah, was a historic administrative district in British India. Making up the westernmost part of modern-day Bihar, its territory was defined by the Ganges river to the north and the Son River to the east, which traditionally separated the Bhojpuri-speaking culture of Shahabad from the Magahi culture of Magadh.

In 1972, the district was bifurcated into Bhojpur and Rohtas, which were later subdivided to create the four present-day districts that occupy its former territory.

== Etymology ==
The name Shahabad (Persian: شاه آباد), meaning City of the King or Abode of the King, is said to have been coined by the Mughal emperor Babur in 1529. After a military victory in the region, Babur set up his camp at Arrah and named the town and by extension, the surrounding region, Shahabad to proclaim his dominion.

== Present status and Bhojpur Division (proposed) ==
The districts in erstwhile Shahabad are as follows:

- Bhojpur District headquartered at Arrah
- Rohtas District headquartered at Sasaram
- Kaimur District headquartered at Bhabua
- Buxar District headquartered at Buxar

All four above districts fall under the Patna Division along with Patna and Nalanda District.

== Notable persons ==
- Kamla Persad-Bissessar, Seventh prime minister of Trinidad and Tobago and first woman prime minister of Trinidad and Tobago (great-grandfather is from Shahabad)
- Chacha Ramgoolam, First prime minister and Chief Minister of Mauritius (father from Shahabad)
- Navin Ramgoolam, former prime minister of Mauritius (grandfather from Shahabad)
- Anerood Jugnauth, former prime minister of Mauritius (grandfather is from Shahabad)
- Pravind Jugnauth, present prime minister of Mauritius (great-grandfather is from Shahabad)
- Sher Shah Suri, founder of Sur Dynasty who had built Grand Trunk Road
- Ustad Bismillah Khan, shehnai maestro and recipient of Bharat Ratna
- Babu Jagjivan Ram, fourth deputy PM and longest-serving union minister of India
- Meira Kumar, retd. Indian Foreign Service (IFS) officer and first woman Lok Sabha speaker.
- Ravindra Kishore Sinha, former Rajya Sabha MP, Indian billionaire
- Ram Subhag Singh, Railway Minister of India from 14 February 1969 to 4 November 1969
- Bhuvaneshwar Prasad Sinha, sixth chief justice of India
- Bisheshwar Prasad Singh, former chief justice of Bombay High Court
- Anil Sinha, Indian Police Service (IPS) officer and current director of CBI
- Srimat Pandey, Indian Administrative Service (IAS) officer 1984 batch. Former principal secretary of Rajasthan.
- Bindeshwari Dubey, 21st chief minister of Bihar and former union minister of India
- Anant Sharma, former union minister, and Governor of Punjab and West Bengal state
- Prashant Kishor, a political strategist who led the NDA to victory in the 2014 elections
- Vinay Pathak, Bollywood actor
- Mohd Zama Khan, Member of Legislative Assembly from Chainpur Vidhan sabha and minister of minority affairs in Bihar Government
- Manoj Tiwari, member of Parliament and one of the two Bhojpuri cinema superstars
- Vashishtha Narayan Singh, Indian mathematician and former NASA scientist
- Veer Kunwar Singh, the Indian freedom fighter who fought the British at the age of 80
- Sardar Harihar Singh, former chief minister of Bihar (From Chaungain)
- Abdul Qaiyum Ansari; freedom fighter, president of All India Momin conference through which he fought against Jinnah's two-nation theory, former cabinet minister of Bihar, member of Parliament
- Rajkumar Shahabadi, a film producer from Shahabad who produced Bhojpuri cinema's first film, Ganga Maiyya Tohe Piyari Chadhaibo. Rajkumar Shahabadi, his son, is also a film producer and his granddaughter, Sheena Shahabadi, is an actress.
