= Kunwar Singh =

Leader of the Indian rebellion of 1857

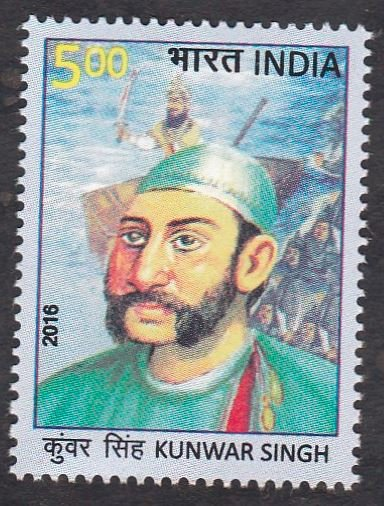
- The India Post commemorative postage stamp for Veer Kunwar Singh issued on December 26, 2016

Raja of Jagdishpur
- Reign: 1857–1858
- Predecessor: Sahabzada Singh
- Successor: Babu Amar Singh
- Born: 13 November 1777; Jagdishpur, Jagdishpur estate
- Died: 26 April 1858 (aged 80); Jagdishpur, Shahabad district, Bengal Presidency, Company India
- Dynasty: Ujjainiya
- Father: Raja Sahabzada Singh
- Mother: Panchratan Kunwar Devi

Veer Kunwar Singh, also known as Babu Kunwar Singh, was a chief organiser of the Indian Rebellion of 1857 from the Bhojpur region of Bihar. He was originally the ruler of Jagdishpur estate. He led a selected band of armed soldiers against the troops under the command of the British East India Company.

== Early life ==
Kunwar Singh was born on 13 November 1777 in Rajput family to Raja Sahabzada Singh and Panchratan Devi, in Jagdishpur in the Indian state of Bihar. He belonged to a cadet branch of the Ujjainiya dynasty which ruled the Jagdishpur principality. A British judicial officer offered a description of Kunwar Singh and described him as "a tall man, about seven feet in height". He went on to describe him as having a broad face with an aquiline nose. In terms of his hobbies, British officials describe him as being a keen huntsman who also enjoyed horse-riding. After his father's death in 1826, Kunwar Singh became the ruler of Jagdishpur. His brothers also got some share and inherited some territory however a dispute arose as to their exact allocation. This dispute was eventually settled and the brothers seemingly returned to having cordial relations.

He married the daughter of Raja Fateh Narayan Singh of the Deo Raj estate who belonged to the Sisodia clan of Rajputs.

== Role in the 1857 rebellion ==
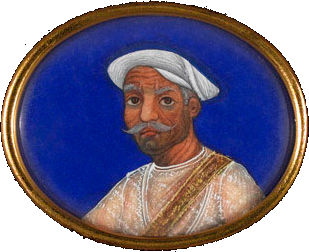
A miniature portrait of Kunwar Singh, watercolour on ivory, c. 1857.

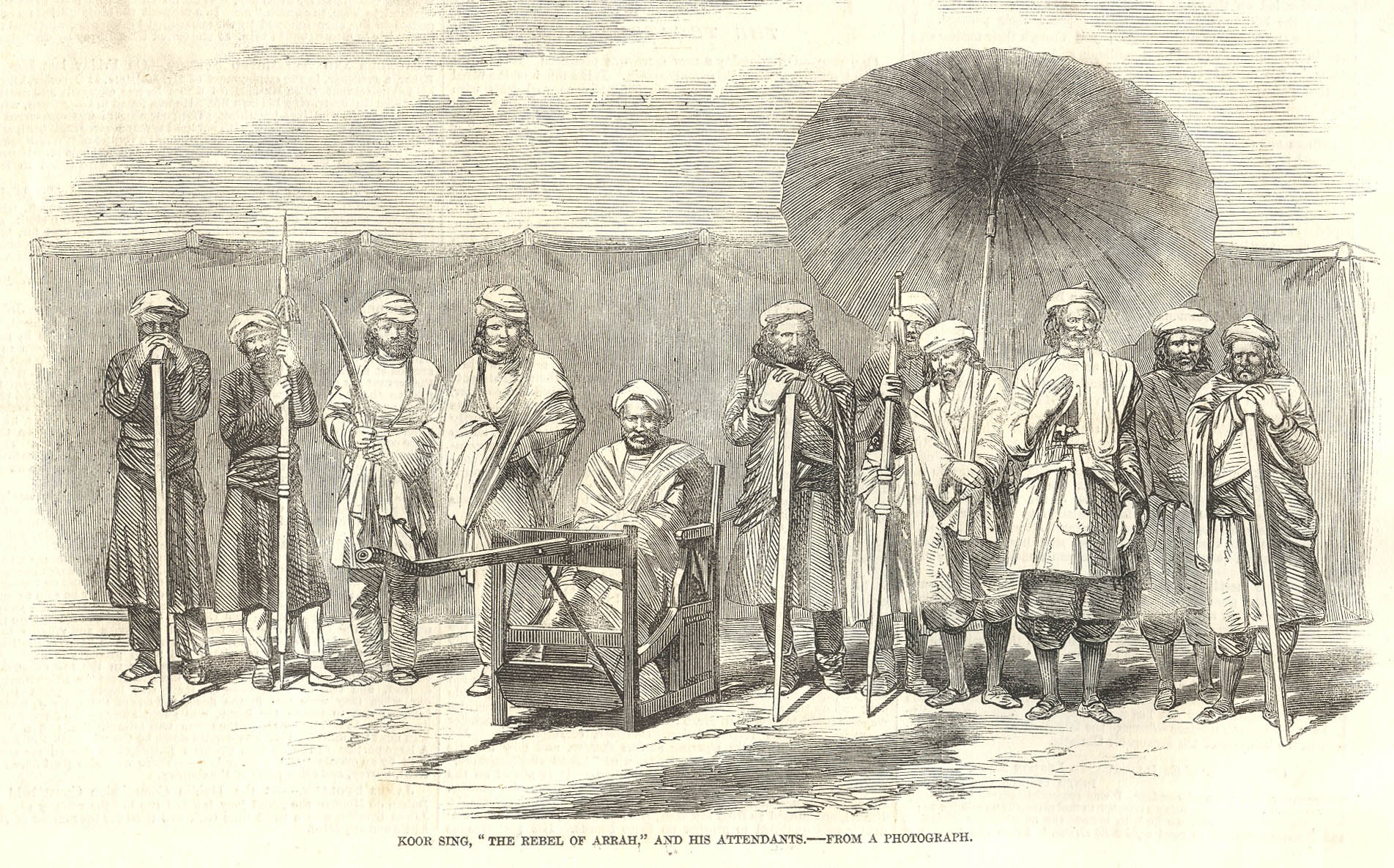
Kunwar Singh and his attendants

Singh led the Indian Rebellion of 1857 in Bihar. He was nearly eighty and in failing health when he was called upon to take up arms. He was assisted by both his brother, Babu Amar Singh and his commander-in-chief, Hare Krishna Singh. Some argue that the latter was the real reason behind Kunwar Singh's initial military success. He was a tough opponent and harried British forces for nearly a year. He was an expert in the art of guerilla warfare. His tactics sometimes left the British puzzled.

Singh assumed command of the soldiers who had revolted at Danapur on 25 July. Two days later he occupied Arrah, the district headquarters. Major Vincent Eyre relieved the town on 3 August, defeated Singh's force and destroyed Jagdishpur. During the rebellion, his army had to cross the Ganges river. The army of Brigadier Douglas began to shoot at their boat. One of the bullets shattered Singh's left wrist. Singh felt that his hand had become useless and that there was the additional risk of infection due to the bullet-shot. He drew his sword and cut off his left hand near the elbow and offered it to the Ganges.

Singh left his ancestral village and reached Lucknow in December 1857 where he met with other rebel leaders. In March 1858, he occupied Azamgarh in North-Western Provinces (Uttar Pradesh) and managed to repel the initial British attempts to take the area. However, he had to leave the place soon. Pursued by Douglas, he retreated towards his home at Arrah. On 23 April, Singh had a victory near Jagdishpur over the force led by Captain Le Grande (pronounced as Le Garde in Hindi). On 26 April 1858 he died in his village. The mantle of the old chief now fell on his brother Amar Singh II, who continued the struggle for a considerable time, running a parallel government in the district of Shahabad. In October 1859, Amar Singh II joined the rebel leaders in the Terai plains of Nepal.

Due to financial difficulties arising from family litigation and his active participation in the 1857 revolt against the British, the management of Kunwar Singh's estate was taken over by the British authorities.

== Contemporary British accounts ==
Sir George Trevelyan, a British statesman and author noted about Kunwar Singh and the battle of Arrah in his book, The Competition Wallah, that:

Two facts may be deduced from the story of these operations - first that the besiegers of the house at Arrah were neither cowards nor bunglers; and the next that it was uncommonly lucky for us that Coer Singh was not forty years younger.

George Bruce Malleson, a 19th-century English officer stationed in India during the rebellion of 1857 stated about Kunwar Singh:

One of the three natives of India thrown up to the surface by the mutiny, who showed any pretensions to the character of a strategist — the others being Tántia Topi and the Oudh Moulvi— Kúnwar Singh had carefully for borne to risk the fortunes of his diminished party which, however favorable might be its commencement, must certainly end in its complete defeat.

== Legacy ==
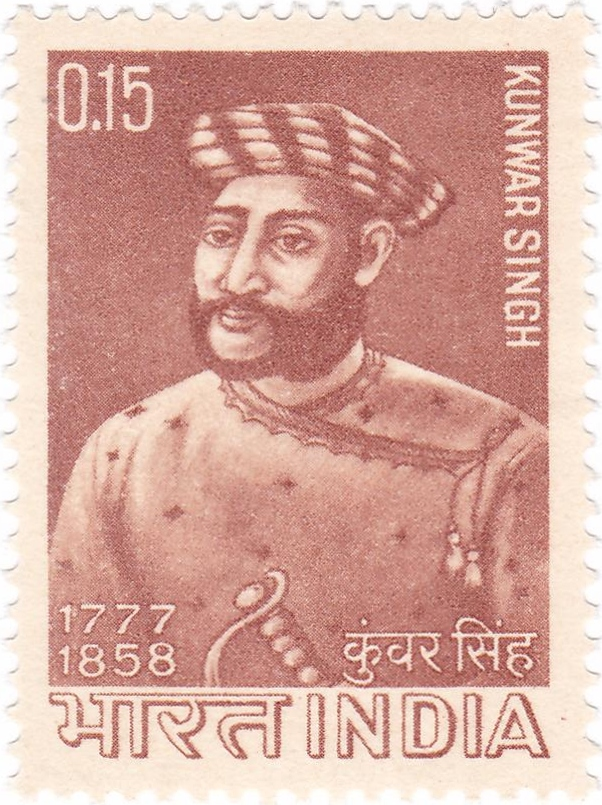
1966 commemorative stamp of Singh

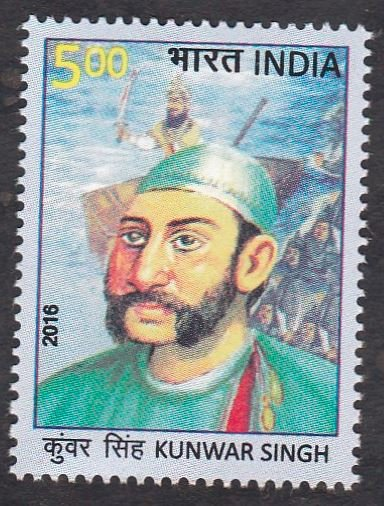
2016 stamp

To honour his contributions to Indian independence, the Government of India issued a commemorative stamp on 23 April 1966. The Government of Bihar established the Veer Kunwar Singh University, Arrah, in 1992.

In 2017, the Veer Kunwar Singh Setu, also known as the Arrah–Chhapra Bridge, was inaugurated to connect north and south Bihar. In 2018, to celebrate 160th anniversary of Kunwar Singh's death, the government of Bihar relocated a statue of him to Hardinge Park. The park was also officially renamed as 'Veer Kunwar Singh Azadi Park'.

Singh is mentioned in several Bhojpuri folk songs, one of which states:

Verses

Ab chhod re firangiya!
Hamar Deswa!
Lutpat kaile tuhun, majwa udaile kailas, des par julum jor.
Sahar gaon luti, phunki, dihiat firangiya,
suni suni Kunwar ke hridaya me lagal agiya!
Ab Chhod re firangiya!
Hamar Deswa!

Translation:
English translation

O foreigners!
Leave our country!
For you have plundered us, enjoyed the luxuries of our country and oppressed our countrymen.
You have plundered, destroyed and burnt our cities and villages.
Kunwar's heart burns to know all this.
O foreigners!
Leave our country!

In the 1970s, a private landlord militia known as the 'Kuer Sena/Kunwar Sena' (Kunwar's Army) was formed by Rajput youth in Bihar to combat naxalite insurgents. It was named after Kunwar Singh.

A play by Jagdish Chandra Mathur titled Vijay Ki Vela (Moment of Victory) is based on the later part of Kunwar Singh's life. He is also mentioned in the poem "Jhansi Ki Rani" by Subhadra Kumari Chauhan.

In April 2022, Indian Home minister Amit Shah announced the installation of a statue commemorating Kunwar Singh at Ara, Bhojpur. About 78,000 national flags were waved by the public as a matter of world record during this announcement.

The Indian Air Force conducted an air show using fighter jets on the occasion of Vijay Divas of Kunwar Singh on 23 April 2025. It was attended by several dignitaries including the Governor of Bihar and Chief Minister of Bihar.

A chapter telling his story and his role in the 1857 revolt was in the NCERT Hindi, grade 7th book "Vasant"

== See also ==
- History of Bihar
- Veer Kunwar Singh Museum
