= Chakwars =

18th century Chieftaincy in Bihar

Chakwar Chieftaincy
- 1718-1730s
- Map showing the extent of Chakwars in the 18th-century Bihar compiled from Prof. Radha Krishna Choudhary's The Chakwars of Begusarai (1952) and History of Muslim rule in Tirhut (1970)
- Status: Zamindari estate under Mughal Empire and later semi-independent under the Nawabs of Bengal
- Capital: Shambho (Begusarai)
- Religion: Hinduism
- Government: Chieftaincy
- Raja
  - c. ?: Chirayu Misir (founder)
  - c. ?–1718: Shivdutta Singh
  - c. 1718–1727: Bakhtawar Singh
  - c. ?–1730: Ruko Bahadur Singh
- Historical era: Early modern period
  - Rise of Bakhtawar Singh: 1718 - 1727
  - Raids on East India Company boats along the Ganges: 1720
  - Invasion of Nawab Alivardi Khan: 1727 - 1730s
Preceded by	Succeeded by
Mughals	Alivardi Khan
- Today part of: India; Bihar; Jharkhand

The Chakwar chieftaincy was a semi-autonomous feudal polity based in modern day Begusarai, Bihar during the early eighteenth century. The Chakwars are a Mool (sub-group) of the Bhumihar community found mainly in Bihar, India. In the 18th century, they amassed military power and controlled large swathes of South Bihar. They were notable for their riverine warfare capabilities and asserted their independence from the Naib Nazim of Bihar Alavardi Khan who later became the Nawab of Bengal. . At its peak, the Chakwar dominion encompassed large parts of the modern day districts of Begusarai, Munger, Sheikhpura, Vaishali, Samastipur, Eastern Patna, Khagaria, Katihar, Gaya and Sahebganj in Bihar and Jharkhand.

== Early Expansion ==
A 1726 CE land Grant document (Bhumidan Patra) written in the Kaithi script, issued by Maharaja Bakhtawar Singh Chakwar of Begusarai,Bihar.

According to Muslim and British sources, the territory of the Chakwar kingdom extended from Rajmahal in the east and Tekari in the west and from Darbhanga in the north to the boundaries of Odisha in the south. The Chakwars began to grow in strength following the disintegration of the Mughal Empire and they asserted independence by issuing land grants with their own signatures and seals. These were issued by various Chakwar kings including Raja Bakhtawar Singh who ruled between 1718 and 1727. The strength of the Chakwars stemmed from the fact that they controlled various important river-routes across the Ganges and was able to extort a large amount of money from European traders. They also carried out raids on neighbouring regions. European sources from 1719 to 1721 note that skirmishes between Europeans and the Chakwars were common and many traders requested increased protection from Chakwar attacks as they controlled the riverine route from Munger to Patna.

== Asserting Independence ==
In 1720 Nasiat (Yar) Khan was made governor of Bihar; it is stated in the available records that he was not able to bring the Chakwars under control and that they remained independent throughout his time in office. Bakhtawar Singh used his own official seal, a procedure which was not in accordance with his being subordinate to Alivardi Khan. In March 1721, accounts from Patna stated that the Chakwars had defeated a body of cavalry sent by the Nawab. After this defeat the Nawab sent 4,000 horsemen against them, but the Chakwars avoided fighting them directly. Because of their strength the East India Company began to send armed escorts with the boats travelling on the Ganges. By 1721 Bakhtawar Singh had been acknowledged as Raja of the Chakwars. The Chakwars were successful in asserting their independence from the Nawab of Bengal. According to East India Company records, the Chakwar chief Bakhtawar Singh who had resisted the Nawab’s forces died in 1730. He was succeeded by his son Ruko Bahadur Singh, then about seventeen years of age.

Raja Ruko Bahadur Singh was the descendant and successor in the Chakwar line after Bakhtwar Singh. In 1730 Kunjal Singh who was the chieftain of Pharkiya pargana was slain by Raja Ruko Bahadur Singh following a series of violent instances for the possession of the pargana. He attempted to continue the resistance against the Nawab but was eventually captured and killed by Alivardi Khan at Pharkiya pargana in 1730.

== End of Autonomy ==
It is said that an official (most probably his Rajpandita ) of Bakhtawar Singh betrayed him and gave out the secret to Alivardi Khan on a promise of Rs. 30/-per month. Company records indicate that following the defeat of the Chakwars by Naib Nazim Alivardi Khan, an annual tribute was imposed and paid for four years. A meeting place was fixed approximately thirty miles from the Chakwar capital at Sambo, where the prince met the Nawab’s officer each year with thirty attendants on either side. According to Holwell, during one such meeting, thirty Chakwar representatives were executed and their heads sent back, while the capital was simultaneously sacked and burnt. Contemporary accounts describe it as an act of treachery.

The former Chakwar ruler Bakhtawar Singh was still alive, contemporary accounts indicate that after subduing several refractory chiefs in Bihar, Naib Nazim Alivardi Khan secured the allegiance of a number of Hindu and Muslim generals, including Bakhtawar Singh. It appears probable that, following his submission, Bakhtawar Singh entered into friendship with Alivardi Khan and assisted him in consolidating power. He is mentioned in the records as an ally of the Nawab who led an expedition against the Raja of Tirhut.
