= Chirand =

- archaeological site
- Location of Chirand in Bihar, India Chirand (Bihar)
- Coordinates: 25°44′27.1828″N 84°49′11.5651″E
- Country: India
- District: Saran district
- Area code: 841211
- ISO 3166 code: IN-BR

Chirand is an archaeological site in the Saran district of Bihar, India, situated on the northern bank of the Ganga River. Evidence of wheat was found. It has a large pre-historic mound which is known for its continuous archaeological record from the Neolithic age (about 2500–1345 BC) to the reign of the Pala dynasty who ruled during the pre-medieval period. The excavations in Chirand have revealed stratified Neolithic, Chalcolithic, and Iron Age settlements, and transitions in human habitation patterns dating from 2500 BC to 30 AD.

The river Ghaghara joins Ganga a short distance away from the village, near Revelganj. The Sone River also joins Ganga about a few kilometres away from Chirand. About 2.5 kilometres (1.6 mi) to the north of the mound there is a dry river bed which is inferred as one of the meandering dry loops of the Gandaki River. Thus, there are four rivers in the vicinity of Chirand. The village has undergone erosion due to which the mound abutting the Ganga River bank is exposed, revealing brick features and potsherds. On the top of the mound there is a mosque, which was built by Sultan Abul Muzaffar Hussain Shah of Bengal in 1503 AD. This mosque reveals ruins of pilasters of Hindu temples.

Chirand is located 14 kilometres (8.7 mi) from Chhapra, the district headquarters in the state of Bihar. The Archaeological Survey of India controls about 0.5 square kilometres (0.19 sq mi) of the area of the village.

== Climate ==
The average annual rainfall in the area is 125 centimetres (49 in). Much of the rainfall occurs from June to September when the monsoons tend to start. The Ganga River tends to flow beyond capacity causing flooding and deposition of alluvium in the adjoining area.

=== River erosion ===
Part of the village, including about 10 metres (33 ft) of the mound, have been subject to submergence and river erosion caused by the Ganga river. The Nonia tola in the village was in imminent danger of getting submerged. In 2010, protection of the part of the village exposed to erosion was envisaged by way of stone pitching.

== Demography ==
The Chirand village, as per 2011 census, has a population of 2971 comprising 520 families. The male population is 1600 while that of females is 1371. Literacy rate is 61.09 % of the village compared to 61.80 % of the state.

== History ==
The Pal dynasty ruled the region that included Chirand during the medieval period. Ananda, a disciple of Buddha, died in Chirand. King Mayurdhwaj of the Chero dynasty ruled from Chirand. W.W. Hunter, a historian known for publishing nine volumes of The Imperial Gazetteer of India, has recorded an account of this village which he visited in 1871.

The Bihar State Directorate of Archaeology conducted excavations at the Chirand mound 1962–63 and returned for more 1970–71. The mound is 1 kilometre (0.62 mi) in length. The Neolithic deposits uncovered a layer of 3.5 metres (11 ft) thickness. The civilisation includes area in India and South Asia that dates back to the Neolithic age according to archaeological finds from this village mound and four other locations (Note: Burzahom in Kashmir, Bhimbetka caves in Madhya Pradesh, Ayad Valley civilisation in Rajasthan, and Brahmagiri in Karnataka) in India.

Chirand Neolithic group occupied the plains, while their contemporaries inhabited the plateaus and hills. The occupational categorisation in Chirand covers three periods – Period I Neolithic (2500–1345 BC), Period II Chalcolithic (1600 B.C) and Period III Iron Age. Carbon dating of the top layer of the Neolithiic period dates the layer between 1910 BC and 1600 BC. The lowest level of the finds date to 200 BC.

=== Economy ===
Neolithic people experienced an economy that included hunting, gathering, fishing and animal rearing. Paddy husk impressions in some potsherds indicate Neolithic involvement in cultivating rice and cereals such as wheat, moong, masoor, and barley. Both cultivated and wild rice was harvested during summer and again during winter. The wild forms of rice are Oryza rifipogon and Oryza perennis, from which Oryza sativa (Asian rice) originated.

== Archaeological finds ==
The archaeological finds in Chirand are from a Neolithic deposit of 3.5 metres (11 ft) thickness, a Chalcolithic layer 5.5 metres (18 ft) thick and iron age formation of 2.45 metres (8 ft 0 in) thickness. Copper was used during the Chalcolithic period, while iron was found in the upper strata. A cache of 88 Kushan period coins were unearthed at the site.

=== Animals ===
Analysis of antiquities related to skeletal remains revealed 12 species of domesticated and wild animals: cattle, buffaloes (Bubalisbubalis linn), sheep (Ovis aries), cheetal (Axis axis), barasinga, pig, elephant, rhinoceros, cheetal (Axis axia), dog, a carp and two types of turtles. Bones of birds and fish were also found. Faunal finds indicate that the area was forested over an undulating topography.

=== Pottery ===
25,000 potsherds excavated from Chirand are grouped according to the Period II Neolithic pottery appearing more refined than the Period I pottery, all from smoothed clay mixed with mica. Most of the pottery was hand made. Some vessels were made by turn table or dabbing. Half of the potsherds are red ware and half are black and red ware from different shapes and sizes of vases, bowls, and knobbed pottery.

Pot wares in varying designs in post-firing painting technique in ochre colour, generally of grey ware and few in red-ware were also found. The Chalcolithic pottery unearthed at the site are of black and red ware pots and pans.

=== Housing ===
Neolithic people lived in circular wattle and daub huts made of mud and reeds with rammed floors. Earlier hut floors were built below ground level, later hut floors were built at ground level.

Hearths and oblong shaped ovens were found in a semicircular hut. The white colour of the soil around the hearth and the ovens found at the site pointed to animal meat roasted in the ovens, likely for community feeding. Rice was a staple food. Mud boundary walls of houses were traced. Burnt chunks of clay with reed or bamboo impressions suggest that houses were destroyed by fire. Houses were larger in size in the Chalcolithic period compared to the Neolithic period, made of reeds and bamboo with mud plaster and flooring of fired earth. A circular hearth and a few post-holes were also found.

The Neolithic stone implements of celts were found. Axes found were made of quartzite, basalt and granite. The finds included nine types of microliths. Waste flakes found in the area indicate prevalence of the process of manufacture in a well established microlithic industry in the area that included chert, chalcedony, agate and jasper, derived from the dry river bed of the Son river. The final products in the collection are stone discs in long, cylindrical and triangular shapes.

=== Crafts ===
Pendants, ear-rings, bangles, discs and combs from the Neolithic period were found. 400 bone tools, mostly used for hunting, made from antler and long bones of deer and cattle were found in Chirand and at Burzahom from Period II and Period III. Terracotta figurines included humped bulls, birds, snakes, and human female figurines. The snake figures are indicative of existence of Naga cult among the Neolithic people. The human female figurines possibly relate to either a mother goddess, a goddess of fertility, or both. Ornaments made from tortoise and ivory were also found. A painted motif of the sacred peepal leaf (Ficus religiosa) was found. A foot stand of large sarcophagus indicates mortuary rites of the Neolithic people.

== Celebrations ==
=== Fair ===
An annual fair is held in Chirand during the last day of the month of Kartik (October–November) at a location known as Chyavana-asrama.

=== Festival ===
The state government proposed an annual festival titled 'Chirand Mahotsava' with the support of Chirand Vikas Parishad.

=== Theme park ===
A theme park depicting the different civilisations of Chirand is currently being planned.

== Bibliography ==
- Gopal, Lallanji; Srivastava (2008). History of Agriculture in India, Up to C. 1200 A.D. Concept Publishing Company. ISBN 978-81-8069-521-6.
- Peregrine, Peter N.; Ember, Melvin (2003). Encyclopedia of Prehistory: Volume 8: South and Southwest Asia. Springer Science & Business Media. ISBN 978-0-306-46262-7.
- Sahu, Bhairabi Prasad (1988). From Hunters to Breeders: Faunal Background of Early India. Anamika Prakashan. ISBN 978-81-85150-06-2.
- Singh, Upinder (2008). A History of Ancient and Early Medieval India: From the Stone Age to the 12th Century. Pearson Education India. ISBN 978-81-317-1120-0.
- Sinha, Atul K. (2009). Approaches to History, Culture, Art and Archeology: Essays in the Honour of Professor Om Prakash. Anamika. ISBN 978-81-7975-248-7.
