= Telhara monastery =

Telhara
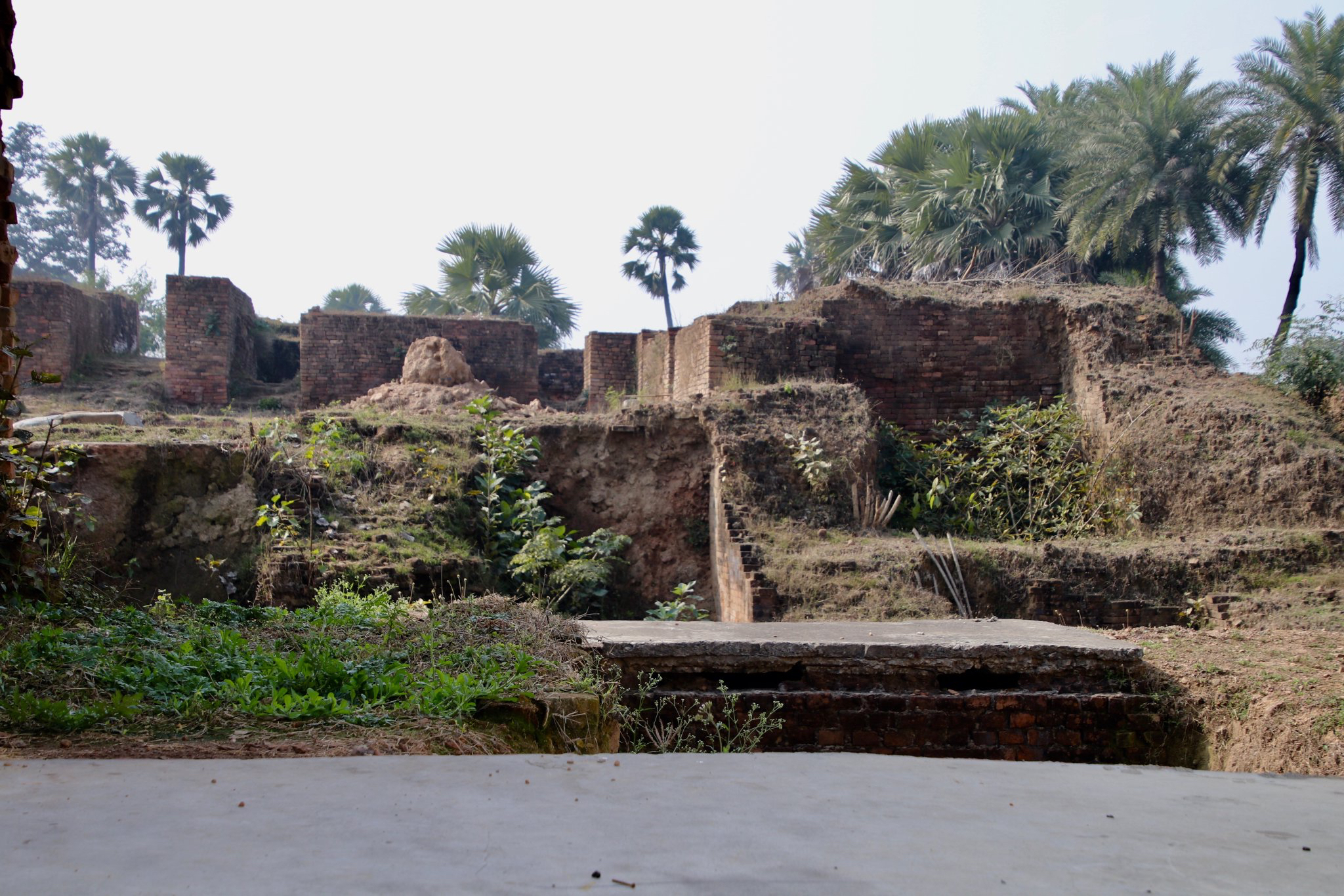

- Site of Telhara Telhara monastery (Bihar)
- 25.226334°N 85.181587°E
- Location: Telhara, Nalanda district
- Nearest city: Bihar Sharif

History
- Built: 1st-century CE

Site notes
- Governing body: Archaeological Survey of India

Telhara (formerly known as Telāḍhaka) was a Buddhist monastic establishment in Nalanda district of Bihar, India dating back to the 1st-century CE and active till at least the 12th-century CE. It is notable as it has been mentioned in the travelogues of Chinese monks including Xuanzang.

== History ==
It has been mentioned as Teladhaka in the writings of the Chinese traveller Hiuen Tsang, who visited the place in the 7th century CE. It is mentioned in an inscription found at Nālandā which mentions a temple restored by a man named Bālāditya, a Jyāvisa of Telāḍhaka who had emigrated from Kauśāmbī, in the eleventh year of Mahipala Deva. Xuanzang describes the monastery as belonging to followers of the Mahayana and having around one thousand monks under a chief monk named Prajnābhadra who was well-renowned. Another Tang-era Chinese traveller, Yijing also visited Telhara and mentioned it being two yojana away from Nalanda and also mentioned the name of a scholar named Jñānacandra who resided there.

A recently discovered inscription stone inscription confirms that the Pithipatis of Magadha donated land to the monastic community of Telhara. It has also been mentioned in the Ain-i-Akbari as Tiladah, and is shown as one of the 46 mahals (administrative units) of the Bihar sarkar. Telhara was shown as a pargana in the maps prepared by the East India Company administration during 1842–45.

The ruins of Telhara were mentioned in an 1872 letter by A. M. Broadley, the then Magistrate of Nalanda. Broadley noted that a large number of stone and metal images were often found during the digging of graves at the top of one of the mounds. Metal images found were melted down. The State Government of Bihar started a new archaeological excavation of the site in December 2009, and later Bihar Virasat Vikas Samiti excavated in 2020-2022 sessions. The work unearthed ancient pottery, antiques, and the remains of a three-storeyed structure mentioned by Hiuen Tsang. Evidence of prayer halls and residential cells in the monastery has been found. The excavation revealed the following chronological layers:

Northern Black Polished Ware (circa 6th century BCE to 2nd Century BCE)

Kushan (2nd Century BCE to 4th century CE)

Gupta (4th to 6th century CE)

Early Medieval (mid 6th century CE to 13th century CE )

Medieval (13th century CE to mid-18th century CE )

Colonial (18th century to mid-20th century CE)

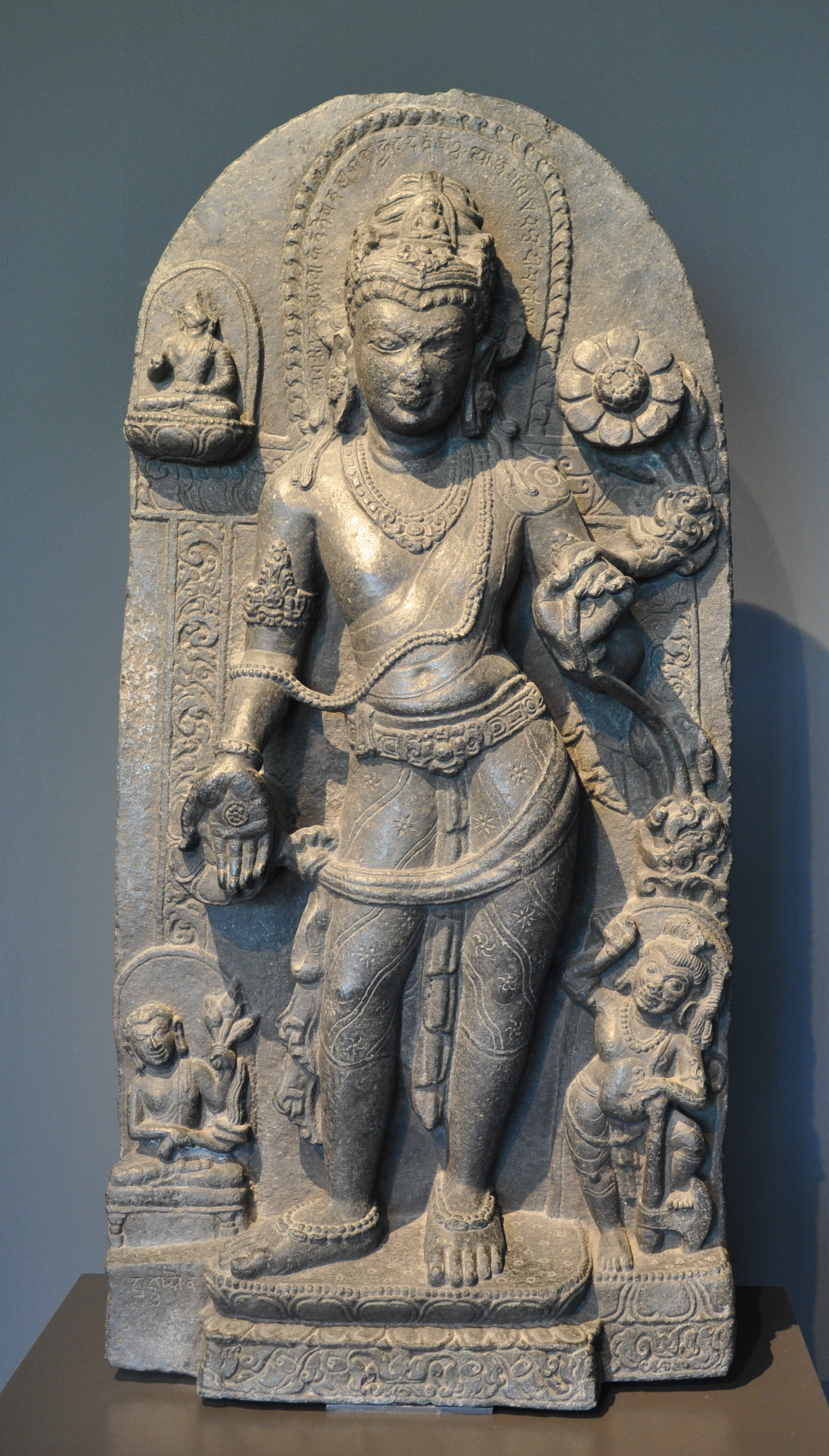
Bodhisattva Lokeshvara from Telhara, now at Rietberg Museum

Several sculptures from the site had been moved to museums during the British Raj. The Indian Museum in Kolkata houses the Maitreya and the twelve-armed Avalokiteswar images from Telhara. A Pala sculpture from the site is present at the Rietberg Museum in Zürich. Telhara has a mosque, which is said to have been built with the materials carried from the ruins of the Buddhist monastery. One pillar contained an inscription that mentions the place-name Telāḍhaka.

Remains of an ancient university (Mahavihara) on the site were unearthed in 2014.

A State Government Museum is under construction to display and store some of the artefacts found.
