= Bihar Vidyapeeth =

- Type: Public
- Established: 6 February 1921
- Founders: Maulana Mazharul Haque
- Affiliations: Bihar State Education Board
- Academic affiliations: National Institute of Open Schooling
- President: Vijay Prakash
- Location: Sadaqat Ashram, Kurji, Patna, Bihar, India
- Campus: 32 acres (13 ha); Urban
- Website: drpspm.biharvidyapeeth.edu.in

Bihar Vidyapeeth is an Indian educational institution founded by Mohandas Karamchand Gandhi on 6 February 1921 but it was seized by the British in 1942. It was started in Patna by Shri Rajendra Prasad and the land was donated by Maulana Mazharul Haque. Its first Institution was opened at Patna-Gaya road presently known as Buddha Marg. It was inaugurated by Mohammad Ali Jauhar and Kasturba Gandhi along with Mahatma Gandhi. In 2022, it is proposed to make Bihar Vidyapeeth a Central University.
