= Manjusha Art =

Indian art form

Manjusha Box used in Snake Festival

Manjushas are an Indian art form. They are temple-shaped boxes comprising eight pillars. They are made of bamboo, jute, and paper. They also contain paintings of Hindu gods and goddesses and other characters. These boxes are used in Bishahari puja, a festival dedicated to the Snake Goddess Bishahari that is celebrated in Bhagalpur and the Anga Pradesh region also known as Angika Belt and nearby regions, India.

== Historical Background ==
Manjusha Art dates back to the 7th century and is considered one of the oldest art forms in Bihar. The term "Manjusha" means "box" in Sanskrit, and traditionally, these were temple-shaped boxes made from bamboo, jute, and paper, adorned with paintings depicting various deities and mythological scenes. These boxes played a significant role during the Bishahari Puja.

== Importance ==
Manjusha Art, also known as Manjusha Kala, is a traditional folk art form originating from the Anga region, particularly Bhagalpur in Bihar, India. Manjusha art or Manjusha Kala is often referred to as Snake paintings by foreigners as swirling snakes in the art depict the central character in Bihula's tale of love and sacrifice. A recent study on Manjusha art provides an excellent example of how this art reflects the history of ancient Anga Mahajanapada.

== Characteristic of Manjusha Art ==
- Three colors are used in Manjusha Art
- In Manjusha Art Borders are very Important.
- Manjusha Art is a Line drawing Art.
- Manjusha Art is a Folk Art.
- Manjusha Art is a Scroll Painting.
- Manjusha Art is completely based on the folklore of Bihula-Bishari.
- In Manjusha Art Characters are displayed as X letter of English Alphabets.
- Major Motifs of Manjusha Art – Snake, Champa Flower, Sun, Moon, Elephant, Turtle, Fish, Maina Bird, Kamal Flower, Kalash Pot, Arrow Bow, ShivLing, Tree etc.
- Major Characters of Manjusha Art – Lord Shiva, Mansa DeVi (Bishari), Bihula, Bala, Hanuman, Chandu Saudagar
- Borders in Manjusha Art – Belpatr, Lehariya, Triangle, Mokha and series of Snakes.

== Artists and awards ==
1. First time in 2012, Late Chakravarty Devi awarded with SITA DEVI AWARD in the field of Manjusha Art.
2. In 2013, Shrimati Nirmala Devi awarded with Bihar Kala Award "SITA DEVI AWARD".
3. In the field of Manjusha Art, First State Award given to Shri Manoj Pandit for his work towards revival of indigenous art form "Manjusha Art". This award is given by Upendra Maharathi Shilp Anusandhan Sansthan & Dept. of Industries, Bihar.
4. On Recommendation of Art, culture and youth affairs department, Bihar; Ministry of Culture (Sanskriti Mantralaya) awarded ‘Manjusha Kala Guru Award’ to Shri Manoj Pandit in 2014.
5. In 2016 - Ulupi Jha is one of the 100 successful women across the country selected by the Union ministry of women and child development on the basis of online voting for her Manjusha painting.

== See also ==
- Angika
- Anga Lipi
- Anga Mahajanapada
- Anga
