= List of churches in Bihar =

This is an incomplete list of Churches and Cathedrals in the Indian state of Bihar.

== List of churches ==
Church name	District	Location	Founded	Denomination	Notes
St Luke's Church	Patna	Danapur Cantonment	1830		
Holy Saviour Church	Arrah	Arrah	1911		
Padri Ki Haveli	Patna	Patna	1713		Oldest church of Bihar
Roman Catholic Church	West Champaran	Bettiah	1746		
St Stephen's Catholic Church	Patna	Danapur Cantonment	1854	Catholic	
Queen of the Apostles' Church	Patna	Kurji	2009		The old church was built in 1890.
St Joseph Pro-Cathedral	Patna	St Joseph’s Convent High School premises, Bankipore	1927	Catholic	
Christ Church	Patna	Bankipore	1852		
