= Richard Vicars Boyle =

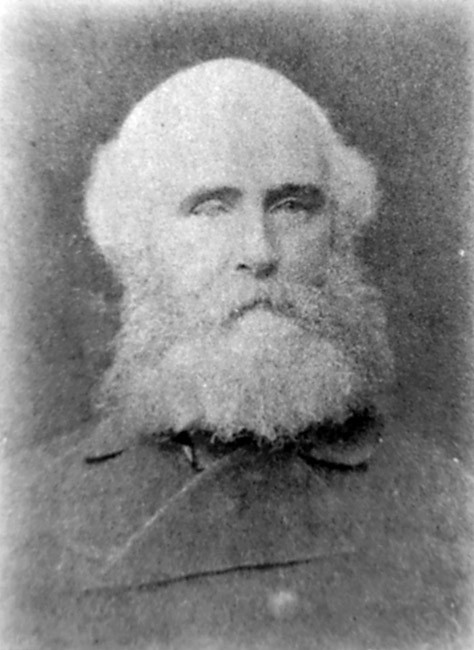

Richard Vicars Boyle CSI (1822–1908) was an Irish civil engineer, noted for his part in the Siege of Arrah in 1857, and as a railway pioneer in Japan.

== Life ==
Born in Dublin on 14 March 1822, he was from a Scots-Irish background, the third son of Vicars Armstrong Boyle; his mother was Sophia, eldest daughter of David Courtney of Dublin. After education at a private school and two years' service on the trigonometrical survey of Ireland he became a pupil to Charles Blacker Vignoles. When he had finished his articles, he was engaged on railway construction in Ireland, at first as assistant to William Dargan, who employed him on the Belfast and Armagh and the Dublin and Drogheda Railways. In 1845, under Sir John Benjamin Macneill, he surveyed and laid out part of the Great Southern and Western Railway, and in 1846–7 was chief engineer for the Longford and Sligo Railway. In the autumn of 1852, he laid out railways and waterworks in Spain as chief assistant to George Willoughby Hemans, son of Felicia Hemans.

In 1853 Boyle was appointed a district engineer on the East Indian Railway. At first he was stationed at Patna, and was then transferred to Arrah.

On the outbreak of the Indian Rebellion of 1857, towards the end of July, troops in the cantonments at Danapur, about twenty-five miles from Arrah, mutinied and deserted, Boyle fortified a detached two-storey house in the same compound as his own private residence, and provisioned it to withstand a siege. Here on Sunday, 26 July, 16 Europeans and about 40 Sikhs took refuge, and the following morning mutineers crossed the Son River and took possession of Arrah. They besieged the house, which held out until sunset on 2 August. Then a relief force from Buxar under Vincent Eyre drew off the rebels.

Boyle was thereupon appointed field-officer to Eyre's force and worked on restoring broken communications and bridges. A few days later he was disabled by a kick from a horse. He was summoned to Calcutta, and while travelling down the River Ganges in the steamer River Bird was wrecked on the Sunderbunds. After a sea-trip to Penang and Singapore for his health, he returned to Arrah early in 1858. For his services, Boyle received the Indian Mutiny Medal and a grant of land near Arrah. In 1868, after leaving the East Indian Railway Company, he became a first-class executive engineer in the Indian public works department, but was then recalled to England by private affairs. He was made C.S.I. in 1869.

From 1872 to 1877 Boyle was in Japan as engineer-in-chief for the Japanese Government Railways, succeeding Edmund Morel. With English assistants he laid out an extensive system of railways in Japan and left about seventy miles of completed line in full working order.

Boyle joined the Institution of Electrical Engineers in 1874. On retiring in 1877, he spent time travelling. He died at 3 Stanhope Terrace, Hyde Park, London on 3 January 1908, and was buried at Kensal Green Cemetery.

== Works ==
To the Institution of Civil Engineers, of which he became an associate on 10 January 1854 and member on 14 Feb. 1860, Boyle presented in 1882 a paper on the Rokugo river bridge, Japan. It spanned the Tama River, joining present-day Ōta, Tokyo to Kawasaki City. After successive floods had damaged bridges at the site, the Tokugawa Shogunate in 1688 had decreed that no replacement should be built, and for nearly two centuries ferries plied across the Tama there. Under Boyle a rail bridge was constructed in 1877, of cast iron, with the components imported from the United Kingdom. It survived floods in 1878 that swept away a new toll bridge that had been built nearby.

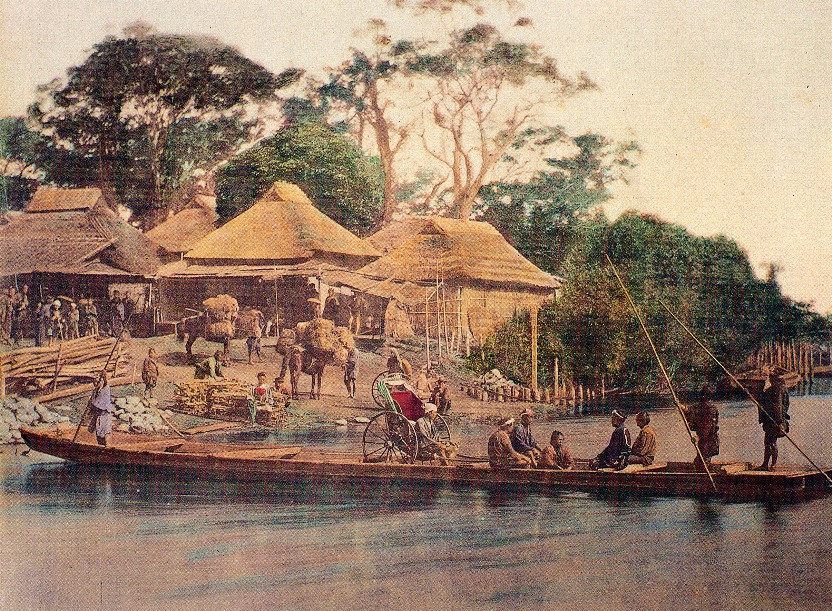
Rokugō in the 1860s, before the bridge

== Family ==
Boyle married in 1853 Eleonore Anne, daughter of W. Hack of Dieppe. They had one son, who died in infancy.
