= Oudh Irregular Force =

Military unit

The Oudh Irregular Force was a short-lived unit of the Bengal Army of the East India Company. It consisted of ten infantry regiments, three cavalry regiments, and four batteries, raised in 1856, all of which would mutiny during the Indian Rebellion of 1857.

== Formation ==
The annexation of Oudh State into the Bengal Presidency on 7 February 1856 created a need for a military force that could "establish law and order, suppress recalcitrant local chiefs and bandits, and serve as a semi-police force." The Oudh Irregular Force was thus created on the lines of the Punjab Irregular Force and intended to relieve the two European corps (32nd Foot and Kaye's European Field Battery, Bengal Artillery) and the Regular Service regiments of the Bengal Army brought to support the annexation.

The creation of an Irregular Force was also driven by the high cost of maintaining Regular regiments of the Bengal Army. A Regular Regiment which had a full complement of twenty-three European officers, though usually only 10 as the remaining were withdrawn for staff duties or to Irregular Regiments. In contrast, an Irregular Cavalry Regiment would only require "three line and 1 medical officer, usually an Assistant Surgeon, the combatant officers were the Commandant, the second in command and the Adjutant." The sub-unit of an Irregular Regiment, called a Risala would consist of "four Officer grades and one NCO grade" and a Nishanbardar (standard-bearer) instead of "two Officer grades and two NCOs." Irregular cavalry troops were in October 1858 paid up to 20 Rupees a month in contrast to the 9-11 Rupees a month paid to Regular troops but were required to find their own mounts and equipment.

The regiments of the unit were rapidly raised at Lucknow, and equipped from Cawnpore, almost entirely from the disbanded soldiers of the Nawab of Awadh. Sir Henry Daly of the Corps of Guides (India) was involved in raising the cavalry regiments. However, despite drawing from some of the most promising young officers in India, the regiments suffered from socio-economic and political problems. Regiments commanded by General John Hearsay and the Orr family along with those commanded by European and Anglo-Indian families supposedly had attained greater proficiency.

The force began deploying to its stations at Fyzabad, Durriabad, Salone, Sultanpore, Sitapore, Gonda, Secrora in early 1857.

== Indian Rebellion of 1857 ==
The officers of the Oudh Irregular Force remained convinced that they had the handle on their troops despite the spread of the rebellion across Meerut, Delhi and the proclamation of Bahadur Shah Zafar as the Emperor of India.

=== Sitapore ===
The 9th and 10th Oudh Irregular Infantry regiments were stationed along with the 41st Bengal Native Infantry and a military police battalion led Captain Hearsay, the son of Haider Hearsay, in Sitapore. The Lucknow mutineers were expected to march on Sitapore and a wing of the 41st Bengal Native Infantry was sent to oppose them. However, the regiment went off cheering though the wing that been sent out to oppose the mutineers returned under the command of Colonel Birch on 2 June 1857.

Sitapore commissioner Christian, distrusting the 41st, assembled the Irregulars and the Military Police battalion around his own bungalow. On the morning of 3 June, there was an alarm that 10th Irregulars were about the attack the treasury which was being guarded by a company of the 41st. Colonel Birch hastily collected some of his men to guard the treasury. As he left, word was passed that the 41st had shot their colonel, another officer and the sergeant-major.

The Irregular regiments heard the firing and within moments three officers of the 9th and two of the 10th, as well as a lady and a baby were killed. The rebelling soldiers poured into the commissioner's house, and set its thatched roof on fire. Commissioner Christian, his wife, and three-year-old daughter Sophie were among the twenty-four English men, women and children killed that morning. Most of the scattered survivors were captured over the coming weeks and executed in Lucknow though a few escaped to the Terai and Naini. Two women and a child would make it to the British lines after wandering for three months.

=== Fyzabad ===
On 7 June, civilian families were sent to protection of Rajah Man Singh, an influential local landowner. The families of the regimental officers were retained to avoid upsetting the troops. On 8 June, word spread that the 17th Native Infantry, which had mutinied in Azimgarh, was approaching Fyzabad. At 11PM that night, a bugle sounded in the lines of the 6th Irregulars. The 22nd Native Infantry seized the guns from the local troops and imprisoned their officers. On the morning of 9 June, these officers loaded into four boats on the Gogra river, and pushed off downstream along with their families.

However, the 22nd had sent word 17th, which intercepted them at Begum-Ganj. Facing heavy fire, the boats made toward the opposite bank and the occupants attempted to flee to the countryside. Colonel Goldney was found and killed after saying that he was too old to take to the jungles. The survivors, joined by occupants of the fourth boat, eventually reached Gorrukpore and safety. The second boat got stuck in a sandbank and all occupants were killed. The third boat made it beyond Begum-Ganj, and only suffering a robbery, before reaching Dinapur.

The families with Man Singh, and Colonel Lennox of the 22nd who had stayed behind with two or three ladies, eventually got to safety.

=== Sultanpore ===
The 15th Bengal Irregular Cavalry, the 8th Oudh Irregulars, and the 1st Military Police were stationed in Sultanpore. All the families had been safely evacuated to Allahabad. Colonel Fisher of the 15th rode to the military police lines on 8 June to attempt to restore order. He was shot through the back, along with another officer, and mortally wounded on his way back but able to return to his own lines. Lieutenant Tucker was the only officer to escape to a Rajah's fort on the Gomti River where he was joined by the officers of the 8th and 1st Military Police. Unhampered by women and children, all were able to escape to Benares.

=== Salone ===
The 1st Oudh Irregulars at Salone also mutinied but released their officers to safely flee to Allahabad.

=== Durriabad ===
Captain Hawes of the 5th Irregular Infantry attempted to march his regiment along with its treasury into Lucknow from Durriabad. The march started in an orderly manner but soon fell into an altercation and began firing. Hawes was safely able to gallop into Lucknow along with other civilian and military officers of the regiment.

=== Barraitch, Gonda and Secrora ===
The Gonda and Secrora cantonments were only occupied by regiments of the Oudh Irregular Force. The 3rd Irregular Infantry at Gonda mutinied on 9 June, forcing its civilian and military officers to flee to Gorruckpore. The Secrora cantonment was garrisoned by the 1st Irregular Cavalry regiment, the 2nd Irregular Infantry regiment and the 1st Field Battery. On 7 June, Sir Henry Montgomery Lawrence had ordered Captain Forbes of the 1st Irregular Cavalry, who believed he had some trustworthy Sikhs, to bring all families to Lucknow.

The officers were assembled that night at the bungalow of Commissioner Wingfield, who had made for Gonda leaving behind the men under his command. The officers then made for Gonda, leaving behind Lieutenant Bonham, who slept with the guns and collected the staff-sergeants around him. The temper of his gunners turned overnight, the guns placed in the evening were withdrawn. Acting on the advice of a loyalist subedar, Bonham was able to safely reach Lucknow through a circuitous route with all but one sergeant, who had opted to remain behind with his Indian wife and was killed.

=== Lucknow ===
The Irregular corps in Lucknow mutinied along with the Regulars and by 10 June, all of the three cavalry regiments, ten infantry regiments and four batteries of the Oudh Irregular Force had rebelled. The 7th Oudh Irregular Infantry regiment, posted in Lucknow, was among the first to "show signs of disaffection" on 30 April regarding the use of the new cartridges for the Pattern 1853 Enfield rifle. The men were convinced by the regiment's second-in-command, Lieutenant Mecham, who argued that the men had been using the cartridges without object since their adoption fifteen days ago. On 1 May, the sergeant-major of the unit reported that the sepoys were again refusing to bite the cartridges. "By the morning 3 May, the men were threatening to kill all European officers who, warned in time by the quartermaster-sergeant, arrived and, after some time, persuaded the sepoys to return to their lines, although they still carried their arms."

Sir Henry Lawrence now "brought a force consisting of the 32nd (Cornwall) Regiment of Foot, a European artillery battery, three native infantry regiments and two native cavalry regiments while the men of the 7th Oudh Irregular were paraded." The men were disarmed by midnight, and 57 ringleaders were arrested. Lawrence held a Court of Inquiry and dismissed native officers and 15 sepoys and promoted 6. "The remainder were forgiven, but only 200 of them were re-armed. The ringleaders were kept in irons." On 27 May, Captain Gould Weston would lead one company of men from the 7th Oudh Irregulars to "quieten the increasing disturbances in Malihabad." The Irregular Cavalry would desert the company and Weston and Lt. Mecham mistrusting the soldiers who had been rebellious only days ago would turn back toward Lucknow in anticipation of its siege.

The Queen's Own Cameron Highlanders, who were involved in the Capture of Lucknow, captured the colours of an Oudh Irregular Regiment. The colours remain on display at the Cameron Barracks in Inverness.
