= Ross Mangles =

British colonial administrator (1833–1905)

- 1859–1862 painting of Mangles carrying a wounded soldier of the 37th Foot during the siege of Arrah
- Born: 14 April 1833; Calcutta, British India
- Died: 28 February 1905 (aged 71); Pirbright, Surrey
- Burial place: Brookwood Cemetery; 51.297390°N 0.625679°W
- Awards: Victoria Cross

Ross Lowis Mangles, VC (14 April 1833 – 28 February 1905) was a British colonial administrator who was a recipient of the Victoria Cross, the highest and most prestigious award for gallantry in the face of the enemy that can be awarded to British and Commonwealth forces. Mangles is one of only five civilians to be awarded the Victoria Cross.

== Biography ==
=== Early life ===
Mangles was the son of Ross Donnelly Mangles, sometime chairman of the East India Company. He was educated at Windlesham House School, Brighton (1842–43), Bath Grammar School and East India Company College (1851–52). He took up a place in the Bengal Civil Service in 1853.

=== Victoria Cross ===
1882 illustration of Mangles carrying the wounded soldier

He was 24 years old, and a civilian in the Bengal Civil Service during the Indian Mutiny when the following deed took place during the siege of Arrah for which he was awarded the VC:

Mr. Ross Lowis Mangles, of the Bengal Civil Service, Assistant Magistrate at Patna

Date of Act of Bravery, 30th July, 1857

Mr. Mangles volunteered and served with the Force, consisting of detachments of Her Majesty's 10th and 37th Regiments, and some Native Troops, despatched to the relief of Arrah, in July, 1857, under the Command of Captain Dunbar, of the 10th Regiment. The Force fell into an Ambuscade on the night of the 29th of July, 1857, and, during the retreat on the next morning, Mr. Mangles, with signal gallantry and generous self-devotion, and notwithstanding that he had himself been previously wounded, carried for several miles, out of action, a wounded soldier of Her Majesty's 37th Regiment, after binding up his wounds under a murderous fire, which killed or wounded almost the whole detachment and he bore him in safety to the boats.

His Victoria Cross is displayed at the National Army Museum, Chelsea, England.

=== Subsequent life and career ===
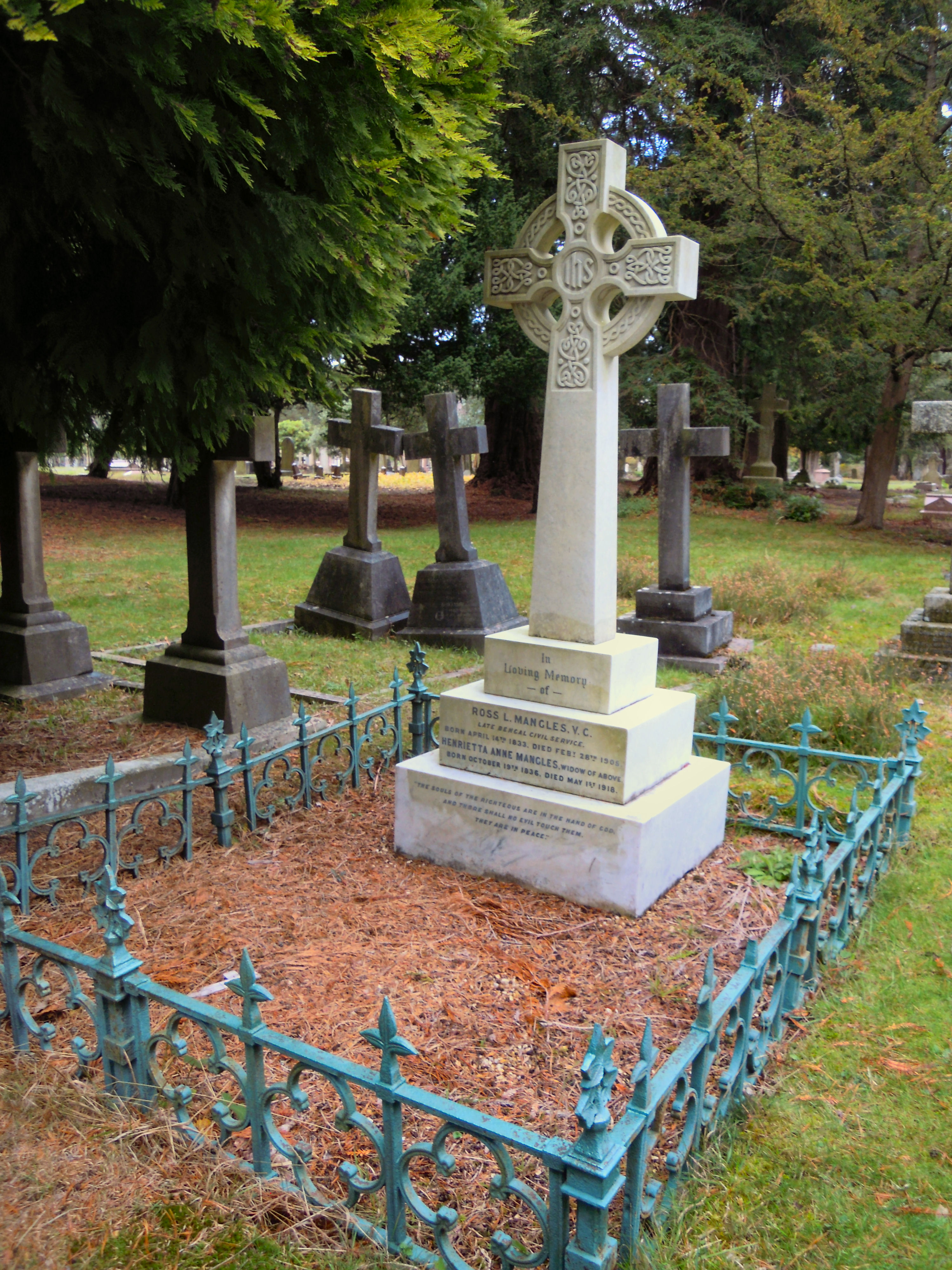
Mangles' grave in Brookwood Cemetery

Mangles held various positions in India, including those Judicial Commissioner of Mysore, Secretary to the Government of Bengal, and member of the Board of Revenue of the Lower Provinces. He retired from Indian service in 1883, having completed thirty years' service, and returned to England, where he was a justice of the peace for Surrey. He died at his residence, The Lodge, Pirbright, Surrey, on 28 February 1905.

He is buried in Brookwood Cemetery. On the north wall of St Michael and All Angels Church, Pirbright is a brass memorial to Mangles. The oaks on the plaque represent England, his native land; the palms are for India, scene of his life's work; his passion for growing roses after his retirement is also commemorated.

=== Family ===
Mangles married in 1860 Henrietta Molyneux, youngest daughter of James More Molyneux, of Loseley Park, Surrey.

Freemasonry

He was an active freemason, and member of Morning Star No. 552 E.C.
