= Hare Krishna Singh =

Indian resistance commander (1827–1858)

Salar-i-Jung Rajkumar Hare Krishna Singh Bhadauria
- Born: 1827; Shahabad district, Bihar, India
- Died: 1858 (aged 30–31) Patna
- Service years: 1857-1858
- Rank: Tehsildar, Commander
- Conflicts: Siege of Arrah; Indian Rebellion of 1857; Various subsequent battles

Hare Krishna Singh Bhadauria (1826-1858) was the commander-in-chief of Kunwar Singh's forces in the Indian Rebellion of 1857 and also served under his brother Babu Amar Singh.

== Early life ==
Hare Krishna Singh was born in 1827 in the village of Barubhee in Shahabad district of Bihar to Shri Aidal Singh who was a landlord. His original occupation was as a tehsildar for the Jagdishpur estate and was in charge of Piro pargana. British sources describe him as a middle sized man who was 30 years old at the time of the rebellion. He brushed his moustache upwards in the style of an up-country sowar.

== Role in the 1857 rebellion ==
He played an important role in convincing Kunwar Singh to take up arms against the British and was given the duty to command his forces. He was aged 30 at the time of the rebellion and participated in many battles against the British forces. He is considered by some to have been the "prime mover" of the rebellion against the British in Bihar as he was instrumental in recruiting the mutinous sepoys stationed at Danapur with three regiments marching to join the rebels in Jagdispur. He marched with the force westwards towards Lucknow and achieved a major victory in a battle against Major Douglas in Lohara, 10 miles (16 km) west of Azamgarh.

After Kunwar Singh's death he continued to serve under his brother Babu Amar Singh. During the period after Kunwar Singh's death, a bounty of Rs 1000 was placed on his head by the British. He was also made the head of the government under the authority of Amar Singh and was considered to have run an efficient military system with different ranks being awarded to soldiers.

He was captured in 1858 and executed by hanging.

== Assessment ==
Ranjit Ram, a former commander under Kunwar Singh, later recalled that, on the death of his superior, Hare Krishna had become "the leading man … and had charge of all the treasure, etc."
