= Danapur Cantonment =

Indian army cantonment in Patna, Bihar

- City
- Location in Bihar, India Danapur Cantonment (India) Danapur Cantonment (Bihar)
- Coordinates: 25°38′04″N 85°01′35″E
- Country: India
- State: Bihar
- District: Patna
- Established: 1765

Population (2011)
  - Total: 28,723

Languages
  - Official: Hindi
- Time zone: UTC+5:30 (IST)
- Postal code: 801 503
- ISO 3166 code: IN-BR
- Vehicle registration: BR-01
- Website: danapur.cantt.gov.in

Danapur Cantonment or Danapur Cantt is a cantonment town in Danapur, Patna District in the state of Bihar, India. Danapur is a category II cantonment, established in 1765. The board consists of 14 members including 7 elected members. Danapur Cantonment, located on the outskirts of Patna, is the second oldest cantonment in India, after Barrackpur Cantonment, West Bengal. Danapur is the regimental centre of the Bihar Regiment (BRC). It was earlier called Bankipore Cantonment. Initially, it was set up at Bankipore but later set up in the Danapur area (then known as Dinapur) in 1766–67.

== History ==
Danapur was known as Dinapur during the British period. The word Dinapur means the "city of grains", being located in the fertile Gangetic Plains. Danapur Cantonment played a big role in the freedom struggle of 1857, as on 25 July 1857 sepoys of the Danapur Cantonment revolted against the British.

Established in 1765, Danapur Cantonment happens to be the second-oldest cantonment in the country after Barrackpore in West Bengal, which was established in the 17th century. It was the only white cantonment of the East India Company at one point of time, and the largest military cantonment in Bengal which stationed two artillery batteries, a European and native infantry regiment. Located on the southern banks of the Ganga, Danapur was chosen perhaps due to the availability of an inland water route to Calcutta through the Ganga.

On 10 May 1857, sepoys posted at Meerut rebelled and started India's First War of Independence, which the British termed as Sepoy Mutiny. This freedom struggle spread to Danapur on 25 July 1857. Danapur happened to be the second important center in the country, which influenced Eastern Uttar Pradesh, Bengal and Orissa. At that time, the British had their epicenter in Calcutta; therefore the uprising in Danapur was more important to the British than the uprising in the North India. On 25 July, mutiny erupted in the garrisons of Dinapur. Mutinying sepoys from 7th, 8th, and 40th Regiments of Bengal Native Infantry quickly moved towards the city of Arrah and were joined by Babu Kunwar Singh and his men. The Siege of Arrah was eventually crushed on 3 August 1857 by Major Vincent Eyre (The 5th Fusiliers) and his men.

The garrison was used by the British during World War II as an administrative base. This garrison was to provide transit facilities to the British Expeditionary Force from Calcutta towards the northern provinces of India. It had a war cemetery to commemorate those who laid their lives on the Burma campaign. Today, the Arrah Barracks, St Luke's Church, Havlock Church, the Flag Staff House, Military Hospital, Supply Depot and The Bihar Regimental Centre etc. stand testimony to the rich history and heritage of Danapur Cantonment.

A Category II cantonment, Danapur Cantt is spread across an area of approximately 848.50 acres.

== Demographics ==
As of 2011 India census, Danapur Cantonment had a population of 28,723. Males constitute 54% of the population and females 46%. Danapur Cantonment has an average literacy rate of 81%, higher than the national average of 59.5%: male literacy is 87% and, female literacy is 73%. In Danapur Cantonment, 13% of the population is under 6 years of age.

== Transport and connectivity ==
Danapur Cantt is very well connected by road, rail and air. NH 30 and Bailey Road links the cantt to other cities of Bihar.

It is connected to most of the major cities in India by railway network. Patna Junction, Patliputra Junction, and Danapur railway station are the major railway stations.

Nearest Airport to Danapur Cantt is Jay Prakash Narayan International Airport at Patna, which is 6 km away.

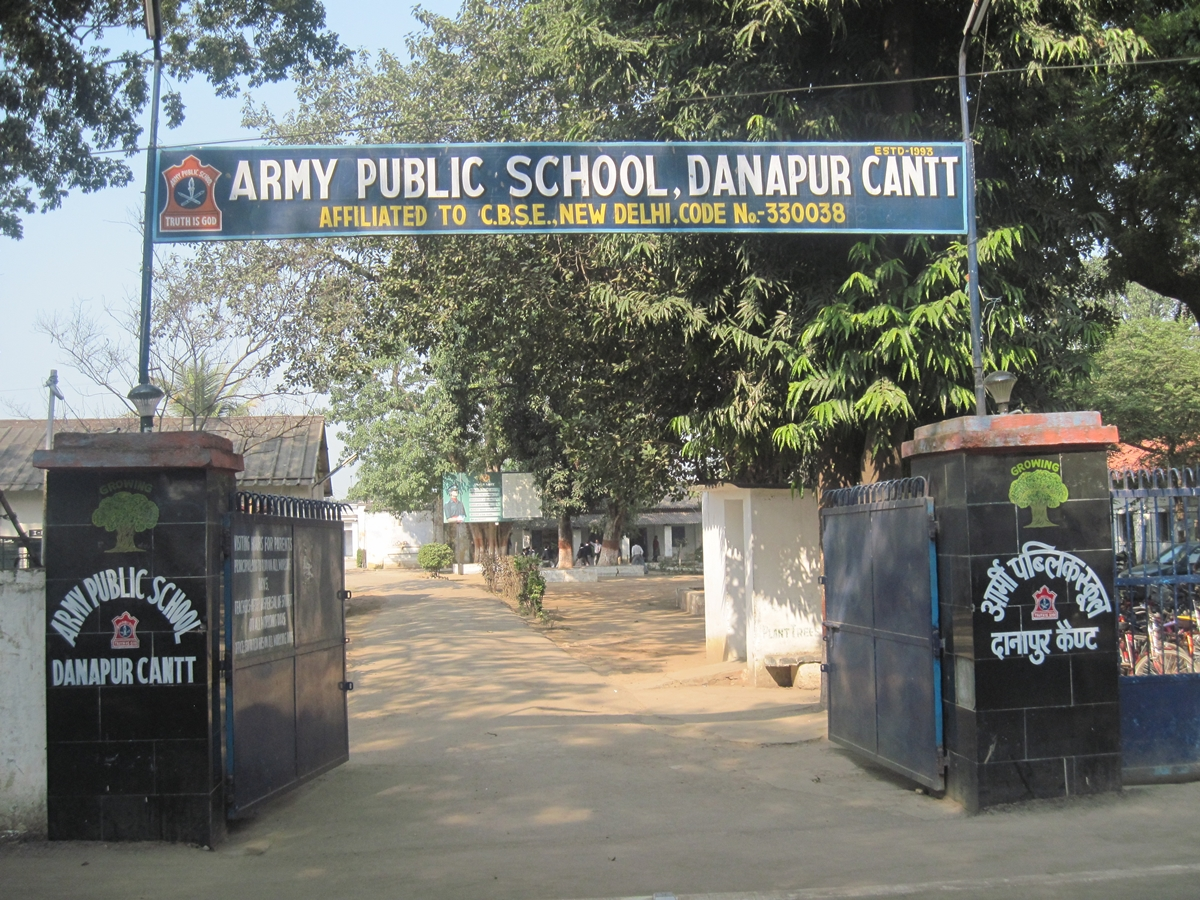
School Entrance of Army School Danapur Cantt

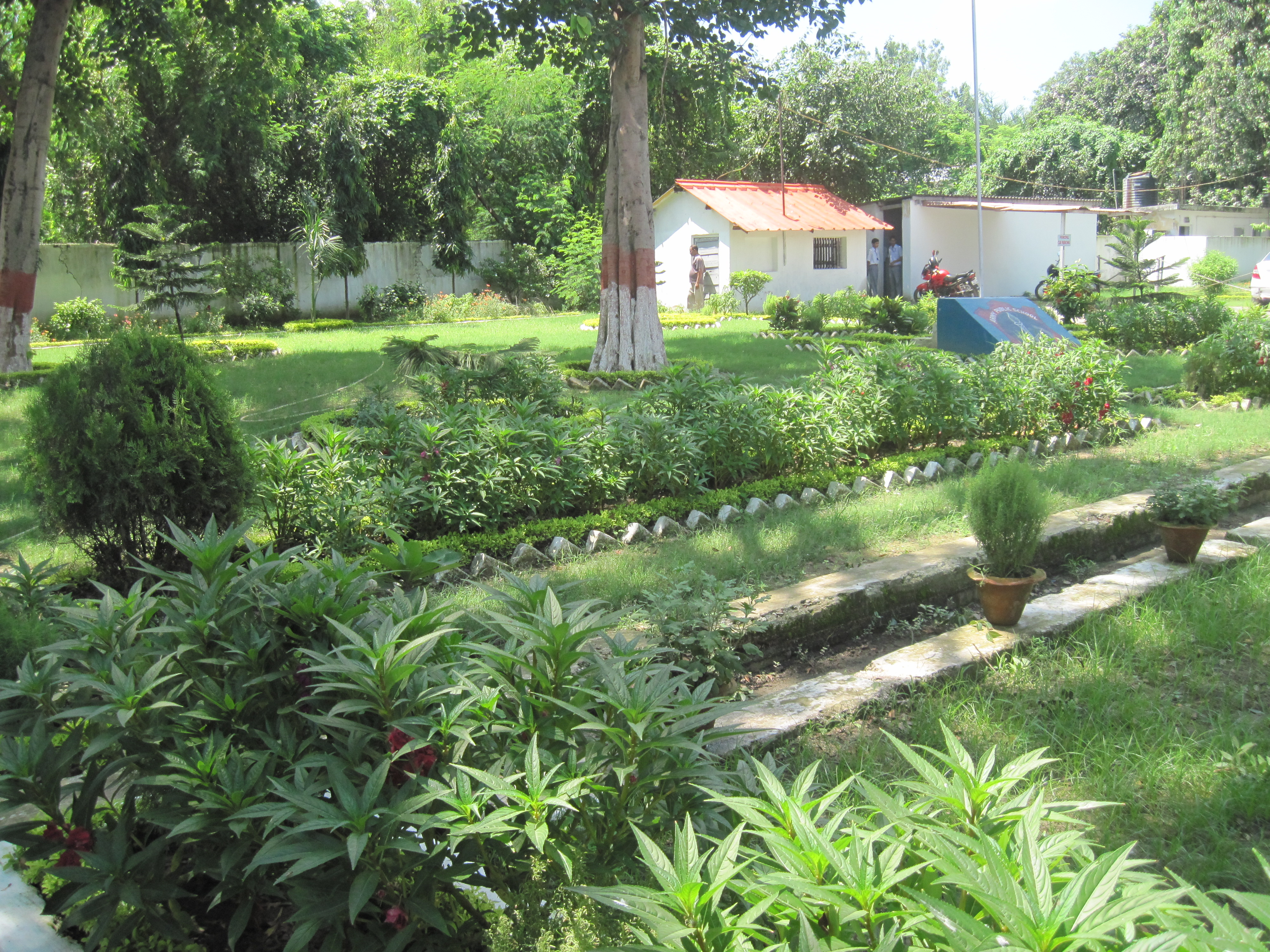
School Garden of Army Public School, Danapur cantt

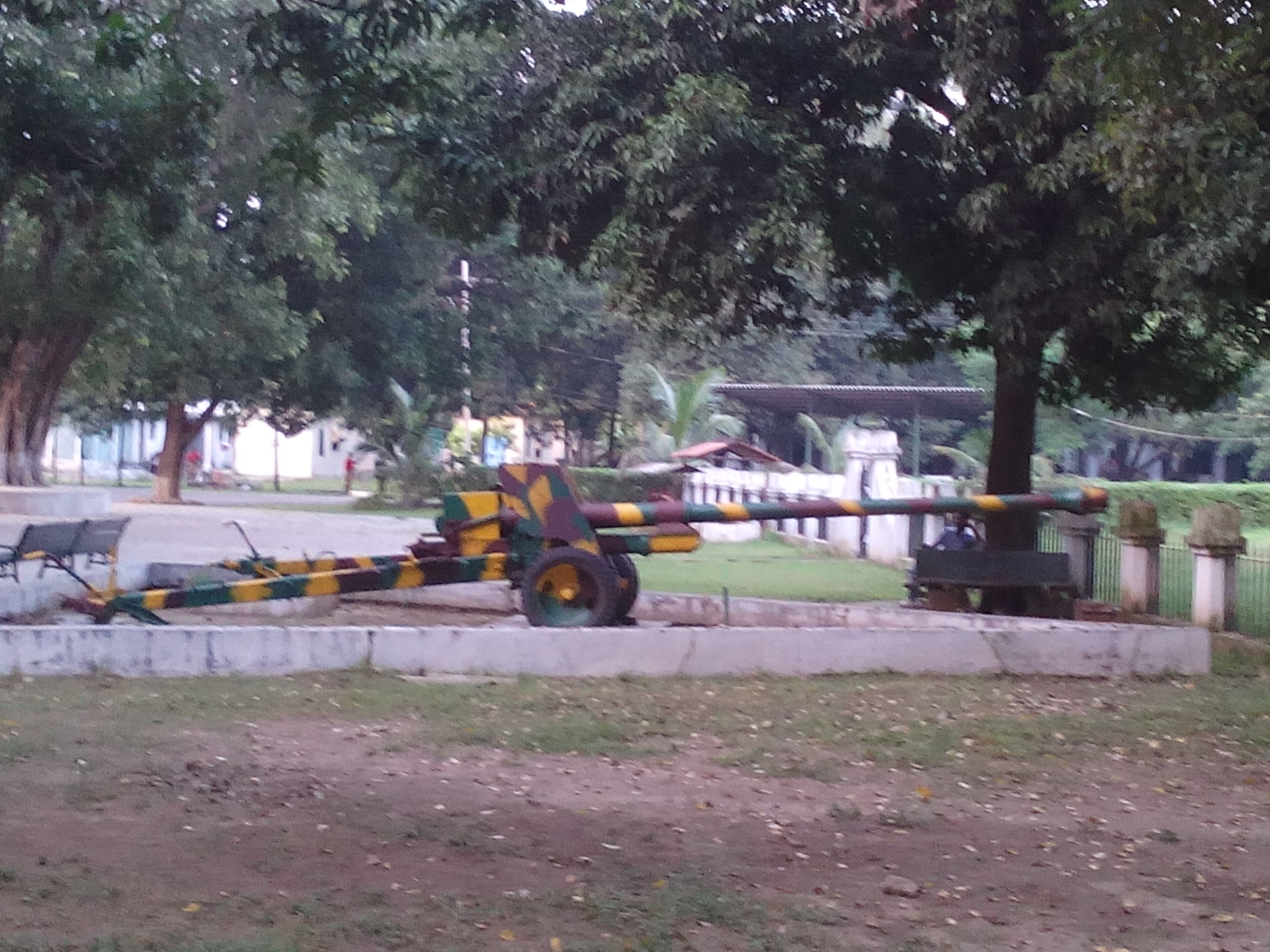
Danapur Cantonment

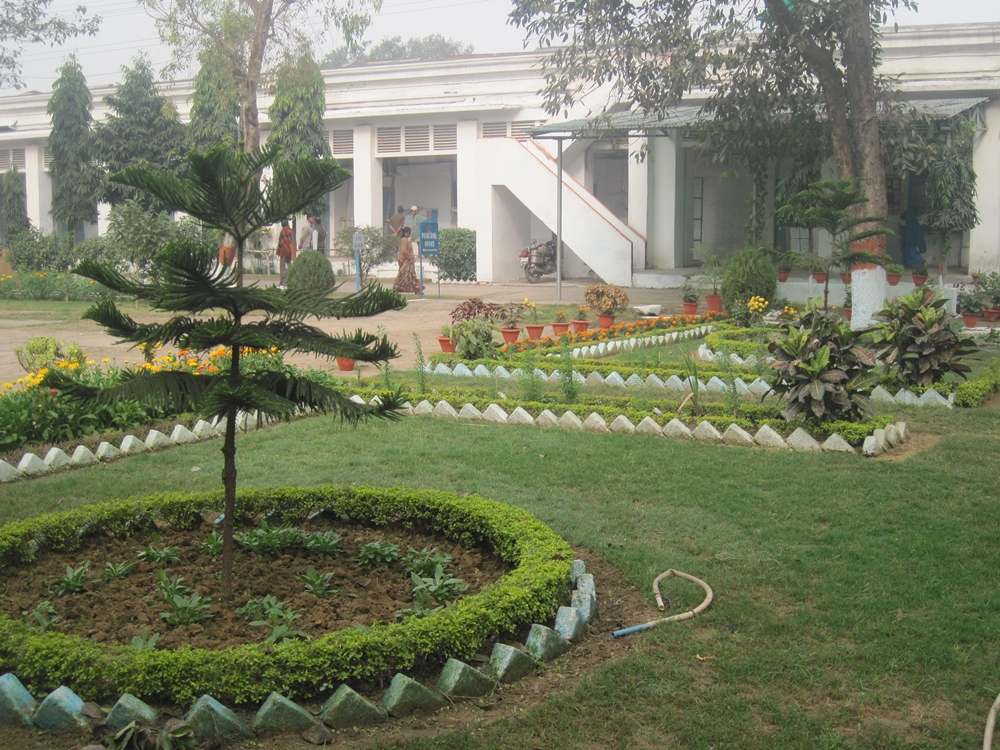
Building of Army Public School, Danapur Cantt

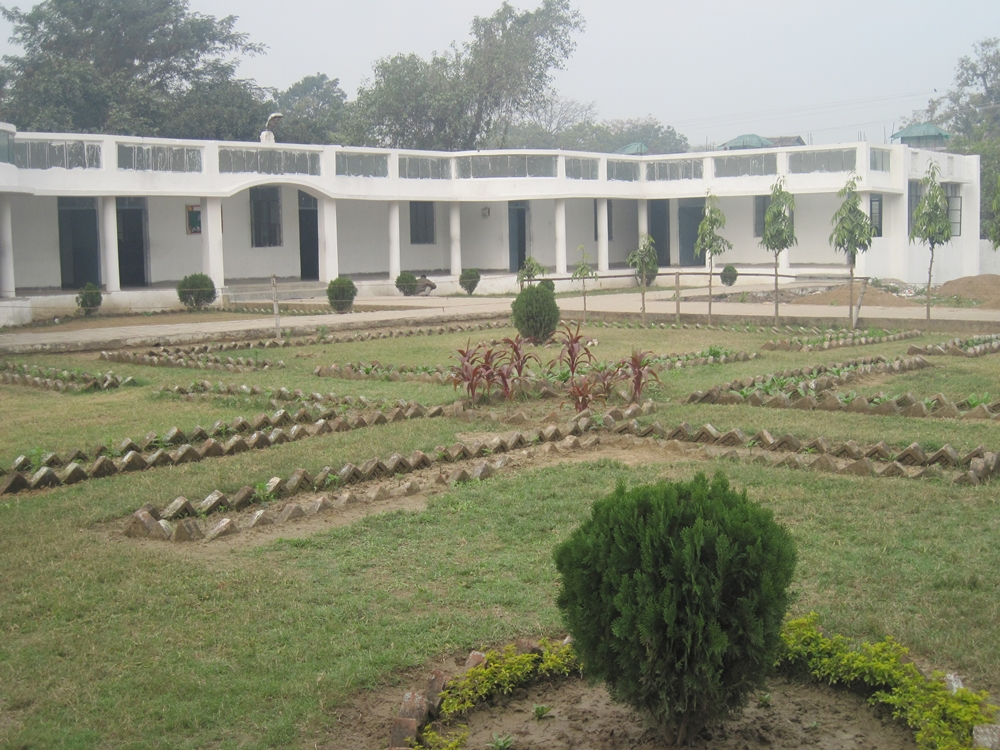
Building of Army Public School, Danapur Cantt

== See also ==
- Battle of Buxar
- Bihar Regiment
- Army Public School, Danapur Cantt
- St Luke's Church, Patna, Bihar
