= William Fraser McDonell =

Recipient of the Victoria Cross

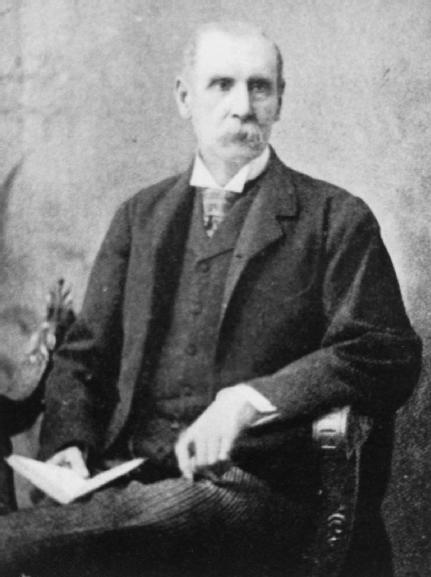
- Born: 17 December 1829; Cheltenham, Gloucestershire
- Died: 31 July 1894 (aged 64); Cheltenham, Gloucestershire
- Burial place: St Peter's Churchyard, Leckhampton
- Military career
- Allegiance: United Kingdom
- Conflicts: Indian Mutiny
- Awards: Victoria Cross
- Other work: Judge

William Fraser McDonell VC (17 December 1829 – 31 July 1894) was a British civil servant, judge and a recipient of the Victoria Cross, the highest award for gallantry in the face of the enemy that can be awarded to British and Commonwealth forces. He is one of only five civilians to have been awarded the VC.

== Details ==
Educated at Cheltenham College and East India Company College (later succeeded by the Haileybury and Imperial Service College), he was 27 years old, and a civilian in the Bengal Civil Service during the Indian Mutiny when the following deed took place on 30 July 1857 during the retreat from Arrah for which he was awarded the VC:

Mr. William Fraser M'Donell, of the Bengal Civil Service, Magistrate of Sarun

Date of Act of Bravery, 30th July, 1857

For great coolness and bravery on the 30th of July, 1857, during the retreat of the British Troops from Arrah, in having climbed, under an incessant fire, outside the Boat in which he and several Soldiers were, up to the rudder, and with considerable difficulty cut through the lashing which secured it to the side of the boat. On the lashing being cut, the boat obeyed the helm, and thus thirty-five European Soldiers escaped certain death.

He was later a Judge of the High Court of Judicature in Calcutta from 1874 to 1876.

== The Medal ==
His VC is on display in the Lord Ashcroft Gallery at the Imperial War Museum, London.

== McDonell Monument Kolkata ==
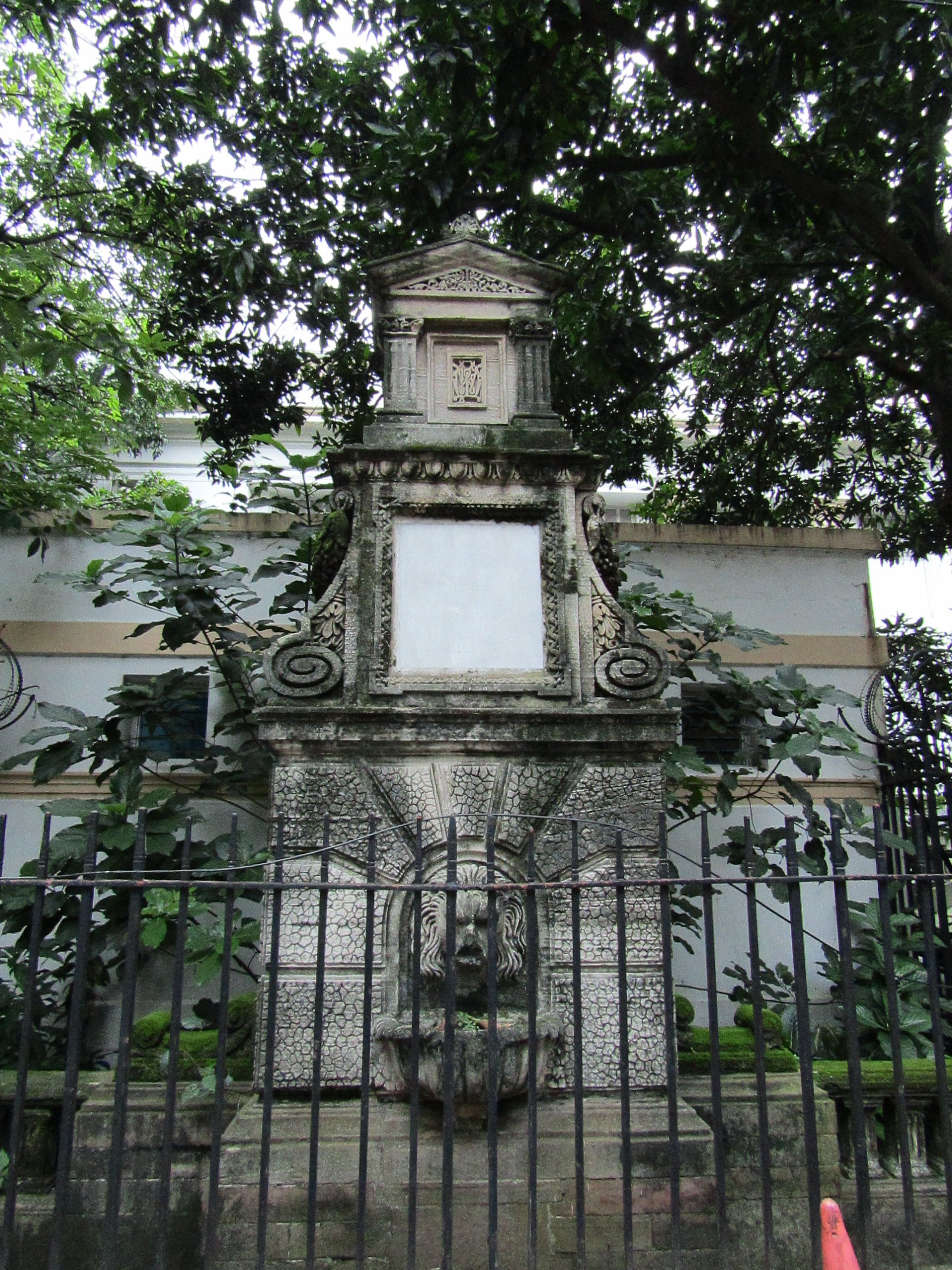
McDonell Fountain in Kolkata

Adjacent to the Kolkata High Court is a water fountain dedicated to William Fraser McDonell.
