= St Luke's Church, Patna =

Church in Danapur Cantonment, Bihar State

Saint Luke's Church
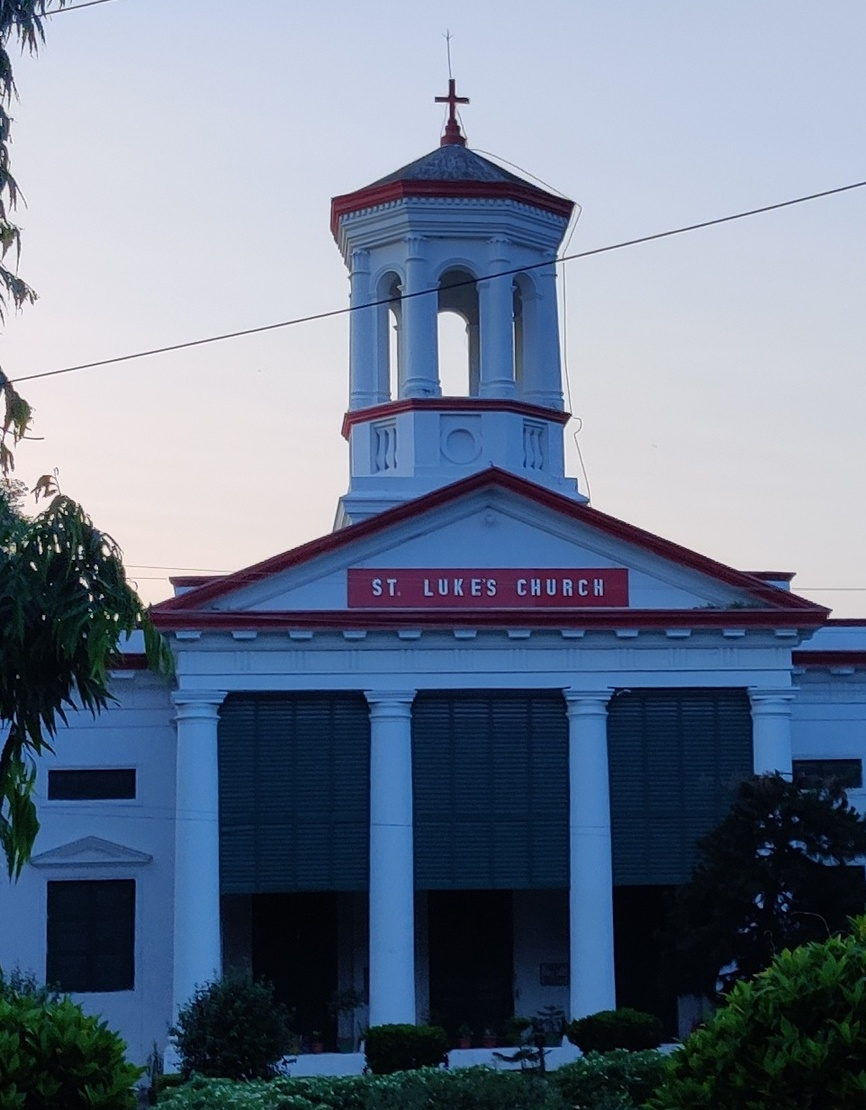
- St Luke's Church , Danapur Patna , Bihar
- Interactive map of Saint Luke's Church
- 25.636542°N 85.0338506°E
- Location: Dinapur Cantonment, Patna, Bihar

History
- Built: 1827-1830

St. Luke's Church is located at Danapur Cantonment in Danapur, a satellite town of Patna in the Indian state of Bihar. It is around 10 kilometers from Jay Prakash Narayan Airport. It is more than 200 years old, and has stood on the site through the most turbulent times in Indian history.

The building is typical of 19th century British colonial architecture. It is now within the grounds of the Bihar Regimental Centre and is maintained by the Indian Army.

Reverend Henry Frank Fulford Williams (1885-1966) served as a chaplain in Bengal from 1913 until 1935, and was chaplain at St. Luke's for part of his tenure.

== History ==
The East India Company set up a military station here due to its location on the bank of river Ganges at a junction with other rivers like the Son River from the south and the Ghaghara and Gandaki River from the north. Rivers were important transport routes before railways were built in India.

The British built a church at the station to provide for the spiritual needs of its servants and medical aid. The construction of the church started in April 1827 by Captain I Thompson of British Engineers. It was completed in 1830 under the guidance of Captain W Sage of the 48th Native Infantry. It was later named St. Luke's Church of Patna.

During the Indian Rebellion of 1857, a number of barracks were constructed around the church to provide shelter for the soldiers.

The belfry was a later addition. It was designed by Frederick William Alexander De Fabeck, an assistant surgeon in the Bengal Army, and built in 1862.

The Bihar Regimental Centre took over responsibility for the building from the Church of North India in 1947.
