= Vincent Eyre =

British Indian Army general (1811–1881)

Major-General Sir Vincent Eyre KCSI, CB
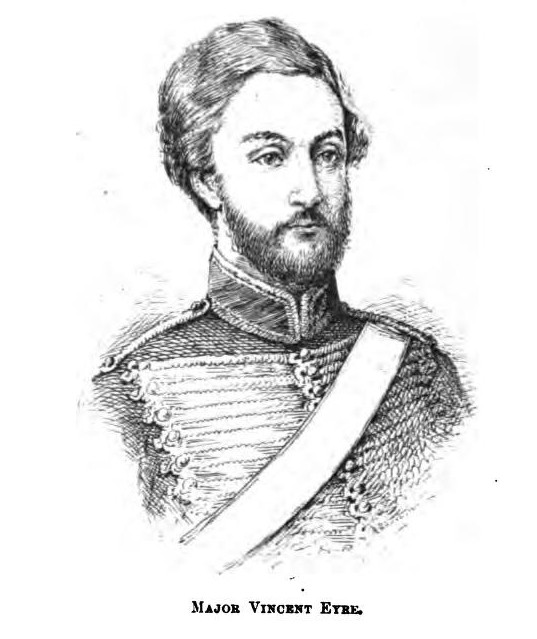
- Vincent Eyre
- Born: 22 January 1811; Portsdown, Portsmouth
- Died: 22 September 1881 (aged 70); Aix-les-Bains, France
- Military career
- Allegiance: United Kingdom
- Branch: East India Company; British Indian Army
- Rank: Major-General
- Conflicts: First Anglo-Afghan War; Indian Mutiny

Major-General Sir Vincent Eyre KCSI CB (22 January 1811 – 22 September 1881) was an officer in the Indian Army, who saw active service in India and Afghanistan.

== Early life ==
Born in Portsdown, Portsmouth on 22 January 1811, Eyre was the third son of Captain Henry Eyre and was educated at Norwich School.

== Military career ==
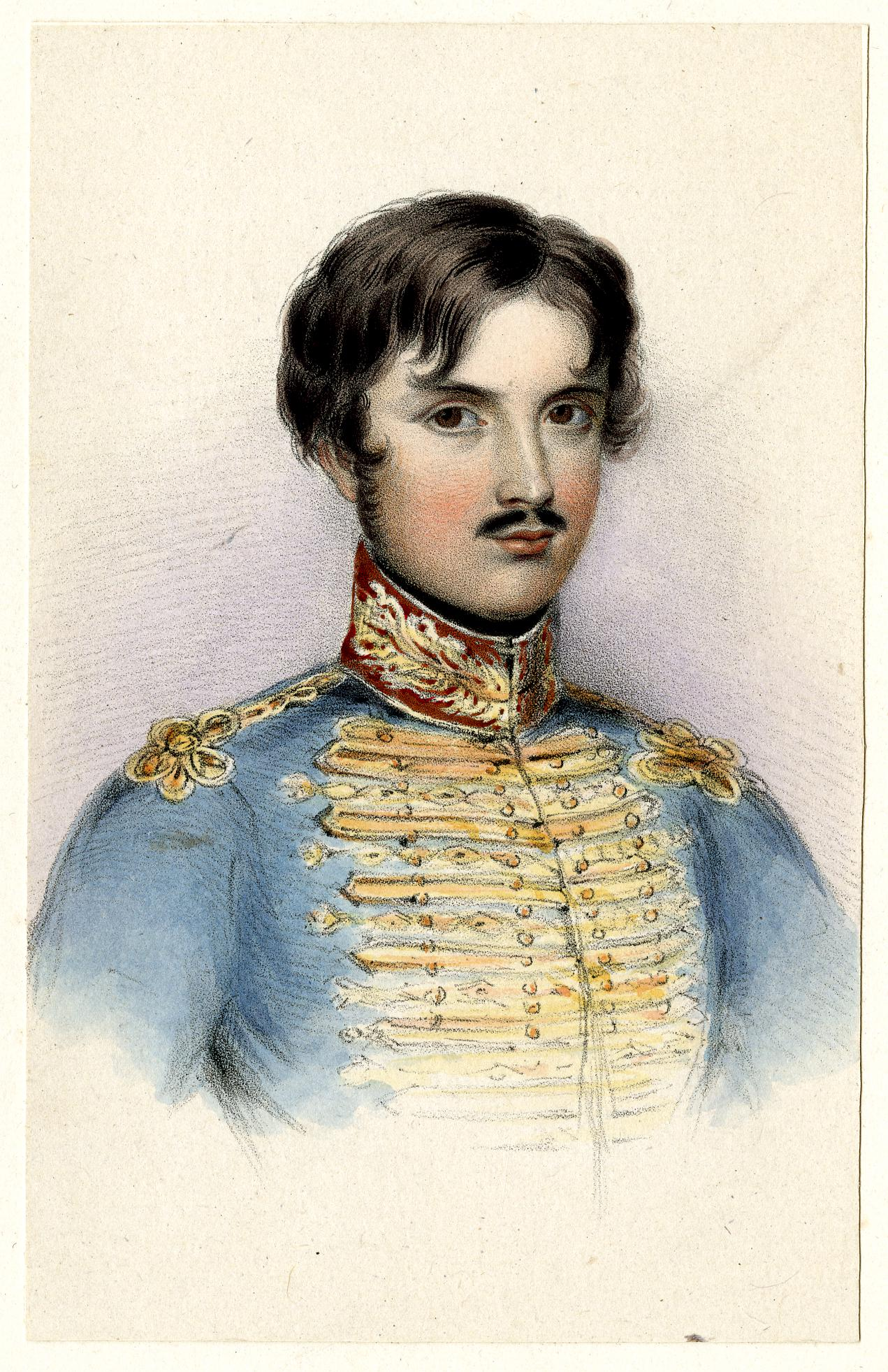
Self-portrait of Lieutenant Vincent Eyre from Prison Sketches. Comprising portraits of the Cabul prisoners, and other subjects

In 1827, he entered the Addiscombe Military Seminary and the service of the East India Company. He joined the Bengal Artillery in 1828, and in 1829 arrived in Calcutta. In 1837 he was appointed to the horse artillery and promoted Lieutenant. Two years later, he was appointed Commissary of Ordnance to the Cabul field force. In January 1842, During the First Anglo-Afghan War, Eyre and his family were captured by Akbar Khan. During nearly nine months in captivity, Eyre kept a diary describing his experiences, illustrated by the sketches of other officers and ladies. The manuscript was smuggled out to a friend in British India and was then published in England as Military Operations at Cabul (1842). The Eyre family were rescued by Sir George Pollock in September 1842. In 1844 Eyre was appointed to command the artillery of the new Gwalior contingent. He was responsible for the relief of the Siege of Arrah. He took part in the Relief of Lucknow, during the Indian Rebellion of 1857. He was promoted lieutenant colonel that year and brevet colonel the following year.

In 1857 he founded Esapóre (or the "Abode of Christians"), a colony for destitute families of Portuguese descent. In 1861, Lord Canning selected Eyre to serve on a commission set up to consider amalgamating the Presidency armies of the East India Company with the British Army. In 1863 he was ordered home on sick leave and retired as a major-general.

He was appointed a Knight Commander of the Order of the Star of India in 1867.

== Later activities ==
Finding himself in France during the Franco-Prussian War, Eyre set up an ambulance service under the auspices of the Red Cross. In his later years, he spent the winters in Rome. He died in Aix-les-Bains, France, on 22 September 1881. His remains were brought to London and a tomb was erected for him in Kensal Green Cemetery. A sketch of his tomb is archived in the National Portrait Gallery.

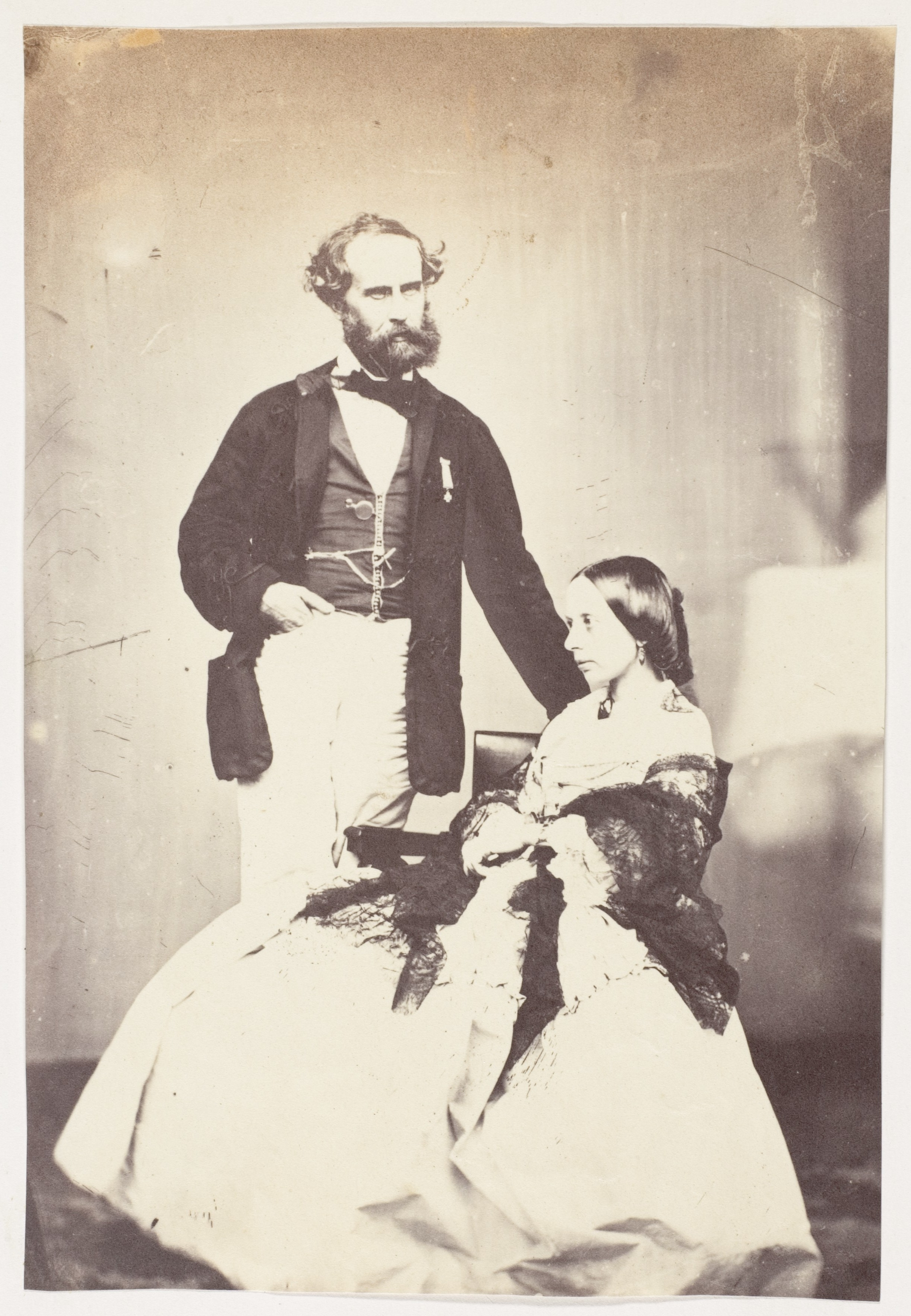
Photograph (1858–1861) of Mr and Mrs Eyre

== Publications ==
- Eyre, Vincent (1842). The Military Operations at Cabul, which Ended in the Retreat and Destruction of the British Army, January 1842 (1 ed.). London: John Murray.
  - —————— (1843). The Military Operations at Cabul, which Ended in the Retreat and Destruction of the British Army, January 1842 (2 ed.). London: John Murray.
- —————— (1843). Prison Sketches, Comprising Portraits of the Cabul Prisoners, and Other Subjects. London: Dickinson & Son.
- —————— (1867). "The Sikh and European Soldiers of our Indian Forces". The Journal of the Royal United Service Institution. 11 (43): 86–103. doi:10.1080/03071846709433586.
- —————— (1869). A Retrospect of the Affghan War: With Reference to Passing Events in Central Asia. London: W. H. Allen & Co.
- —————— (1874). Lays of a Knight-Errant in Many Lands. London: Henry S. King & Co.
- —————— (1875). The old stories of Rome: a Lent lecture in verse and prose, dedicated to the British and American Archaelogical Society. Rome: Tipografia Romana.
- —————— (1879). Malleson, George Bruce (ed.). The Kabul Insurrection of 1841‒42. London: W. H. Allen & Company.
