= Santhāgāra =

Santhagara is a Pali word derived from combination of Santha or Sanstha in Sanskrit (group) and Agara (house or assembly point) and was used for the general assembly hall of a particular Gaṇasaṅgha kshatriya clan of ancient northern India where the old and younger of the same clan meets to decide on the general and state affairs. Santhagara was associated with republican states and its history traces back to 600 B.C. The republican states were known as gaṇa or saṅgha. Buddhist literatures show that Santhagara of republic states used to control foreign affairs, entertaining foreign Ambassadors and princes, and deciding on peace and war proposals. The history of democracy in India is believed to be starting from Santhagara and India derives its official name Bhārat Gaṇarājya, the Republic of India, from the Gaṇa. Other evidences of this period identifies saṅghas or gaṇas as not completely democracies but sort of corporations and also not as republics but oligarchies, where power was exercised by groups of people.

== Origin of Santhagara ==
Buddhist and Jain literatures gives references about Santhagara with non-monarchial states like Shakyas of Kapilvastu, the Mallakas of Pava and Kusinara, the Licchavikas or Licchavi (kingdom) of Vaisali, the Vaidehas of Mithila, the Koliyas of Ramagrama and Devadaha (Nawalparasi), the Moriyas of Pipphalvana, and the Bhaggas with their capital on Sumsumara Hill. Maha-Govinda Suttanta gives references about Sakya's heaven which was modeled on Santhagara of Sakya. The Lichchhavi santhagara is mentioned in detail in The Ekpanna Jataka, Chullakalinga Jataka (Jataka tales)and Mahāvastu.

== Functioning of Santhagara ==
The minimum age to become member of Shakya Santhagara was twenty years. The assembly had strong sentiments against hereditary privileges and supported the principle of free election by the Gaṇa to all-important posts, including that of Commander-in-chief known as Ganapati, Ganajyestha, Ganaraja, or Sanghamukhya which was the highest authority in state.

In the assembly, there were different posts known as Vargya, Grihya and Pakshya who clashed from time to time for power. The term Dvandva was used to denote the rival parties and the term Vyutkramana to their rivalry. Transaction of the Assembly business strictly required a Quorum without which it was considered invalid. Panini refers to gaṇa-titha as the person whose attendance completed the quorum in a Gaṇa and to saṅgha-titha as one who completed the quorum of the Sangha. The person who acted as a “whip” Whip (politics) to secure the “quorum” was known as gaṇa-pūraka. The seat regulator whose main job was to allot the seats to persons on dais, front seats and other places depending on their position was known as “Asanapannapaka”. Voting was done with pieces of wood known as salaka. The collector of votes was the Salaka-Grahapaka, chosen for this job on account of his reputation of his honesty and impartiality. The word used for votes was “Chhanda” which meant free choice. The president of the state who was known as “Samghyamukhya” was responsible for presiding the assembly and regulating the debates. He was expected to observe strict impartiality and if he failed, he was furiously criticized. The voting methodology was of three types – by Guthaka (secret method), by Sakarnajapakam (whispering method) and by Vivatakam (Open method). Generally the assembly contains four to twenty executive members. The Raja (King), Upa-Raja (Sub-ordinate king), Senapati (military commanders) and Bhandagarika (treasurers) seem to be the designation of four executive members.

The Malla state, which was small, had an executive of four members only in their Santhagara, all of them have taken a prominent part in the funeral of Buddha. On the other hand, Lichchhavis had nine Executive officers (kings) in their assembly. The confederations of Lichchhavis and Videhas had Executive of Eighteen members. According to Buddhist literatures, the Lichchhavis formed a league with Videha and together they were called as “Vajjis”. Lichchhavis had once formed a federation with their neighbor, The Malla. The federal council was composed of eighteen members, nine Lichchhavis and nine Malla. The president of federation was known as gaṇa-rāja. In a federation, both parties were having equal rights even though Malla were not a great power as Lichchhavis.

== Events associated with Santhagara ==
1. Siddhārtha Gautama, Gautama Buddha was initiated as member of Shakya Santhagara when he turned twenty. When he was twenty eight years old, a major clash took place between Koliya and Sakya over water of Rohini River. Shakya military commander decided to start a war on Koliya and Siddhartha opposed it. Siddhartha brought peace proposal in front of Santhagara which failed miserably during voting. As a consequence Siddhartha has to go in exile, Pabbajja
2. According to Ambattha sutta , of the Digha Nikaya, when the Brahmana Ambattha visited Kapilvastu, members of the Shakya assembly are said to have laughed at him, treating him with scant respect.
3. Shakyans who were proud of superiority of their blood, decided not give a Shakyan girl to Pasenadi, King of Kosala in their Santhagara and instead gave slave girl as Shakyan girl. This resulted in mass scale massacre of Shakyas and demolition of santhagara by Virudhaka, son of Prasenjit after knowing the truth.
4. Lichchhavis honored the beautiful courtesan Ambapali as Nagarvadhu in one of their annual meetings.
5. Malla and Lichchhavis as per Buddhist literatures, requested lord Gautama Buddha to perform the opening ceremonies of their Santhagar by first using them for delivering a sermon to a congregation assembled therein.
6. Gautama Buddha was very pleased to see the functioning of Lichchhavi Santhagara and he directed his pupils to pattern the Buddhist monastic order (Buddhist sangha) on the Lichchhavis sangha polities.
7. The Malla of Kusinara, Kushinagar discussed the problems related to funeral of Buddha and disposal of his ashes in their Santhagara.

== Fall of Santhagara ==
Santhagara started to disappear with the fall of republican states like Malla, Shakya, and Lichchhavis. Malla lost their independence to Magadha Empire soon after Buddha’s death. Magadha King Ajatshatru conquered Lichchhavis after a prolonged battle which continued for 16 years. Later on Samudraguptas military campaign finished the Lichchhavis states.
