= Bhagga =

Republican tribe in Iron-Age India

- c. 7th century BCE–c. 5th-4th century BCE
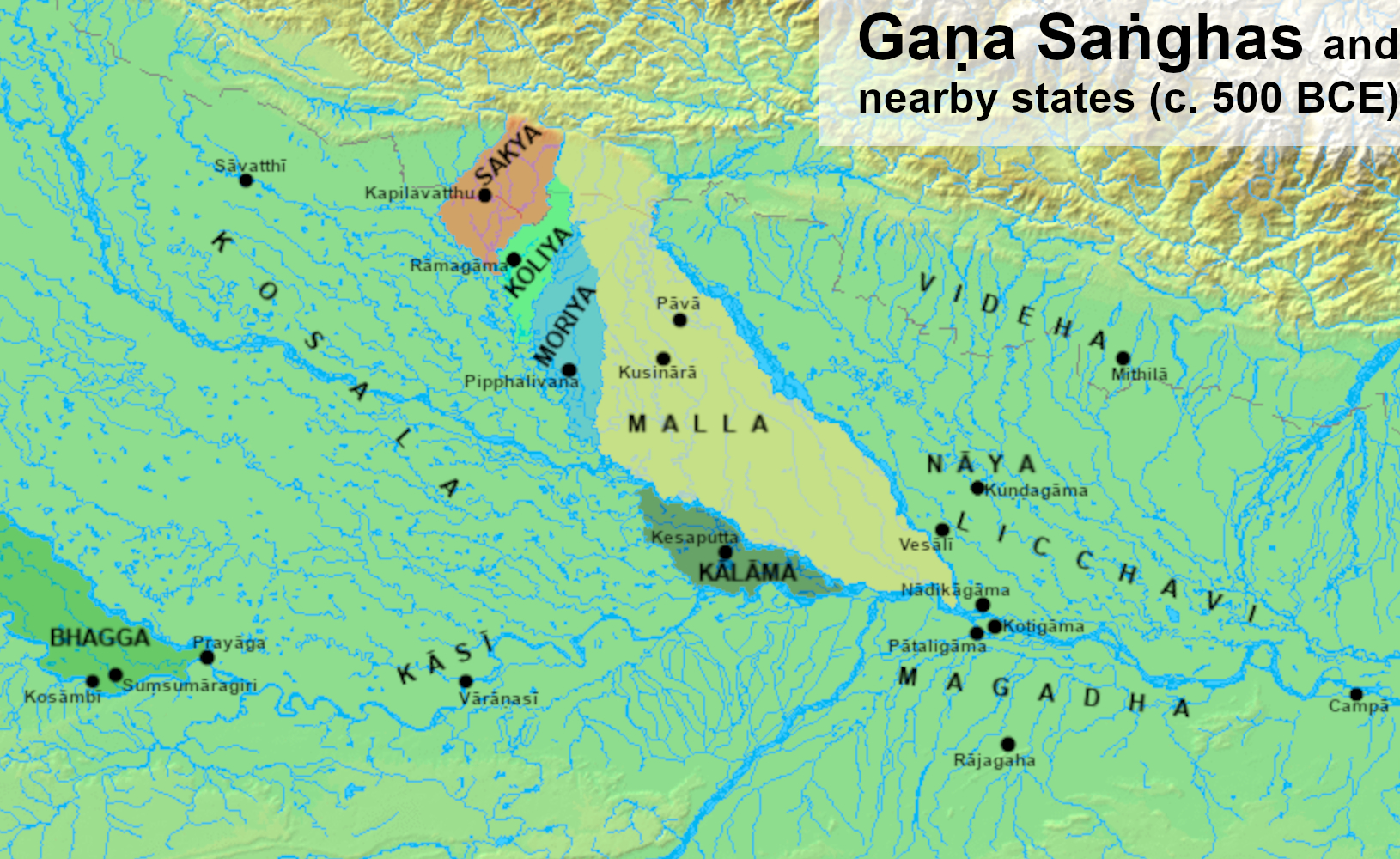
- Bhagga among the Gaṇasaṅghas

- The Mahajanapadas in the post-Vedic period. Bhagga was located between the Ganges and the Yamuna, between Vatsa, Kasi, and Kosala
- Capital: Suṃsumāragiri
- Common languages: Prakrit; Sanskrit
- Religion: Historical Vedic religion Buddhism; Jainism
- Government: Republic
- Rājā
- Historical era: Iron Age
  - Established: c. 7th century BCE
  - Conquered by Vatsa: c. 5th-4th century BCE
Succeeded by
Vatsa
- Today part of: India

Bhagga (Pāli: Bhagga; Sanskrit Bharga) was an ancient Indo-Aryan tribe of north-eastern South Asia whose existence is attested during the Iron Age. The Bhaggas were organised into a gaṇasaṅgha (an aristocratic oligarchic republic), presently referred to as the Bhagga Republic.

== Location ==
The Bhaggas lived between the Gangā and the Yamunā, in the near north of the Vatsa kingdom's capital of Kosāmbī, and to the west of the Kāsī kingdom's capital of Vārāṇasī. The northern neighbour of the Bhaggas was the kingdom of Kosala.

The Bhaggas lived far from the other republican Indo-Aryan tribes such as the Licchavikas, Mallakas, Moriyas, Koliyas, and Sakyas, who were located between the Himalayas and the lower course of the Gangā, with the kingdoms of Kāsī and Kosala separating Bhagga from these tribes.

The capital of the Bhaggas was Suṃsumāragiri.

== Name ==
The name of the Bhaggas is the Pali form of the name of the Bharga (Sanskrit: भर्ग) Indo-Aryan ethnic group mentioned in Sanskrit literature.

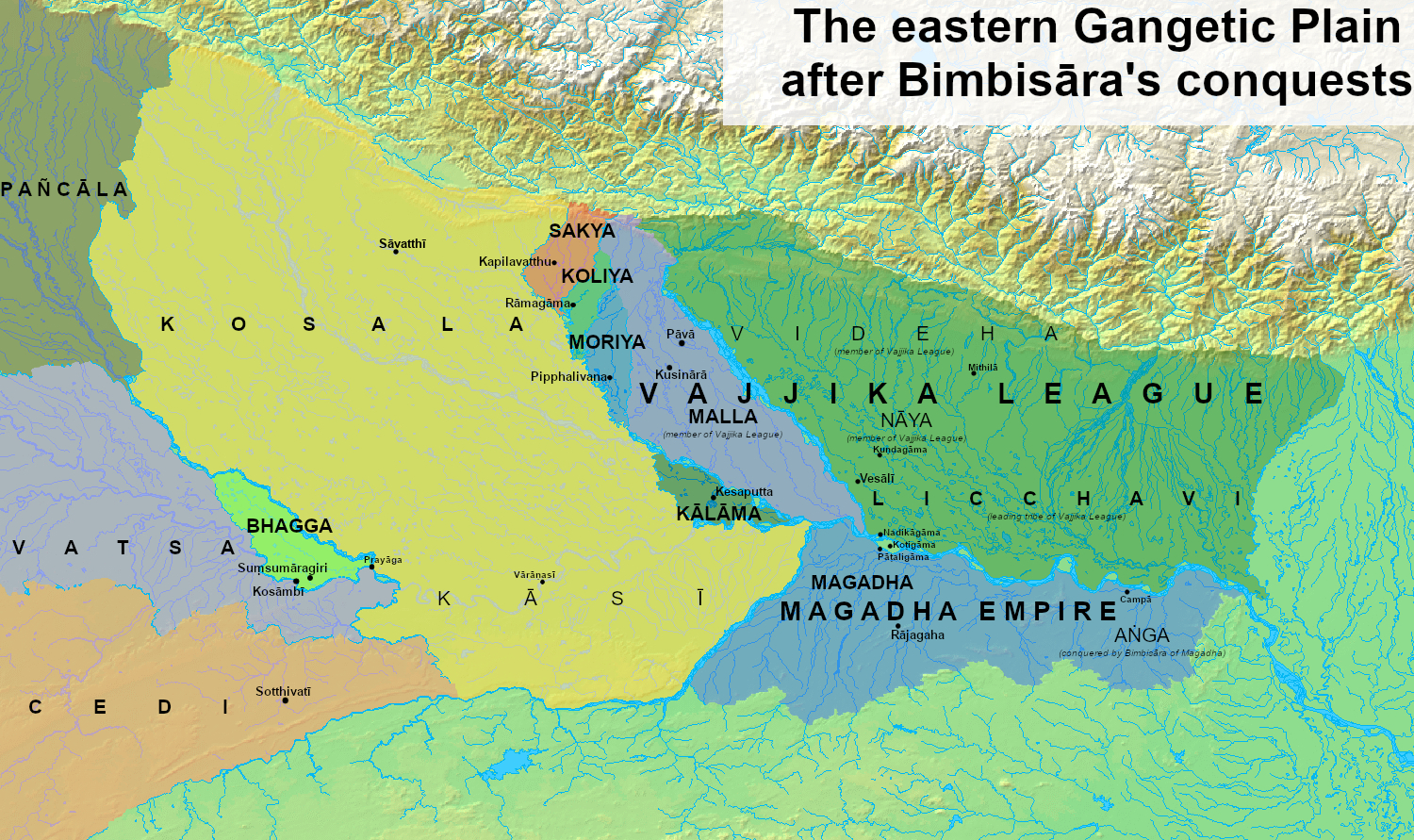
Map of the eastern Gangetic plain before Udayana's conquest of Bhagga

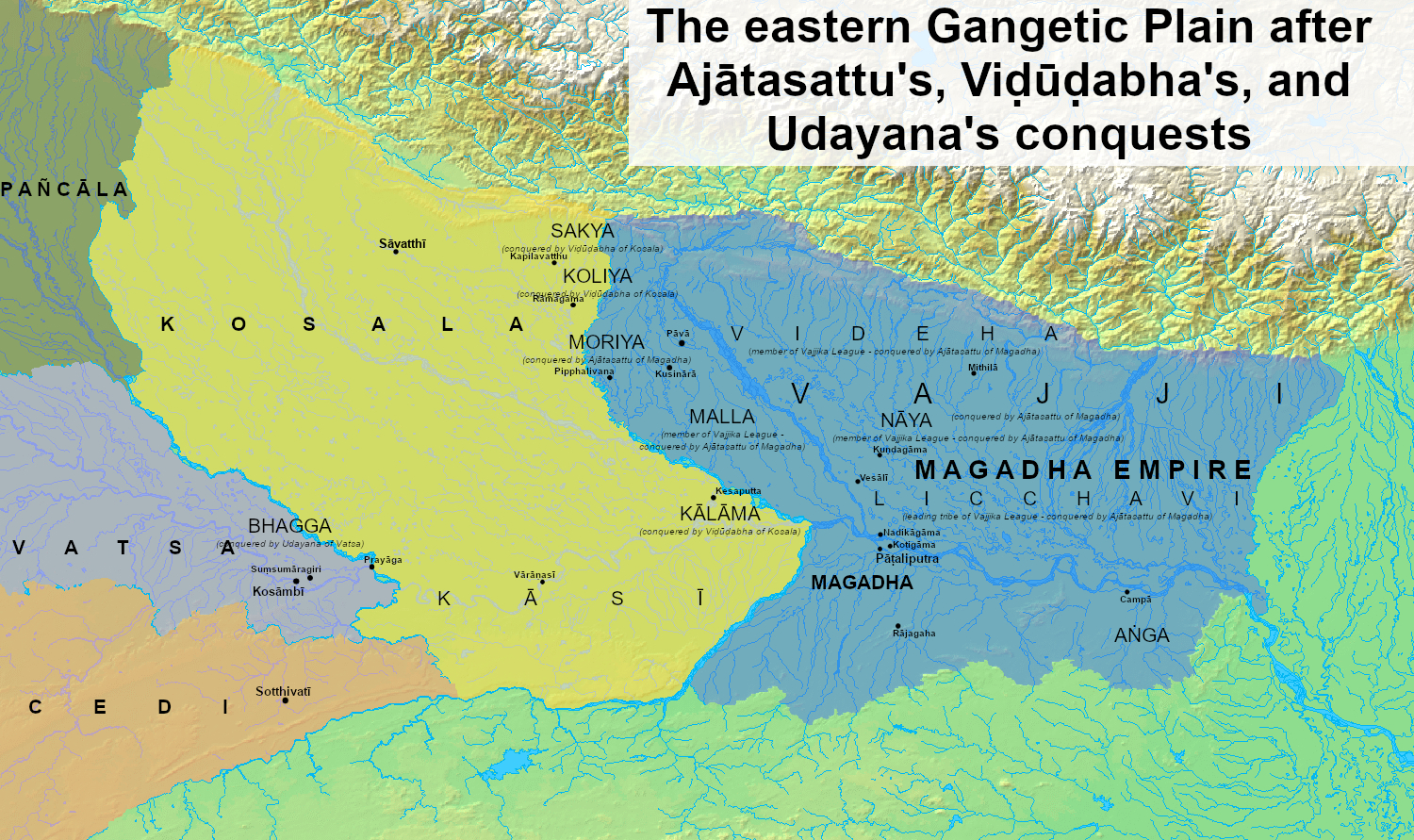
Map of the eastern Gangetic plain after Udayana's conquest of Bhagga

== History ==
The Mahabharata and the Harivansa states the close connection between the Vatsas and the Bhargas (Bhaggas).

The Bhaggas were dependencies of the kingdom of Vatsa, and therefore did not have sovereign rights concerning their external affairs and foreign policy although they were internally still organised as a republic. A prince of Vatsa lived in the Bhagga capital of Suṃsumāragiri as a viceroy of the king of Vatsa, who was the suzerain of the Bhaggas.

The Buddha visited Bhagga shortly after his Enlightenment, during the early phase of his preaching.

The Bhaggas had already been assimilated into Vatsa under the rule of the latter's king Udayana, and they were annexed by that kingdom under his successor around the time of the Buddha's death.

The Bhaggas were not among peoples who claimed a share of the Buddha's relics because they had stopped existing as an independent polity by the time of his death. Similarly, the Vaidehas and the Nāyikas did not claim a share of the relics because they were dependencies of the Licchavikas without their own sovereignty, and therefore could not put forth their own claim while the Licchavikas, the Mallakas, and the Sakyas could claim shares.

== Political and social organisation ==
=== Republican institutions ===
The Bhaggas were a kṣatriya tribe organised into a gaṇasaṅgha (an aristocratic oligarchic republic).

==== The Assembly ====
Like the other gaṇasaṅgha, the ruling body of the Bhagga republic was an Assembly of the kṣatriya elders who held the title of rājās (meaning "chiefs").

==== The Council ====
The Assembly met rarely, and the administration of the republic was instead in the hands of the Council, which was a smaller body of the Assembly composed of councillors selected from among the Assembly's members. The Council met more often than the Assembly.

==== The Consul ====
The Bhagga Assembly elected a consul rājā who presided over it and administered the republic with the help of the Council.

== Sources ==
- Sharma, J. P. (1968). Republics in Ancient India, C. 1500 B.C.-500 B.C. Leiden, Netherlands: E. J. Brill. ISBN 978-9-004-02015-3.
- Eggermont, P. H. L. (1966). Journal of the Economic and Social History of the Orient, Dec., 1966, Vol. 9, No. 3 (Dec., 1966), pp. 257-296. Leiden, Netherlands: E. J. Brill.
