= Malla (tribe) =

Republican confederacy in ancient India

Malla Republic
- c. 7th century BCE–c. 4th century BCE
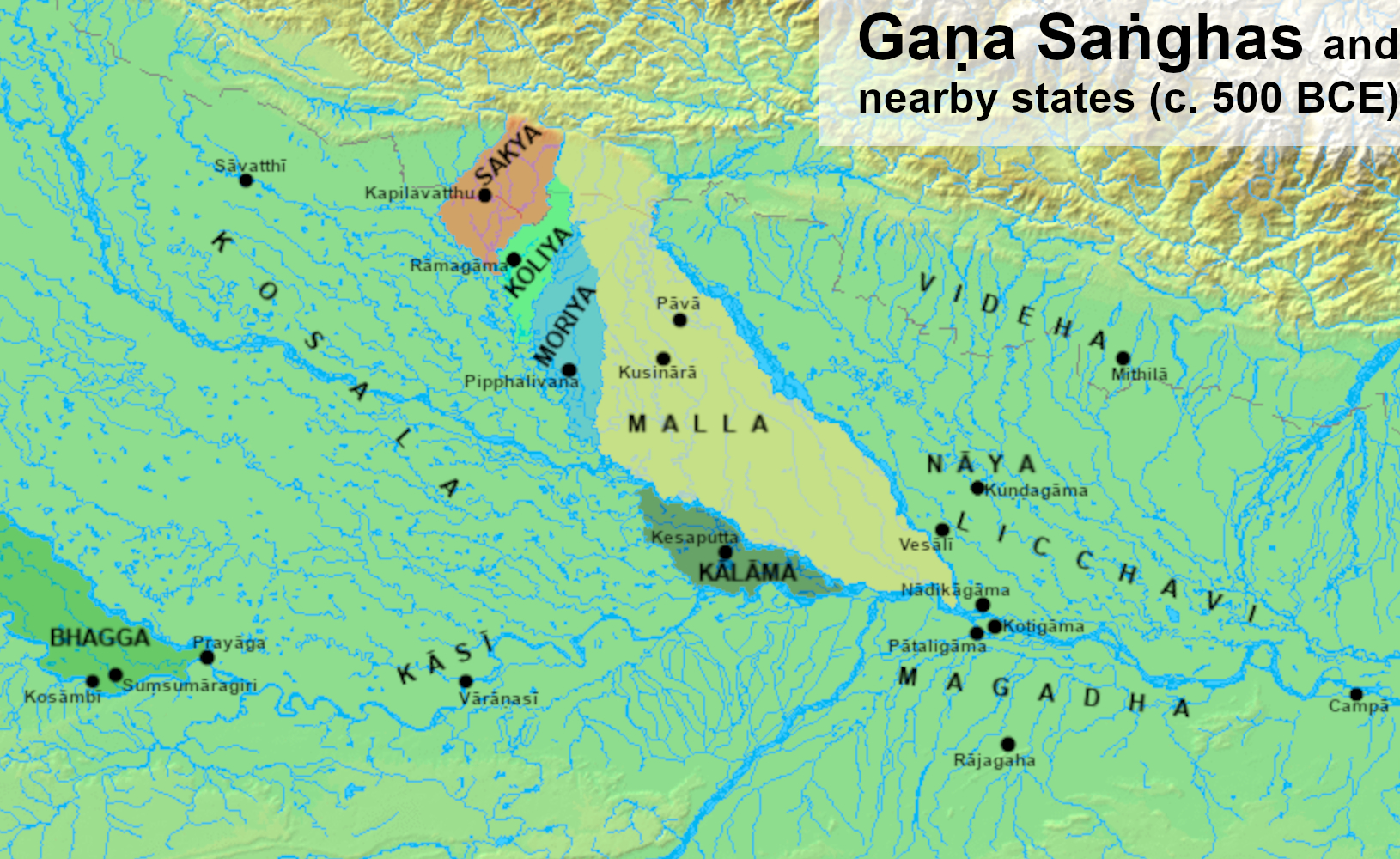
- Malla among the Gaṇasaṅghas

- Malla, Vajji (the dependencies of Licchavi within the Vajjika League), and other Mahajanapadas in the Post Vedic period
- Status: Republic of the Vajjika League
- Capital: Kusinārā; Pāvā
- Common languages: Prakrit
- Religion: Historical Vedic religion Jainism; Buddhism
- Government: Aristocratic Republic
- Gaṇa Mukhya
- Legislature: Sabhā
- Historical era: Iron Age
  - Established: c. 7th century BCE
  - Disestablished: c. 4th century BCE
| Succeeded by |
| Magadha |
- Today part of: India

Malla (Prakrit languages: 𑀫𑀮𑁆𑀮𑀈, romanized: Mallaī; Pali: Malla; Sanskrit: मल्ल, romanized: Malla) was an ancient Indo-Aryan tribe of north-eastern South Asia whose existence is attested during the Iron Age. The population of Malla was divided into two branches, each organised into a gaṇasaṅgha (an aristocratic oligarchic republic), presently referred to as the Malla Republics, which were part of the larger Vajjika League.

== Location ==
The Mallas lived in the region now covered by the Kushinagar district in India, although their precise borders are yet to be determined. The Mallas' neighbours to the east across the Sadānirā river were the Licchavikas, their neighbours to the west were the Sakyas, Koliyas, Moriyas, and Kauśalyas, the southern neighbours of the Mallas were the Kālāmas and the Gaṅgā river, and the northern Malla borders were the Himālaya mountains. The territory of the Mallas was a tract of land between the Vaidehas and the Kauśalyas.

The territories of the two Malla republics were divided by the river named Hiraññavatī in Pāli, and Hiraṇyavatī in Sanskrit, and the two Malla republics respectively had their capitals at Kusinārā, identified with the modern village of Kāsiā in Kushinagar, and at Pāvā (now known as Fazilnagar). Kusinārā was close to the Sakya capital of Kapilavatthu to its north-east, and Pāvā was close to the Licchavika capital of Vesālī.

== Name ==
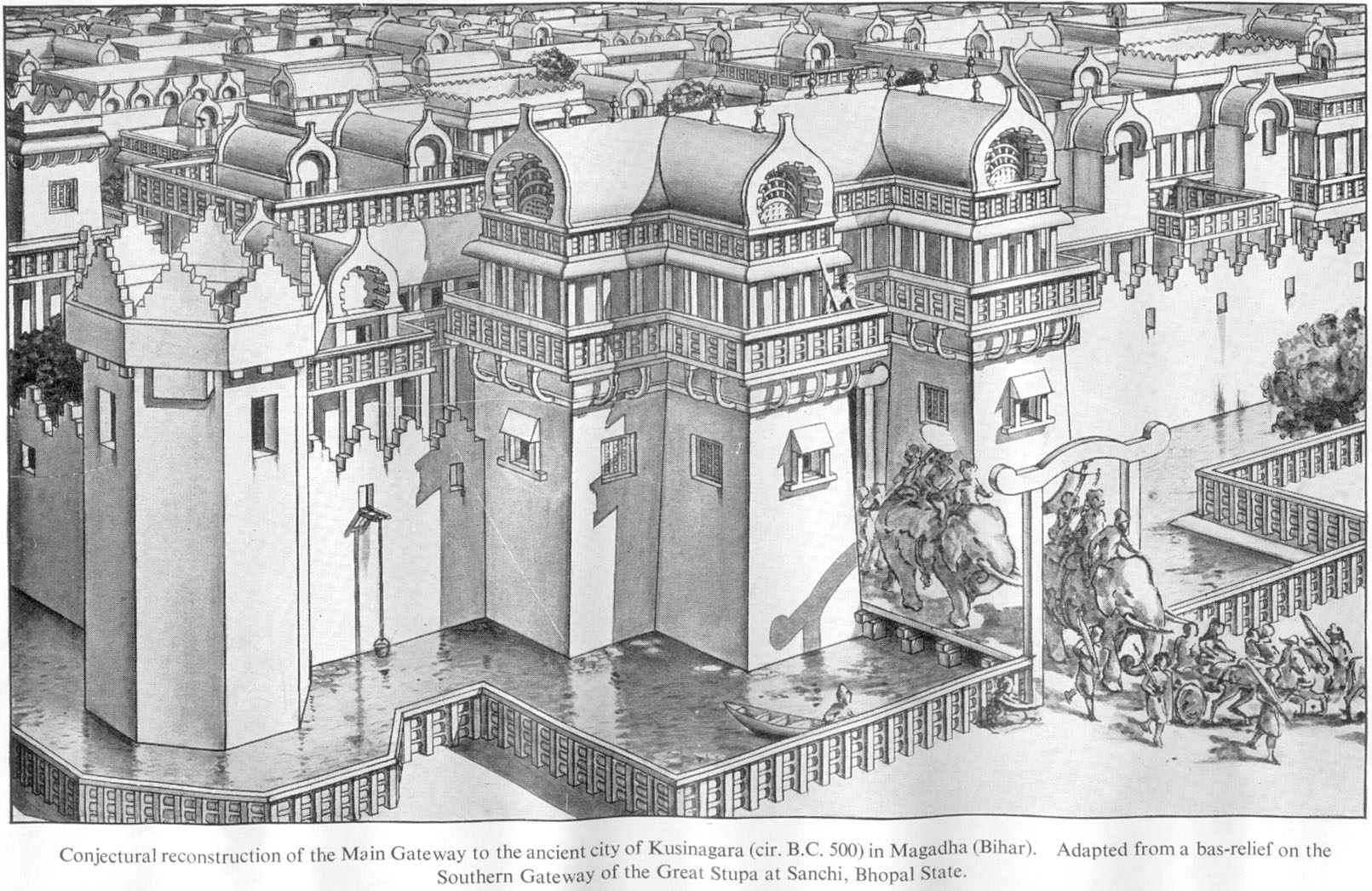
Conjectural reconstruction of the main gate of Kusinārā, capital of one of the Malla republics, circa 500 BCE adapted from a relief at Sanchi.

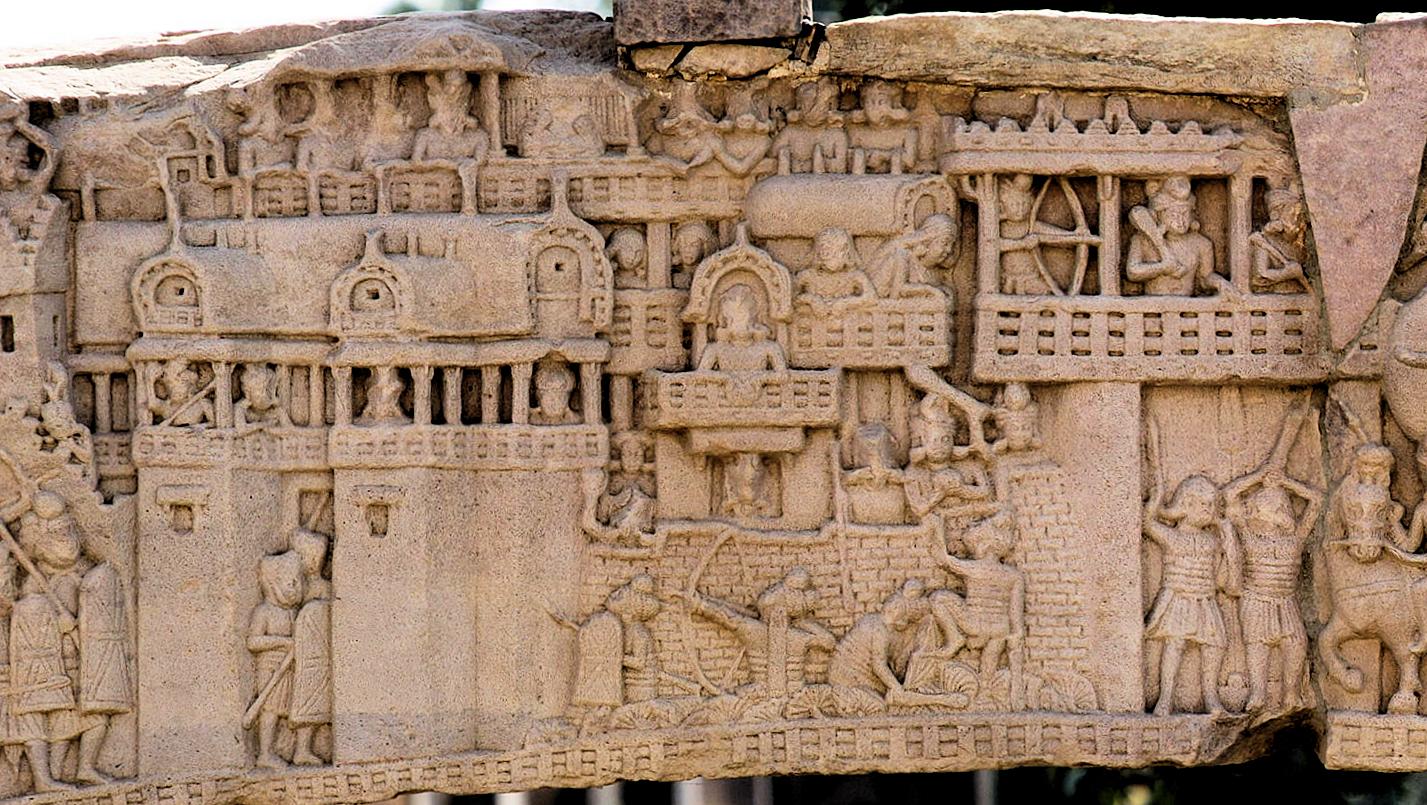
City of Kusinārā in the 5th century BCE according to a 1st-century BCE frieze in Sanchi Stupa 1 Southern Gate.

The Mallas are called Malla in Pāli texts, Mallaī in Jain Prākrit texts, and Malla in Sanskrit texts.

== History ==
=== Statehood ===
The Mallas were an Indo-Aryan tribe in the eastern Gangetic plain in the Greater Magadha cultural region. Similarly to the other populations of the Greater Magadha cultural area, Mallas were initially not fully Brahmanised despite being an Indo-Aryan people, but, like the Vaidehas, they later became Brahmanised and adopted the Vāseṭṭha (in Pali) or Vaśiṣṭha (in Sanskrit) gotra. At some point in time, the Mallas became divided into two separate republics with their respective capitals at Kusinārā and Pāvā, possibly due to internal trouble, and henceforth the relations between the two Malla republics remained uncordial. Both Malla republics nevertheless became members of the Licchavi-led Vajjika League, within which, unlike the Vaidehas, they maintained their own sovereign rights because they had not been conquered by the Licchavikas, and the Mallas held friendly relations with the Licchavikas, the Vaidehas, and the Nāyikas who were the other members of this league.

However occasional tensions between the Mallas and the Licchavikas did arise, such as in the case of the man named Bandhula, a Malla who, thanks to his education received in Takṣaśilā, had offered his services as a general to the Kauśalya king Pasenadi so as to maintain the good relations between the Mallas and Kosala. Bandhula, along with his wife Mallikā, violated the Abhiseka-Pokkharaṇī sacred tank of the Licchavikas, which resulted in armed hostilities between the Kauśalyas and the Licchavikas. Bandhula was later treacherously murdered along with his sons by Pasenadi, and, in retaliation, some Mallas helped Pasenadi's son Viḍūḍabha usurp the throne of Kosala to avenge the death of Bandhula, after which Pasenadi fled from Kosala and died in front of the gates of the Māgadhī capital of Rājagaha.

The Buddha arrived in Pāvā shortly after the Mallas there had inaugurated their new santhāgāra, which they had named Ubbhataka. From Pāvā, the Buddha and his followers went to Kusinārā, and on the way they crossed two rivers, the first one being named Kakutthā in Pali and Kukustā in Sanskrit, and the second one being the Hiraññavatī which separated the two Malla republics. The Buddha spent his final days in the Malla republic of Kusinārā, and when he sent Ānanda to inform the Mallas of Kusinārā of his impending death, Ānanda found the Malla Council holding a meeting about public affairs in their santhāgāra.

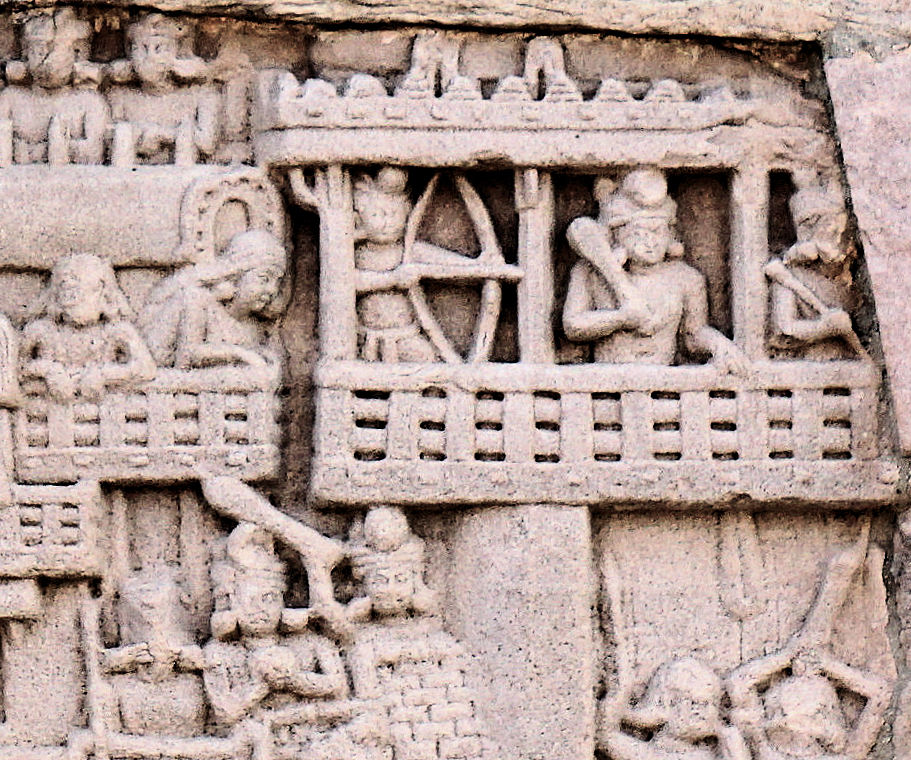
The Mallas defending the city of Kusinārā. Reflective of the frieze at Stupa 1, Southern Gateway, Sanchi, 1st century BCE to 1st century CE.

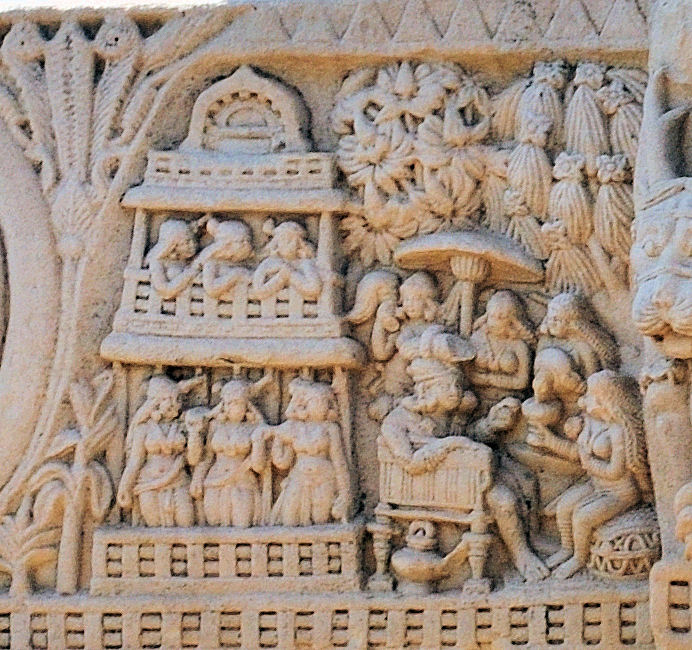
Leader of the Mallas of Kusinārā, under siege by the seven kings during the War of the Relics. Reflective of the frieze at Sanchi.

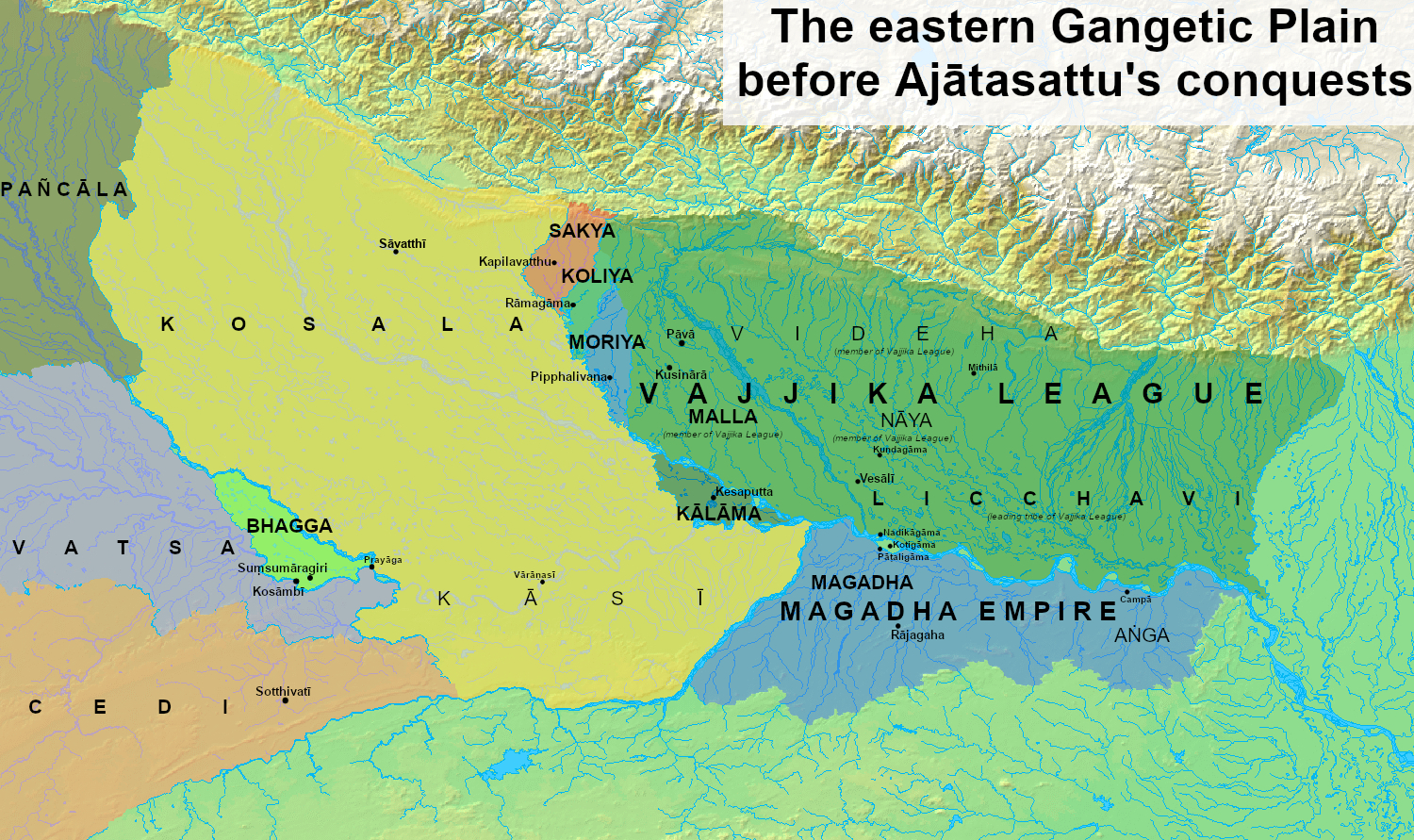
Map of the eastern Gangetic plain before Ajatashatru's conquests
(Malla shown within the Vajjika League)

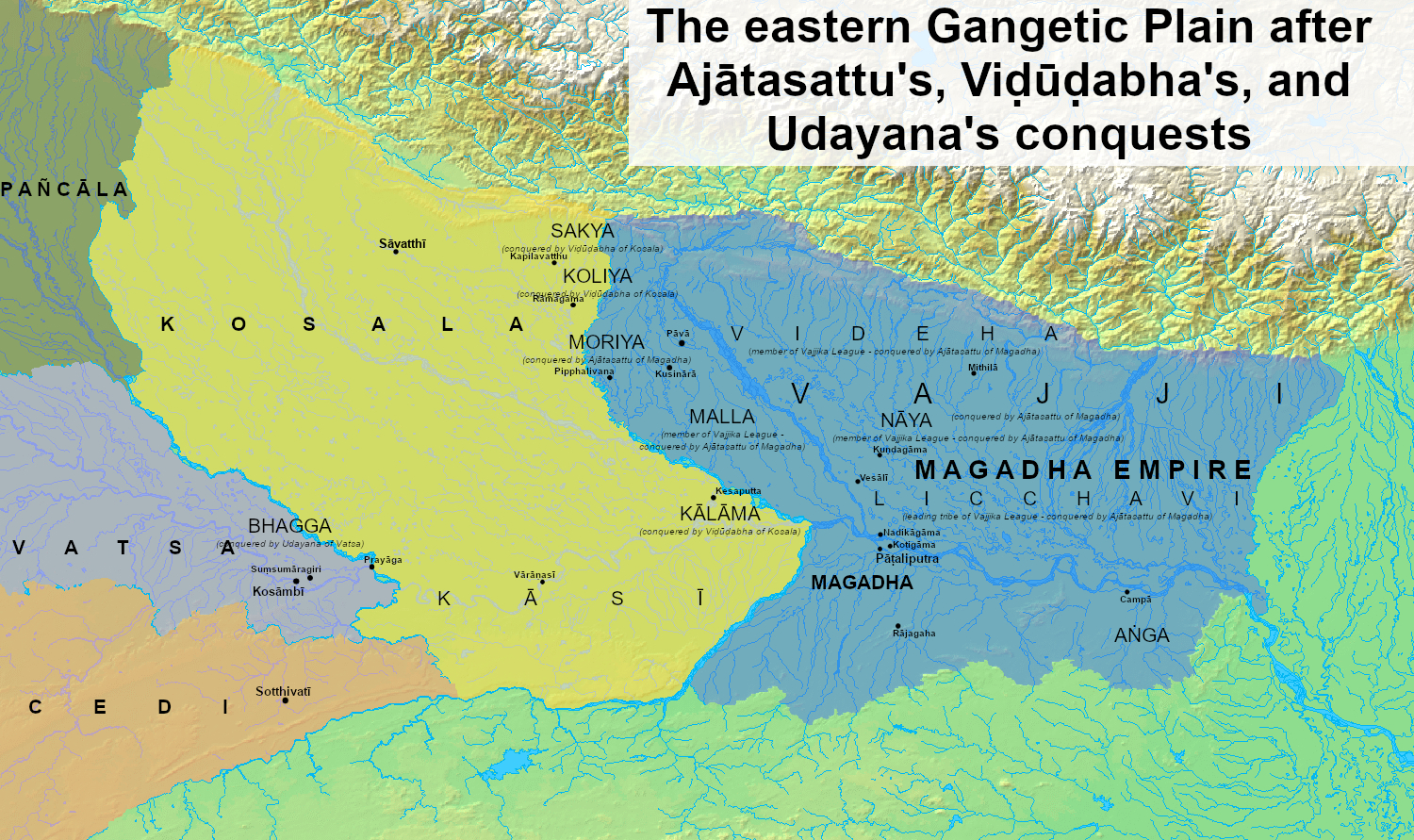
Map of the eastern Gangetic plain after Ajatashatru's conquest of the Vajjika League and of Moriya

When Ānanda went again to the Mallas of Kusinārā to inform them of the Buddha's passing, he found them this time holding a meeting to discuss the funeral ceremony of the Buddha in the santhāgāra. After the Buddha's cremation, his remains were honoured in the santhāgāra of Kusinārā for seven days, and it was in this santhāgāra that the Mallas of Kusinārā received the envoys of Magadha, Licchavi, Shakya, Buli, Koliya, the Mallas of Pāvā, and Moriya, who all went to Kusinārā to claim their shares of the Buddha's relics. The Licchavikas, the Mallas, and the Sakyas were able to claim shares of the relics, but the other members of the Vajjika League, the Vaidehas and the Nāyikas, were not among the states claiming a share because they were dependencies of the Licchavikas without their own sovereignty, and therefore could not put forth their own claim while Licchavi could. The Mallas of Pāvā were the first ones to arrive with an army to Kusinārā, and they put forth their claim to the relics in rude and hostile terms. In the end, each Malla republic obtained a share of the Buddha's relics and built their own stūpas and gave their own feasts to commemorate this event.

After the death of the 24th Jain Tīrthaṅkara, Mahāvīra, the Mallas and the Licchavis jointly instituted a festival of lights to commemorate his passing.

== Decline ==
The relations of the Licchavikas, who led the Vajjika League which the Mallas were part of, with their southern neighbour, the kingdom of Magadha, were initially good, and the wife of the Māgadhī king Bimbisāra was the Vesālia princess Vāsavī, who was the daughter of the Licchavika Nāyaka Sakala's son Siṃha. There were nevertheless occasional tensions between Licchavi and Magadha, such as the competition at the Malla capital of Kusinārā over acquiring the relics of the Buddha after his death.

In another case, the Licchavikas once invaded Māgadhī territory from across the Gaṅgā, and at some point the relations between Magadha and Licchavi permanently deteriorated as result of a grave offence committed by the Licchavikas towards the Māgadhī king Bimbisāra.

The hostilities between Licchavi and Magadha continued under the rule of Ajatashatru, who was Bimbisāra's son with another Licchavika princess, Vāsavī, after he had killed Bimbisāra and usurped the throne of Magadha. Eventually Licchavi supported a revolt against Ajatashatru by his younger step-brother and the governor of Aṅga, Vehalla, who was the son of Bimbisāra by another Licchavika wife of his, Cellanā, a daughter of Ceḍaga, who was the head of both the Licchavi republic and the Vajjika League; Bimbisāra had chosen Vehalla as his successor following Ajatashatru's falling out of his favour after the latter had been caught conspiring against him, and the Licchavikas had attempted to place Vehalla on the throne of Magadha after Ajatashatru's usurpation and had allowed Vehalla to use their capital Vesālī as base for his revolt. After the failure of this rebellion, Vehalla sought refuge at his grandfather's place in the Licchavika and Vajjika capital of Vesālī, following which Ajatashatru repeatedly attempted to negotiate with the Licchavikas-Vajjikas. After Ajatashatru's repeated negotiation attempts ended in failure, he declared war on the Vajjika League in 484 BCE.

Tensions between Licchavi and Magadha were exacerbated by the handling of the joint Māgadhī-Licchavika border post of Koṭigāma on the Gaṅgā by the Licchavika-led Vajjika League who would regularly collect all valuables from Koṭigāma and leave none to the Māgadhīs. Therefore Ajatashatru decided to destroy the Vajjika League in retaliation, but also because, as an ambitious empire-builder whose mother Vāsavī was Licchavika princess of Vaidehī descent, he was interested in the territory of the former Mahā-Videha kingdom which by then was part of the Vajjika League. Ajatashatru's hostility towards the Vajjika League was also the result of the differing forms of political organisation between Magadha and the Vajjika League, with the former being monarchical and the latter being republican, not unlike the opposition of the ancient Greek kingdom of Sparta to the democratic form of government in Athens, and the hostilities between the ancient Macedonian king Philip II to the Athenian and Theban republics.

As important members of the Vajjika League, the Malla republics were also threatened by Ajatashatru, and the Vajjika Gaṇa Mukhya Ceḍaga held war consultations with the rājās of the Licchavikas and Mallikas before the fight started. The Mallas therefore fought on the side of the other confederate tribes of the league against Magadha. The military forces of the Vajjika League were initially too strong for Ajatashatru to be successful against them, and it required him having recourse to diplomacy and intrigues over the span of a decade to finally defeat the Vajjika League by 468 BCE and annex its territories, including Licchavi, Videha and Nāya, to the kingdom of Magadha. The Mallas also became part of Ajatashatru's Māgadhī empire, although they were allowed a limited degree of autonomy in terms of their internal administration, and they stopped existing as a republican tribe when the Maurya dynasty ruled Magadha or shortly after.

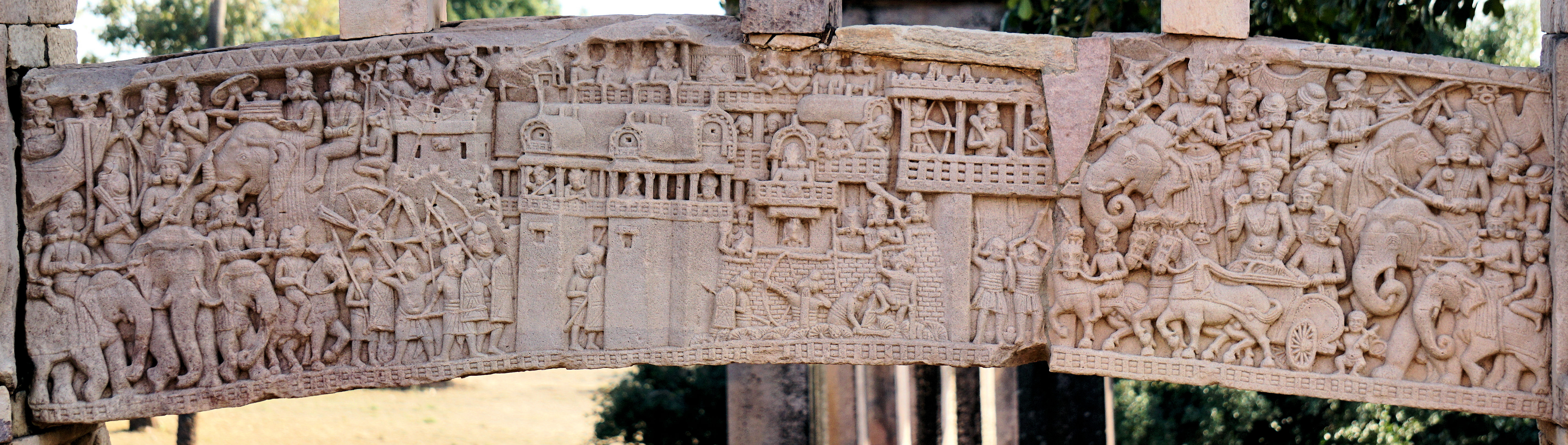
War over the Buddha's Relics held by the city of Kusinārā, South Gate, Stupa no.1, Sanchi.

== Social and political organisation ==
=== Republican institutions ===
==== The Assembly ====
Just like a Vaidehas, Licchavikas, and Nāyikas, the Mallas were a kṣatriya tribe, and each of the republics of the Mallas were organised into a gaṇasaṅgha (an aristocratic oligarchic republic), which had a ruling Assembly consisting of the heads of the kṣatriya clans belonging to the Vāseṭṭha/Vaśiṣṭha gotra, and who were given the title of rājās. The position of rājā was hereditary, and after the death of one of them, his eldest son would succeed him by being introduced to the Assembly following a ceremony held, for the Mallas of Kusinārā, at the Makuṭa-bandhana, which was a shrine holding an important political meaning for the republic (the Mallas of Pāvā had a similar shrine of their own). Similarly to that of the Licchavikas, the Malla General Assembly had a large number of members, with the meetings being only rarely attended by all of them.

The Malla republics, like the other gaṇasaṅgha of the Vajjika League, held their Assembly and Council meetings in their own santhāgāras.

==== The Councils ====
Like the Licchavikas, the Mallas' Assemblies met rarely while the Assemblies' inner councils, the Malla Councils, consisting of four members for the Mallas of Kusinārā and of five members for the Mallas of Pāvā, met more often and performed the public administration within each republic. These Councils were the sovereign bodies of the Malla republics.

=== Customs ===
The Manusmṛiti refers to the Mallas as Vrāṭyakṣatriyas, that is kṣatriyas who had not been initiated, because they did not practice orthodox Vedic traditions.

== See also ==
- Kingdoms of Ancient India
- Mallabhum

== Sources ==
- Sankrityayan, Rahul (2010). "Buddhacharya"- Life and Teachings of the Buddha (in Hindi). Gautam Book Centre. ISBN 9789380292175.
- Sharma, J. P. (1968). Republics in Ancient India, C. 1500 B.C.-500 B.C. Leiden, Netherlands: E. J. Brill. ISBN 978-9-004-02015-3.
