= Moriya (tribe) =

Republican tribe in Iron-Age India

Moriya Republic
- c. 7th century BCE–c. 5th century BCE
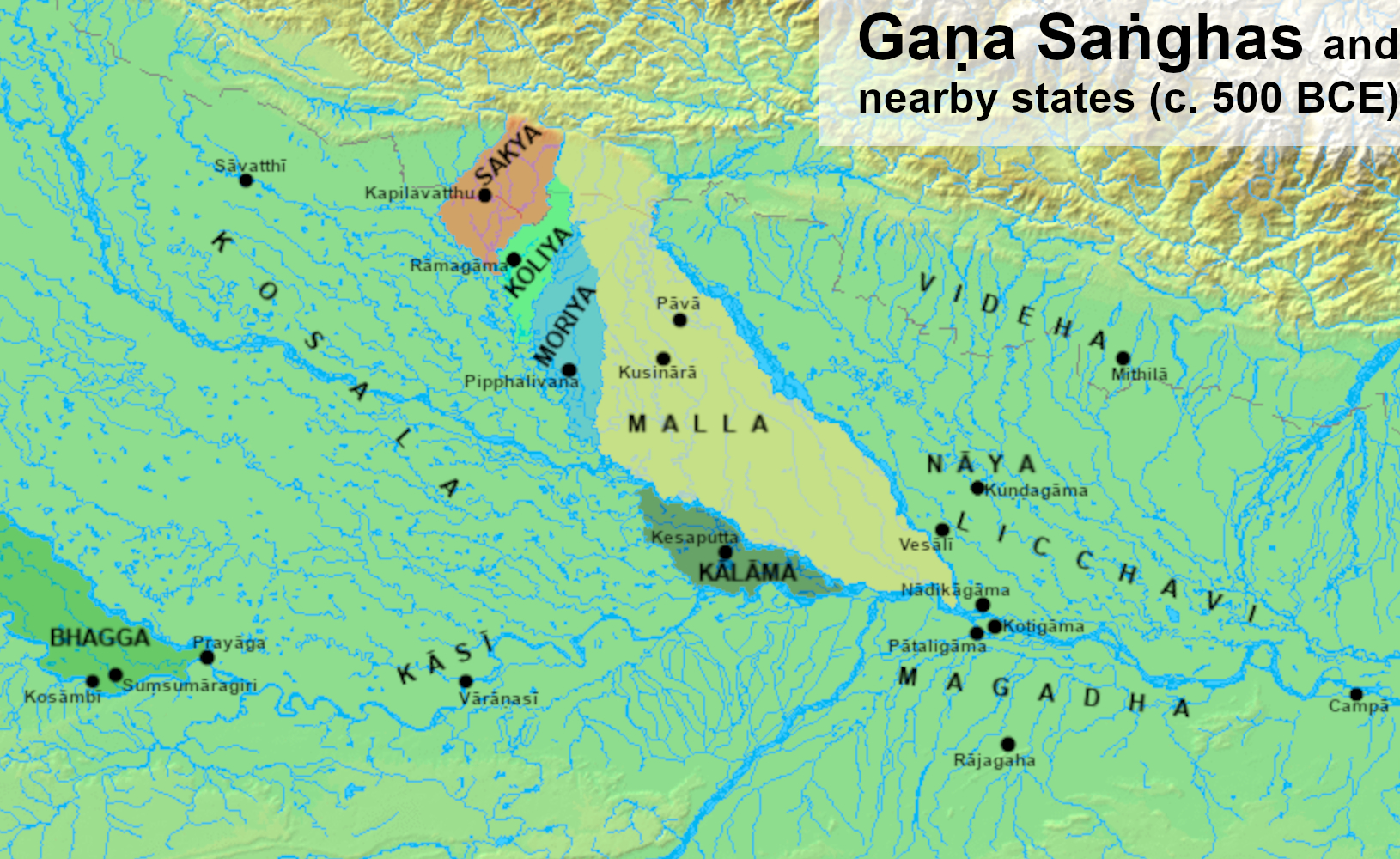
- Moriya among the Gaṇasaṅghas

- The Mahajanapadas in the post-Vedic period. Moriya was to the east of Sakya, northeast of Kosala, and west of Malla.
- Capital: Pipphalivana
- Common languages: Prakrit; Sanskrit
- Religion: Historical Vedic religion Buddhism; Jainism
- Government: Aristocratic republic
- Rājā
- Historical era: Iron Age
  - Established: c. 7th century BCE
  - Conquered by Ajatashatru of Magadha c. 468 BCE: c. 5th century BCE
Succeeded by
Magadha
- Today part of: India; Nepal

Moriya (Pāli: Moriya) was an ancient Indo-Aryan tribe of northeastern South Asia whose existence is attested during the Iron Age. The Moriyas were organised into a gaṇasaṅgha (an aristocratic oligarchic republic), presently referred to as the Moriya Republic.

== Location ==
The Moriyas lived to the northeast of Kosala, from which they were separated by the Anomā or Rāptī river. The Moriyas' western neighbours were the Koliyas, while the Mallas lived to their east, and the Sarayū river was their southern border.

The capital of the Moriyas was Pipphalivana, which the 7th century CE Chinese pilgrim Xuanzang later referred to by the name of Nyagrodhavana.

== Name ==
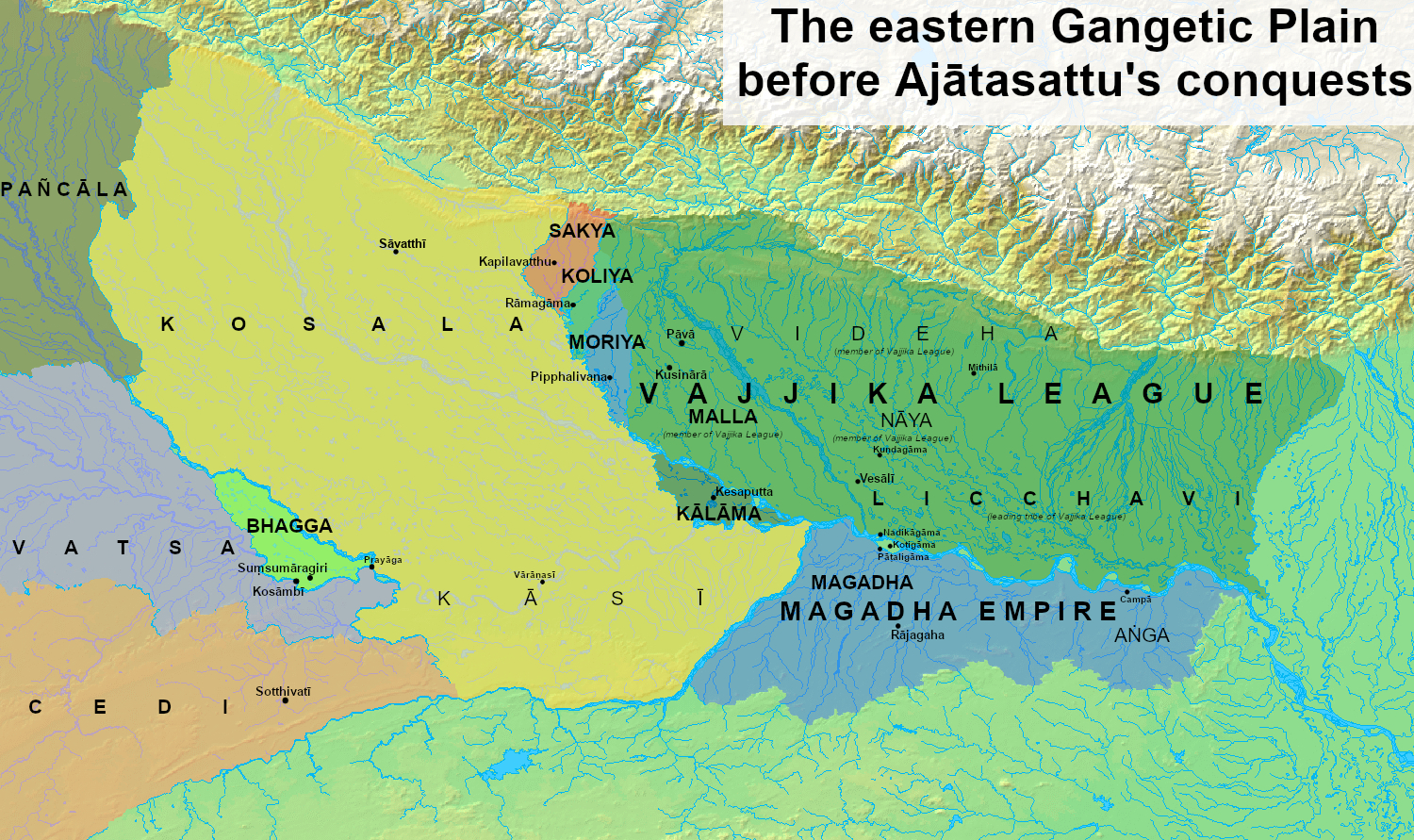
Map of the eastern Gangetic plain before Ajatashatru's conquest of Moriya and of the Vajjika League

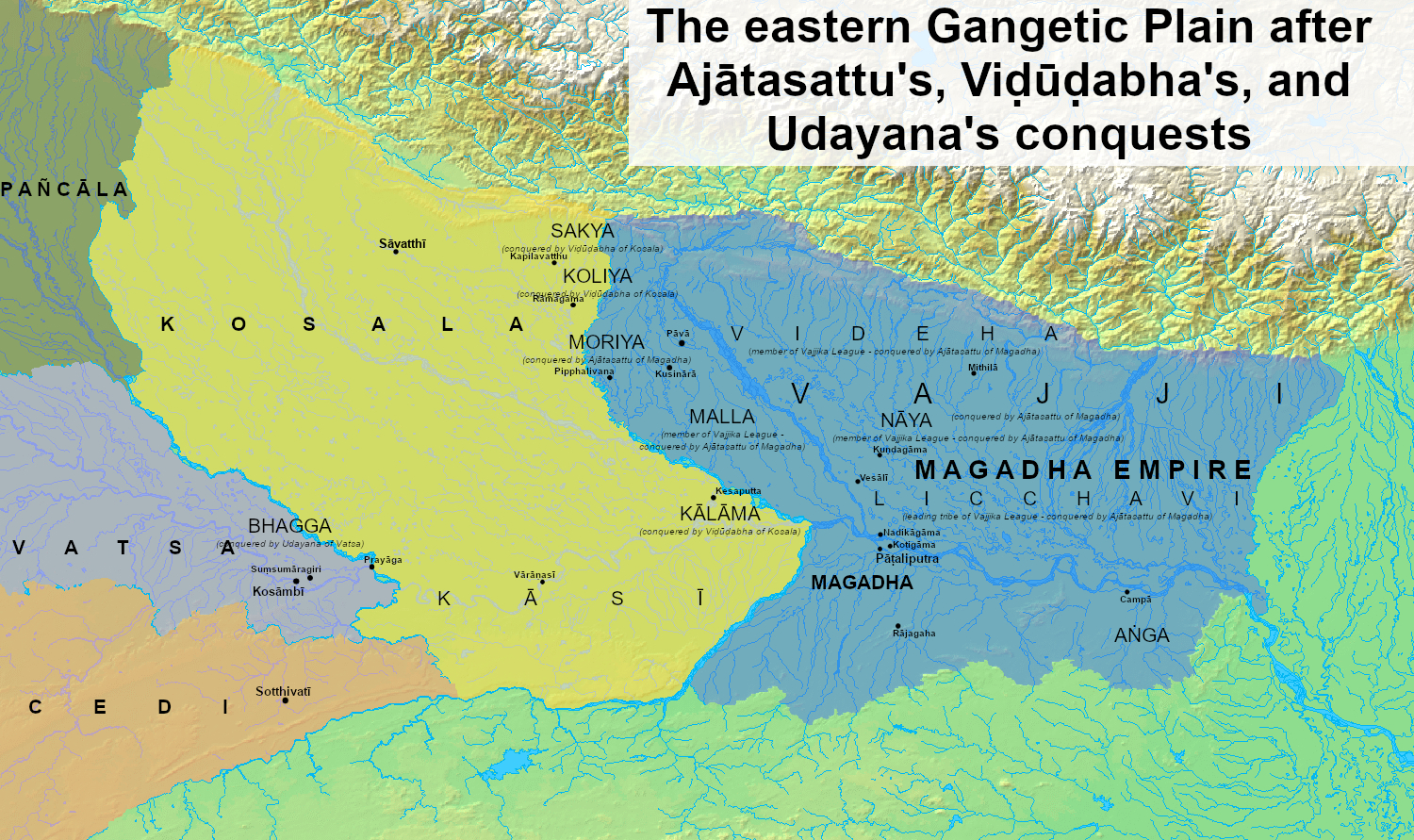
Map of the eastern Gangetic plain after Ajatashatru's conquest of Moriya and of the Vajjika League

The Moriyas originally obtained their name from the mayura (peacock) because the peacock was their totem.

== History ==
Like the other republican tribes neighbouring them, the Moriyas were an Indo-Aryan tribe in the eastern Gangetic plain in the Greater Magadha cultural region.

After the death of the Buddha, the Moriyas claimed a share of his relics from the Mallas of Kusinārā, in whose territory he had died and had been cremated. The Moriyas received the embers from the Buddha's cremation, which they then enclosed within a stūpa in their capital of Pipphalivana.

King Ajatashatru of Magadha annexed The Moriyas soon after he had annexed the Vajjika League.

=== Legacy ===
According to Buddhist tradition, the Moriya tribe were the ancestors of the Maurya dynasty who under the leadership of Chandragupta Maurya in the 4th century BCE seized power in Magadha. Chandragupta and his descendants would expand the Magadha empire so that it at one point ruled most of South Asia.

Under the reign of Chandragupta's grandson Asoka, who was a patron of Buddhism, Buddhist writers attempted to connect Asoka to the Buddha by claiming that his ancestral tribe, the Moriyas, were descended from Sakyas who had fled from the Kauśalya king Viḍūḍabha's annexation of their state by fleeing into the mountains. The record of the oldest Buddhist texts, according to which both the Moriyas and the Sakyas were among the tribes who claimed a share of the Buddha's relics from the Mallas of Kusinārā, however shows that the Moriyas were contemporaneous with the Sakyas, and therefore already existed before the destruction of the Sakya republic; the geographical location of the Moriya republic, which was further to the south of Sakya, furthermore counters the claim that the Moriyas were descended from Sakyas who had fled into the Himālaya mountains, which were to the north of the Sakya state.

== Political and social organisation ==
=== Republican institutions ===
The Moriyas were a kṣatriya tribe organised into a gaṇasaṅgha (an aristocratic oligarchic republic).

==== The Assembly ====
Like the other gaṇasaṅghas, the ruling body of the Moriya republic was an Assembly of the kṣatriya elders who held the title of rājās (meaning "rulers"), whose sons were the rājakumāras ("princes").

==== The Council ====
The Assembly met rarely, and the administration of the republic was instead in the hands of the Council, which was a smaller body of the Assembly composed of councillors selected from the membership of the Assembly. The Council met more often than the Assembly and was directly in charge of administering the republic.

==== The Consul ====
The Moriya Assembly elected from among the rājās a chief who would be the head of the republic and run its administration with the help of the Council.

== Sources ==
- Bronkhorst, Johannes (2007). Bronkhorst, J. (2007). Greater Magadha: Studies in the Culture of Early India. Boston: Brill Publishers. doi:10.1163/ej.9789004157194.i-416. ISBN 9789047419655.
- Cunningham, Alexander (1871). The Ancient Geography of India: I. The Buddhist Period, Including the Campaigns of Alexander, and the Travels of Hwen-Thsang. London: Trübner and Company. pp. 430–433.
- Fleet, JF (1906). "XXIV:The Tradition about the Corporeal Relics of Buddha". Journal of the Royal Asiatic Society of Great Britain & Ireland: 655–671. doi:10.1017/S0035869X00034857.
- Kapoor, Subodh (2002). Encyclopaedia of Ancient Indian Geography. Vol. 2. New Delhi: Cosmo Publications. ISBN 978-8177552997.
- Levman, Bryan Geoffrey (2014). "Cultural Remnants of the Indigenous Peoples in the Buddhist Scriptures". Buddhist Studies Review. 30 (2): 145–180. doi:10.1558/bsrv.v30i2.145.
- Mookerji, Radha Kumud (1988). Chandragupta Maurya and His Times (4th ed.). Madras: Motilal Banarsidass. ISBN 8120804333.
- Sharma, Jagdish Prasad (1968). Republics in Ancient India, c. 1500 B.C.-500 B.C. Leiden: Brill Publishers. ISBN 978-9004020153.
- Singh, Upinder (2016), A History of Ancient and Early Medieval India: From the Stone Age to the 12th Century, Pearson Education, ISBN 978-93-325-6996-6
