= Koliya =

Republican tribe confederacy in Iron-Age India

- c. 7th century BCE–c. 5th century BCE
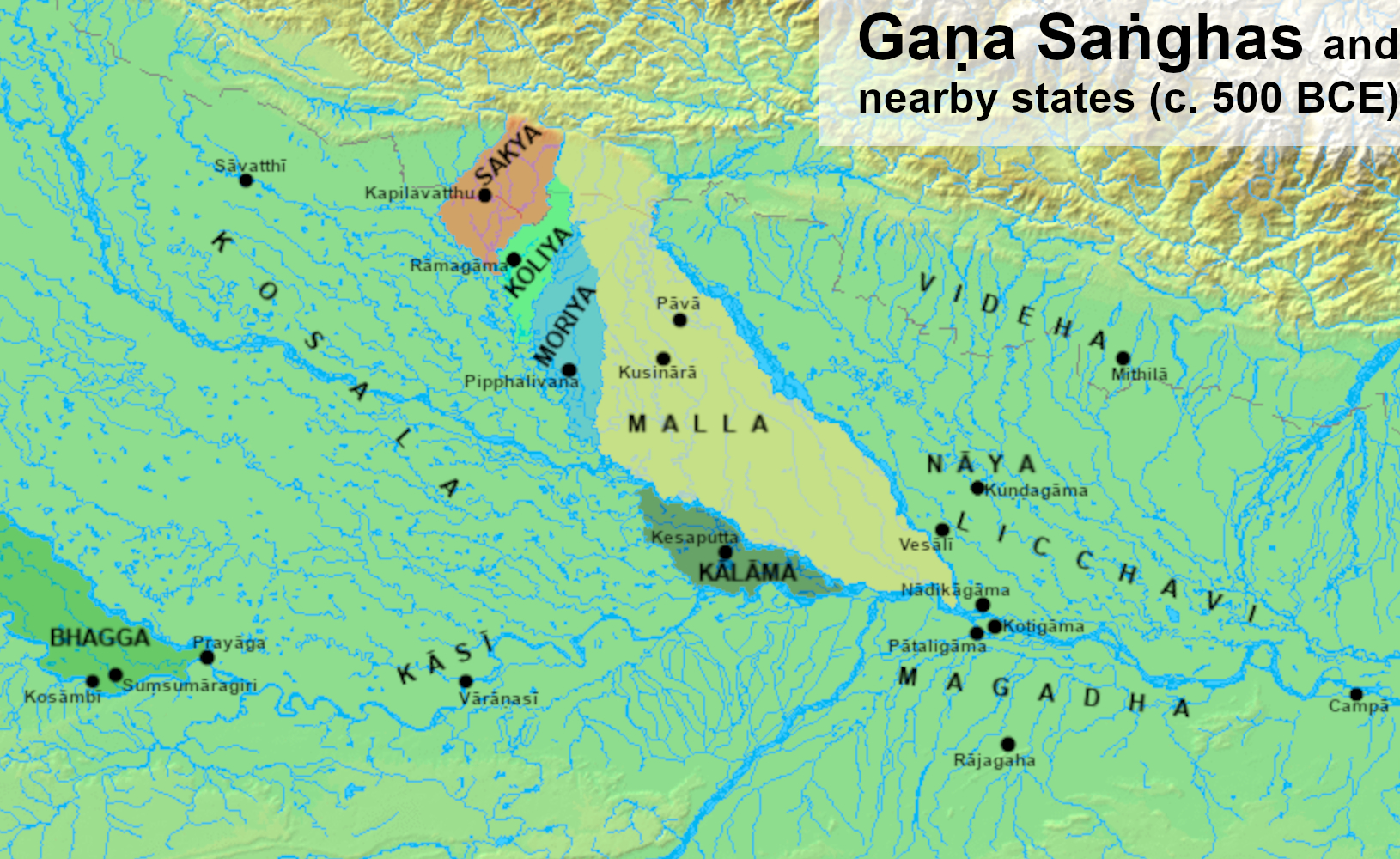
- Koliya among the Gaṇasaṅghas

- The Mahajanapadas in the post-Vedic period. Koliya was to the east of Sakya
- Capital: Rāmagāma
- Common languages: Prakrit; Sanskrit
- Religion: Historical Vedic religion Buddhism; Jainism
- Government: Aristocratic Republic
- Rājā
- Historical era: Iron Age
  - Established: c. 7th century BCE
  - Conquered by Viḍūḍabha of Kosala: c. 5th century BCE
Succeeded by
Kosala
- Today part of: India; Nepal

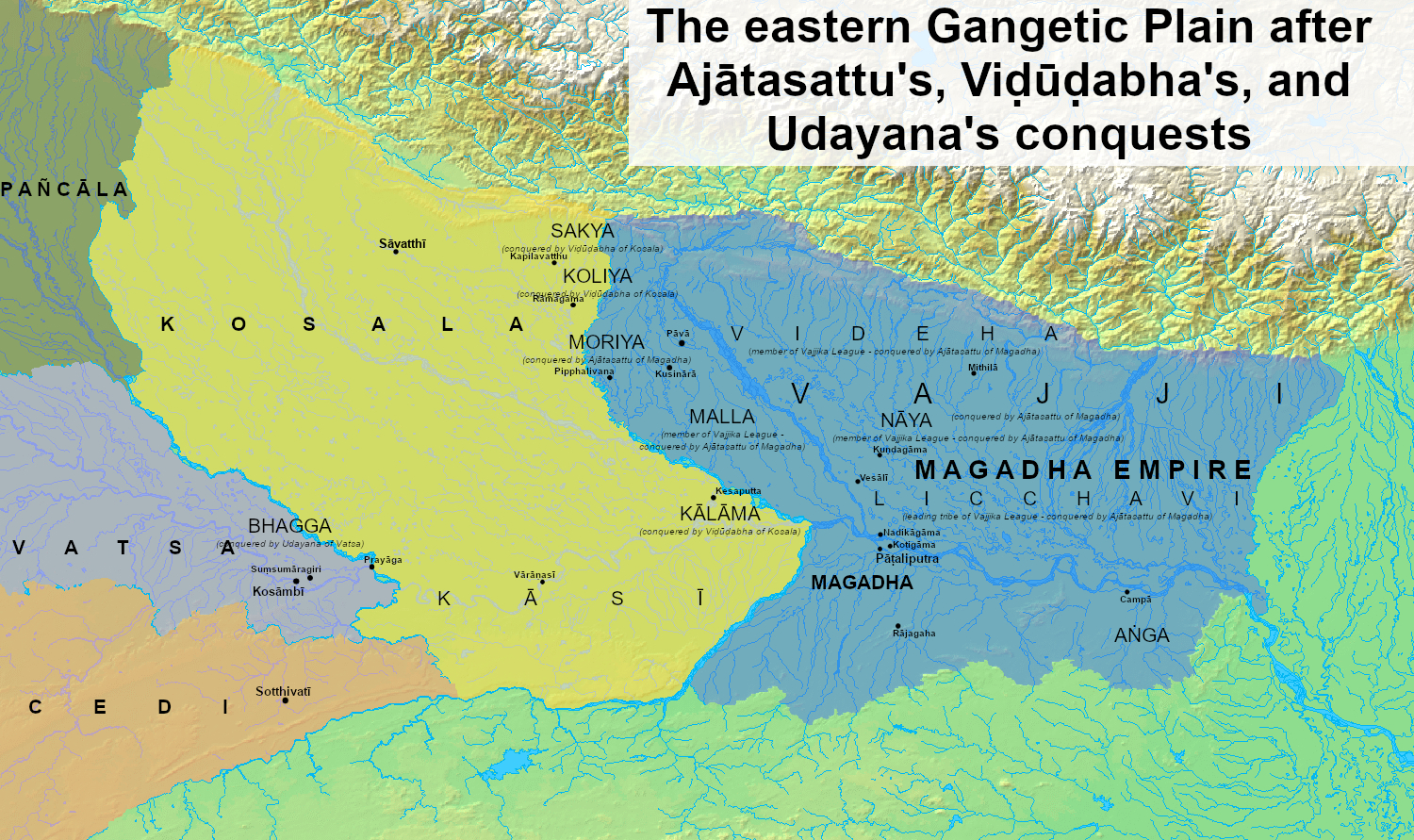
Map of the eastern Gangetic plain after Viḍūḍabha's conquest of Kālāma, Sakya and Koliya

Koliya (Pāli: Koliya) was an ancient Indo-Aryan clan of north-eastern South Asia whose existence is attested during the Iron Age. The Koliyas were organised into a gaṇasaṅgha (an aristocratic republic), presently referred to as the Koliya Republic.

== Location ==
The territory of the Koliyas was a thin strip of land spanning from the river Sarayū to the Himālayan hills in the north. The Rohiṇī river was the western border of the Koliyas, with their neighbours to the north-west being the Sakyas. In the south-west, the river Anomā or Rāptī separated the Koliyas from the kingdom of Kosala, to the east their neighbours were the Moriyas, and to their north-east they bordered on the Mallakas of Kusinārā.

The capital of the Koliyas was Devadaha, and one of their other settlements was Ramgram.

== Name ==
The name of the tribe is uniformly attested under the Pāli form Koliya. The Koliyas originally obtained this name from the kola (jujube) tree because they lived in a region where kola trees were abundant, and because the kola tree was their totem.

== History ==
The early history of the Koliyas is little-known, although it is certain that they were related to their western neighbours, the Sakyas, with whom they intermarried.

By the sixth century BCE, the Koliyas, the Sakyas, Moriyas, and Mallaka lived between the territories of the Kauśalyas to the west and the Licchavikas and Vaidehas to the east, thus separating the Vajjika League from the Kosala kingdom.

The princess Māyā, who was the daughter of a Koliya noble, was married to the Sakya rājā Suddhodana, who was one of the members of the ruling aristocratic oligarchy of the Sakyas. The son of Maya and Suddhodana was Siddhartha Gautama, the historical Buddha and the founder of Buddhism.

During the life of the Buddha, an armed feud opposed the Sakyas and the Koliyas concerning the waters of the river Rohiṇī, which formed the boundary between the two states and whose water was needed by both of them to irrigate their crops. The intervention of the Buddha finally put an end to these hostilities.

After the death of the Buddha, the Koliyas claimed from the Mallakas of Kusinārā a share of his relics, over which they built a stūpa at their capital of Rāmagāma.

=== Conquest by Kosala ===
Shortly after the Buddha's death, the Kauśalya king Viḍūḍabha, who had overthrown his father Pasenadi, invaded the Sakya and Koliya republics, seeking to conquer their territories because they had once been part of Kosala. Viḍūḍabha finally triumphed over the Sakyas and Koliyas and annexed their state after a long war with massive loss of lives on both sides. Details of this war were exaggerated by later Buddhist accounts, which claimed that Viḍūḍabha exterminated the Sakyas in retaliation for having given in marriage to his father the slave girl who became Viḍūḍabha's mother. In actuality, Viḍūḍabha's invasion of Sakya might instead have had similar motivations to the conquest of the Vajjika League by Viḍūḍabha's relative, the Māgadhī king Ajātasattu, who, because he was the son of a Vajjika princess, was therefore interested in the territory of his mother's homeland. The result of the Kauśalya invasion was that the Sakyas and Koliyas merely lost political importance after being annexed into Viḍūḍabha's kingdom. The Sakyas nevertheless soon disappeared as an ethnic group after their annexation, having become absorbed into the population of Kosala, with only a few displaced families maintaining the Sakya identity afterwards. The Koliyas likewise disappeared as a polity and as a tribe soon after their annexation.

The massive life losses incurred by Kosala during its conquest of Sakya and Koliya weakened it significantly enough that it was itself was soon annexed by its eastern neighbour, the kingdom of Magadha, and its king Viḍūḍabha was defeated and killed by the Māgadhī king Ajātasattu. Alternatively, the Koliyas might have been conquered by Ajātasattu directly after fighting against Magadha just like the Vajjika League did.

== Social and political organisation ==
The Koliyas were organised into a gaṇasaṅgha (an aristocratic oligarchic republic). Like the Sakyas, the Koliyas were a kṣatriya tribe, but unlike the Sakyas who belonged to the Gotama and Ādicca gottas, the Koliyas belonged to the Vyagghapajja gotta.

=== Republican institutions ===
==== The Assembly ====
The Koliyas' governing body was a general Assembly of the heads of the kṣatriya clans, who held the title of khattiya and of rājā ("ruler"). The Koliya Assembly was small and consisted of a few hundred members. The sons of the rājās, who possessed the title of Koliya-kumāras ("princes of Koliya"), were also their uparājās (Viceroys), and would hereditarily succeed their fathers upon their deaths.

The political system of the Koliyas was identical to that of the Sakyas, and, like the Sakyas and the other gaṇasaṅgha, the Koliya Assembly met in a santhāgāra, the main of which was located at Rāmagāma. The judicial and legislative functions of the Assembly of the Koliyas were not distinctly separated, and it met to discuss important issues concerning public affairs, such as war, peace, and alliances. The Koliya Assembly deliberated on important issues, and it had a simple voting system through either raising hands or the use of wooden chips.

==== Mahārājā (Great King) ====
The Koliya Assembly elected as the head of the state a head rājā who had the title of mahārājā ("great ruler") or Koliya-rājā ("Ruler of Koliya"). The mahārājā was in charge of administering the republic with the help of the council.

==== Council ====
The Koliya Assembly met rarely, and it instead had an inner Council which met more often and was in charge of helping the mahārājā administer the republic. The members of the Koliya Assembly held the title of amaccās ("councillors"). The amaccās formed a college which was directly in charge of public affairs of the republic.

=== Class society ===
The society of the Koliyas and Sakyas was a stratified one within which were present at least the aristocratic, land-owning, attendant, labourer, and serf classes.

==== Landholders ====
Similarly to the Sakyas, the Koliyas of Indo-Aryan origin who had participated in colonising the territory of the republic had the right to own land. These landholders were analogous to mediaeval European barons, and held the title of bhojakās, literally meaning "enjoyers (of the right to own land)," and used in the sense of "headmen."

==== Servants ====
The lower classes of Koliya society consisted of servants, in Pāli called kammakaras (meaning "labourers") and sevakas (meaning "serfs"), who performed the labour in the farms.

=== The police ===
The Koliya Assembly possessed a body of peons or police who wore a headdress with a drooping crest.

== Sources ==
- Sharma, J. P. (1968). Republics in Ancient India, C. 1500 B.C.-500 B.C. Leiden, Netherlands: E. J. Brill. ISBN 978-9-004-02015-3.
