= Greater Magadha =

Concept of Indian history

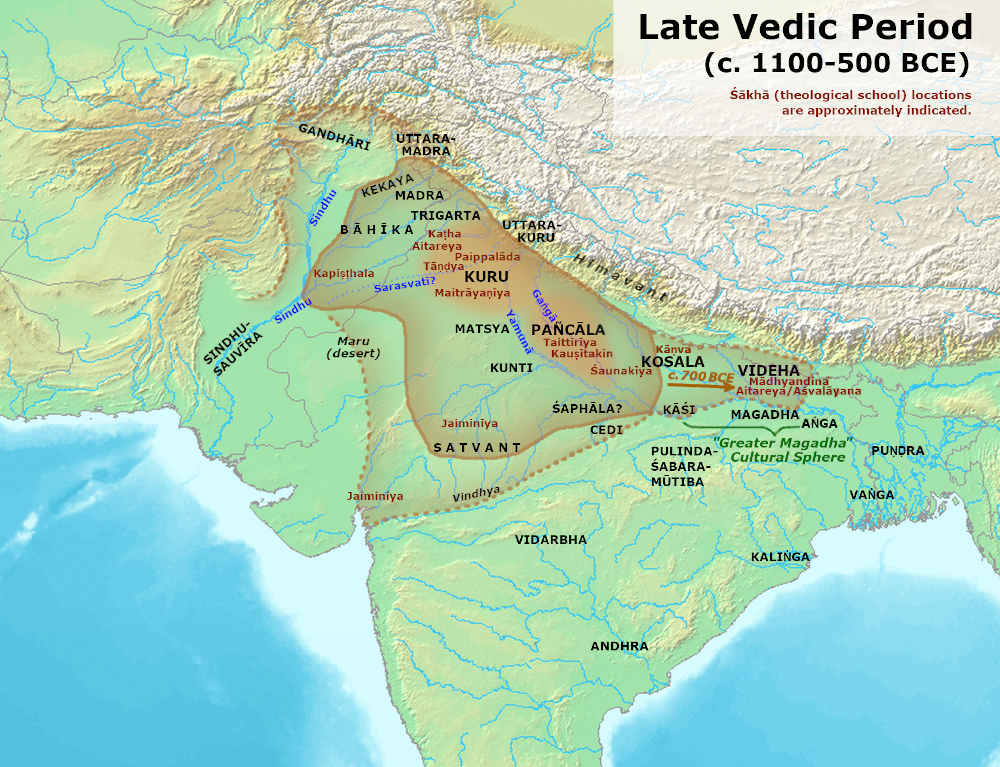
The spread of the Vedic culture in the late Vedic period. Aryavarta was limited to northwest India and the western Ganges plain, while Greater Magadha in the east was occupied by non-Vedic Indo-Aryans. The location of shakhas is labeled in maroon.

Greater Magadha is a theory in the studies of the ancient history of India, introduced by Johannes Bronkhorst. It refers to the Indo-Aryan non-Vedic political and cultural sphere that developed in the lower Gangetic plains (modern day Bihar, Eastern Uttar Pradesh and West Bengal), east of the Vedic heartland and roughly corresponding to the region of the later Magadha empire.

According to Bronkhorst, out of the ideological opposition between these two cultural spheres – the Vedic realms of Kuru and Panchala in the west, and Śramaṇa of Greater Magadha in the east – developed the two main religious and spiritual ideologies of Ancient India. Critics have questioned Bronkhorst's assertion of a stark cultural division between East and West, as well as his claim that early Magadha was less influenced by Brahmanization.

== Overview ==
The concept was developed in a book by the Indologist Johannes Bronkhorst. The concept of the cultural region of "Greater Magadha" extends well beyond the traditional political boundaries of the ancient mahājanapada of Magadha. Bronkhorst does not specify the exact limits or provide a map but refers to the "region east of the confluence of the Gaṅgā and the Yamunā" and "the geographical area in which the Buddha and Mahāvīra lived and taught" as Greater Magadha. Thus, Greater Magadha encompasses other ancient mahājanapadas in parts of modern Eastern Uttar Pradesh, Bihar, and West Bengal, outside the core area of Magadha.

They developed an ideological opposition to the sacrifice and ritual slaying of animals. Later this non-Vedic tradition gave rise to religions or schools of philosophy such as Jainism which later gave rise to concepts like ahimsa.

According to Bronkhorst, the Śramaṇa culture arose in "Greater Magadha", which was Indo-Aryan, but not Vedic. In this culture, Kshatriyas were placed higher than Brahmins, and it rejected Vedic authority and rituals.

Out of the ideological opposition between these two cultural spheres – the Vedic realms of Kuru and Panchala in the west, and Śramaṇa of Greater Magadha in the east – developed the two main religious & spiritual ideologies of Ancient India.

Vedic religion, which placed a lot of importance on the system of ritual correctness, arose out of the culture of the erstwhile Kuru and Panchala realms. While the Śramaṇa tradition, which placed emphasis on the spiritual works, that developed in Greater Magadha, later to gave rise to non-Vedic (non-Brahmanical) religions such as Buddhism, Jainism, Ajivika, Ajñana and the atheist ideology of Lokāyata (Charvaka).

== Criticism ==
According to Norelius, critics have questioned Johannes Bronkhorst's claim of a sharp cultural divide between east and west, the supposed lesser influence of Brahmanisation in early Magadha, or his proposed revision of textual chronology, while also criticizing him for overlooking the role of socioeconomic and political developments in shaping new ideological trends.

Alexander Wynne questions Bronkhorst's late dating of early Upanishads. He argues the ideas of karma, reincarnation and liberation developed within the Vedic tradition rather than being borrowed. He states that there is more continuity between late Vedic thought and early Upanishads than Bronkhorst allows. Wynne proposes an alternative view that unorthodox Brahmin thinkers in the eastern region developed these ideas, triggering the ascetic and philosophical culture Bronkhorst associates with Greater Magadha.

On the other hand, Geoffrey Samuel, following Thomas Hopkins, also proposed that the Central Gangetic region formed a "distinct but related cultural complex", as exemplified by the Painted Grey Ware, which did not spread past the Ganga-Yamuna Doab. It was the area of the earliest known rice cultivation in South Asia, and had reached the Chalcolithic when the Aryans first entered northwestern India. According to Hopkins, the Aryan societies and this eastern Gangetic culture formed two separate sources for the development toward iron-working and urbanisation. The Brahmins of the Aryan, Vedic cultural sphere perceived this eastern, non-Aryan, Jain-Buddhist cultural sphere as wholly different, with a religion of fertility and female deities which dominated this area.

== See also ==
- Magadha
- Vedic period
- Mahajanapadas
- History of India

== Sources ==
- Bronkhorst, Johannes (2007). Greater Magadha: Studies in the culture of early India. BRILL. ISBN 978-90-04-15719-4. OCLC 897004884.
- Samuel, Geoffrey (2010), The Origins of Yoga and Tantra. Indic Religions to the Thirteenth Century, Cambridge University Press
