= Johannes Bronkhorst =

Dutch Orientalist and Indologist (born 1946)

- Born: 17 July 1946; Schiedam, Netherlands
- Died: 14 May 2025 (aged 78)
- Occupations: Indologist; Orientalist; professor
- Known for: Greater Magadha

Academic background
- Education: Vrije Universiteit (B.Sc.); University of Rajasthan; University of Pune

Academic work
- Institutions: University of Lausanne
- Main interests: Early Buddhism

Johannes Bronkhorst (born 17 July 1946, in Schiedam, d. 14 May 2025) was a Dutch Orientalist and Indologist, specializing in Sanskrit grammar, Buddhist studies and early Buddhism. He was Professor of Sanskrit and Indian studies at the University of Lausanne from 1987–2011, and thereafter emeritus professor until his death in 2025.

== Life ==
Johannes studied Mathematics, Physics, and Astronomy at the Vrije Universiteit in Amsterdam (B.Sc. 1968). He then moved to India, to eventually study Sanskrit and Pāli, first to the University of Rajasthan in Jaipur. He completed his MA in 1976. He received his PhD from Pune University in 1979 specialising in Sanskrit grammar and Indian philosophy. Returning to the Netherlands, he did a second doctorate (1980) at the University of Leiden.

Having worked for research projects funded by the Nederlandse Organisatie voor Wetenschappelijk Onderzoek, he was appointed in 1987 to the position of Professor of Sanskrit and Indian studies at the University of Lausanne. He retired in 2011, being appointed Professor Emeritus.

Johannes and his wife Joy Manné Lewis died on 14 May 2025.

== Work ==
Bronkhorst has concentrated on the history of Indian thought and published on a wide range of topics, including indigenous grammar and linguistics, the interaction between Brahmanism, Buddhism, and Jainism and their philosophical schools and religious practices. A key output of this work appeared in his monograph Greater Magadha (2007). The book has been reviewed by several scholars including Jason Neelis and Alexander Wynne. Some of Bronkhort's publications address larger questions relating to the theory and study of religion. The website of the University of Lausanne provides access to some of his work.

Bronkhorst was amongst the most prolific scholarly authors of his time, publishing many articles, and often one or two books, every year. His many historical insights and challenges to received theories fundamentally changed the scholarly conversation regarding many aspects of Indian history and culture. Bronkhorst was strongly influenced by the thought of Karl Popper, particularly in regard to the importance of proposing strong hypotheses and accepting valid criticisms, and Popper's ideas about the centrality of falsifiability to the growth of knowledge.

Bronkhorst became a corresponding member of the Royal Netherlands Academy of Arts and Sciences in 1996.

== Select publications ==
- — (2009). Buddhist Teaching in India. Boston: Wisdom Publications. ISBN 9780861715664.
- — (2011). Buddhism in the Shadow of Brahmanism. Leiden: Brill. ISBN 9789004201408.
- — (2011). Language and Reality: On an Episode in Indian Thought. Leiden: Brill. ISBN 9789004204355.
- — (2012). "Rites Without Symbols". Method & Theory in the Study of Religion. 24 (3): 236–266. doi:10.1163/157006812X635691. S2CID 55938059.
- — (2016). How the Brahmins Won: From Alexander to the Guptas. Leiden; Boston: Brill. ISBN 978-90-04-31551-8.
- — (2024). Extreme Religious Behaviours: Where Religious Practice and Biological Evolution Clash. Berlin: De Gruyter. ISBN 9783111374215.
