= Rohni River =

Rohinī Nadī रोहिणी नदी

Location
- Country: Nepal, India

Physical characteristics
- Source
  - location: Kapilvastu District and Rupandehi District, south-central Nepal
  - elevation: 850 m (2,790 ft)
- Mouth
  - location: West Rapti River west of Gorakhpur at
  - coordinates: 26°45′22.8″N 83°19′54.3″E
  - elevation: 75 m (246 ft)
- Length: 122 km (76 mi)
- Basin size: 2,686 km^{2} (1,037 sq mi)

The Rohni (also known as Rohini or Rohin) is a river which rises in the Chure or Sivalik Hills in Kapilvastu and Rupandehi Districts of Nepal's Lumbini Zone and flows south into Uttar Pradesh state, India. At Gorakhpur it becomes a left bank tributary of West Rapti River, which in turn joins the Ghaghara above Gaura Barhaj, then Ghaghara in turn joins the Ganges.

According to an account in several Buddhist texts, Kapilavatthu (the town of the Sakyans) and Koli (the town of the Koliyans) were situated on either side of the Rohini river. The cultivators of both towns worked the fields watered by the Rohini river. One year, they did not have enough rain and finding that the paddy and other crops were beginning to shrivel up, cultivators on both sides wanted to divert the water from the Rohini river to their own fields. Those living in Koli said that there was not enough water in the river for both sides, and that if only they could channel the water just once more to their fields that would be enough for the paddy to mature and ripen. On the other hand, people from Kapilavatthu argued that, in that case, they would be denied the use of the water and their crops would surely fail, and they would be compelled to buy from other people. They said that they were not prepared to go carrying their money and valuables to the opposite bank of the river in exchange for food. Both sides wanted the water for their own use only and there was much ill will between them due to abusive language and accusations on both sides. The quarrel that started between the cultivators came to the ears of the ministers concerned, and they reported the matter to their respective rulers, and both sides prepared to go to war

Buddhist tradition holds that Siddhārtha Gautama crossed this river in his return to Kapilavastu.

During the 2007–2008 floods, after the nearby dam broke an estimated 28–35 people died when an overloaded rescue boat capsized on the flooded Rohni River at Harakhpura village of Maharajganj, Uttar Pradesh. There were an estimated 85–90 passengers aboard the boat, which was only rated for 30 occupants. Most were women and children.
