= Gaṇasaṅgha =

Political structure in South Asia

Gana-Sangha (Tribal Assembly) or Gana-Rajya (Tribal State) was a type of tribe and clan structure of aristocratic republics in ancient India.

== Etymology ==
The Mahajanapadas were the sixteen most powerful states in ancient India. Among the Mahajanapadas and other smaller states around them, some of the states followed a republican form of government

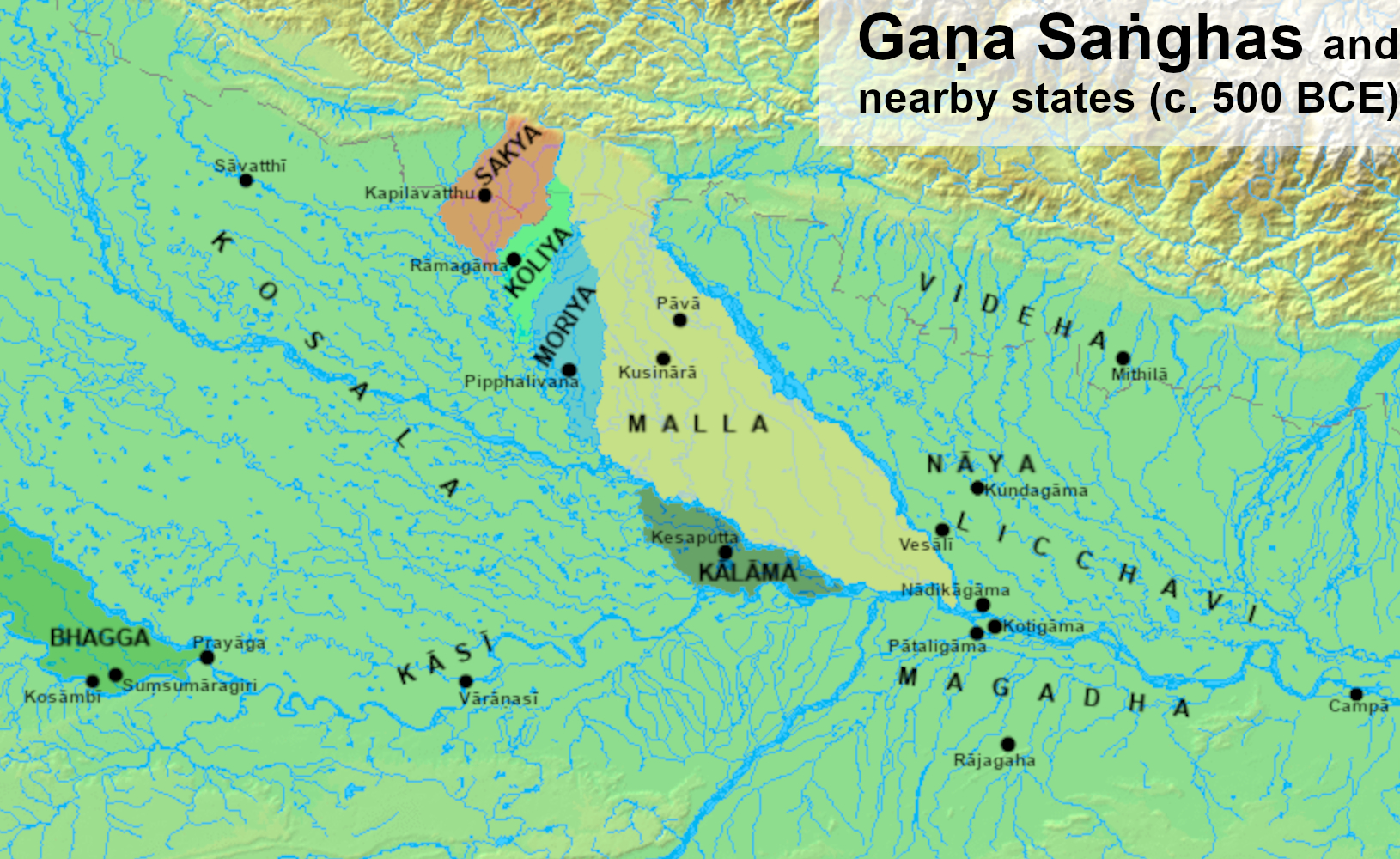
The Gaṇasaṅghas of ancient India.

The word gaṇa (/ˈɡʌnə/; Sanskrit: गण) in Sanskrit and Pali means group or community. It can also be used to refer to a body of attendants and can refer to any assemblage or association of men formed for the attainment of the same aims, denotes the gathering of a given community. The word sangha in Sanskrit means association, assembly, company or community. For instance, in Buddhism, sangha refers to the monastic community of bhikkhus (monks) and bhikkhunis (nuns).

The phrase gana sangha can be translated as (rule by) tribal assembly. In ancient Buddhist texts like the Anguttara Nikaya which make frequent reference to the great states in ancient India, the texts often use the phrase to refer a type of aristocratic rule, contrast to monarchy (साम्राज्य samarajya in Sanskrit).

Among the mahajanapadas, the sixteen great states in ancient India, two followed the gana sangha rule: Vajji and Mallakas. Many smaller states and tribes near these great states also had the gana sangha form of government, such as the Koliyas, and the Shakyas, the small tribal state which Gautama Buddha was born to.

The gana sanghas were generally located in the periphery of the major ancient Indian states, both geographically and culturally, and tend to occupy the higher ground near the Himalayas. The gana sanghas of Vajji, Malla, Koliya, and Shakya mentioned above all situated at the foothills of Himalayas, near eastern Uttar Pradesh, Bihar, Terai region of Nepal. In contrast, the states which followed a monarchical government (saamarajya) were generally located in the flood plains of the Ganges.

== Institution ==
According to the Buddhist sources, key characteristics of the gana sangha seem to include a gana mukhya (chief), and a deliberative assembly (sangha). Elected by the gana sangha, the chief apparently always belonged to a family of the noble class of Kshatriya Varna. The chief coordinated his activities with the assembly; in some states, he did so with a council of other nobles. The assembly met regularly, and would discuss all major state decisions. This body also had full financial, administrative, and judicial authority. Other officers, who rarely receive any mention, obeyed the decisions of the assembly.

The general make-up of the gana sanghas was either that of a single clan (e.g. Shakya), or a confederacy of clans (e.g. Vajji). Most of the gana sanghas are aristocratic in nature: For instance, the Licchavis, the ruling clan of Vajji, had a primary governing body of 7,077 rajas, the heads of the most important families. On the other hand, the smaller state of Shakyas and Koliyas, during the period around Gautama Buddha, had the assembly open to all men, rich and poor.

== Historical records ==
The gana sanghas in India it is generally believed existed as early as the 6th century BC, and persisted in some areas until the 4th century. The ancient Buddhist texts provide many accounts of the various ancient Indian states at the time of the Buddha, including their forms of governments and political workings. Among the larger mahajanapadas, Mallas, centered in the city of Kusinagara, and the Vajji (or Vṛji) confederation, centered in the city of Vaishali, existed as early as the 6th century BC, and both of their administrations were divided into executive, judicial, and military functions. Even in the other kingdoms of the mahajanapadas, their monarchical rule would also include republican communities such as the Community of Rajakumara, The villages at this era also had their own assemblies under their village heads called gramakas.

The Arthashastra, an ancient Indian handbook for monarchs on how to rule efficiently, sometimes referred to as "The Prince of Ancient India", also contains a chapter on how to deal with the sanghas (assemblies), which includes injunctions on manipulating the noble leaders. Yet the chapter does not mention how to influence the mass of the citizens, indicating that the gana sangha is more of an aristocratic or oligarchical body, rather than democracy in a modern or even Athenian sense.

Outside Indian sources, Diodorus, a Greek historian who wrote two centuries after the time of Alexander the Great's invasion of India (now Pakistan and northwest India) mentions that independent and democratic states existed in India.

Scholars differ over how best to describe the gana sangha governments, and the vague, sporadic quality of the evidence allows for wide disagreements. Some emphasize the central role of the assemblies and thus tout them as democracies; other scholars focus on the upper-class domination of the leadership and possible control of the assembly and see an oligarchy or an aristocracy.

The rulers always belonged to warrior class. This is mentioned in Hindu, Buddhist and Jain texts. The aristocrats were always from kshatriya (warrior) class. This leads many scholars to claim that the true nature of gana sanghas is not comparable to truly democratic institutions.

== See also ==
- Janapada
- Mahajanapada
- Magadha–Vajji war
- History of India
- Monarchy in ancient India
