= Vajjika League =

Republican confederacy in ancient India

Vajjika League Vṛji
- c. 6th century BCE–c. 468 BCE
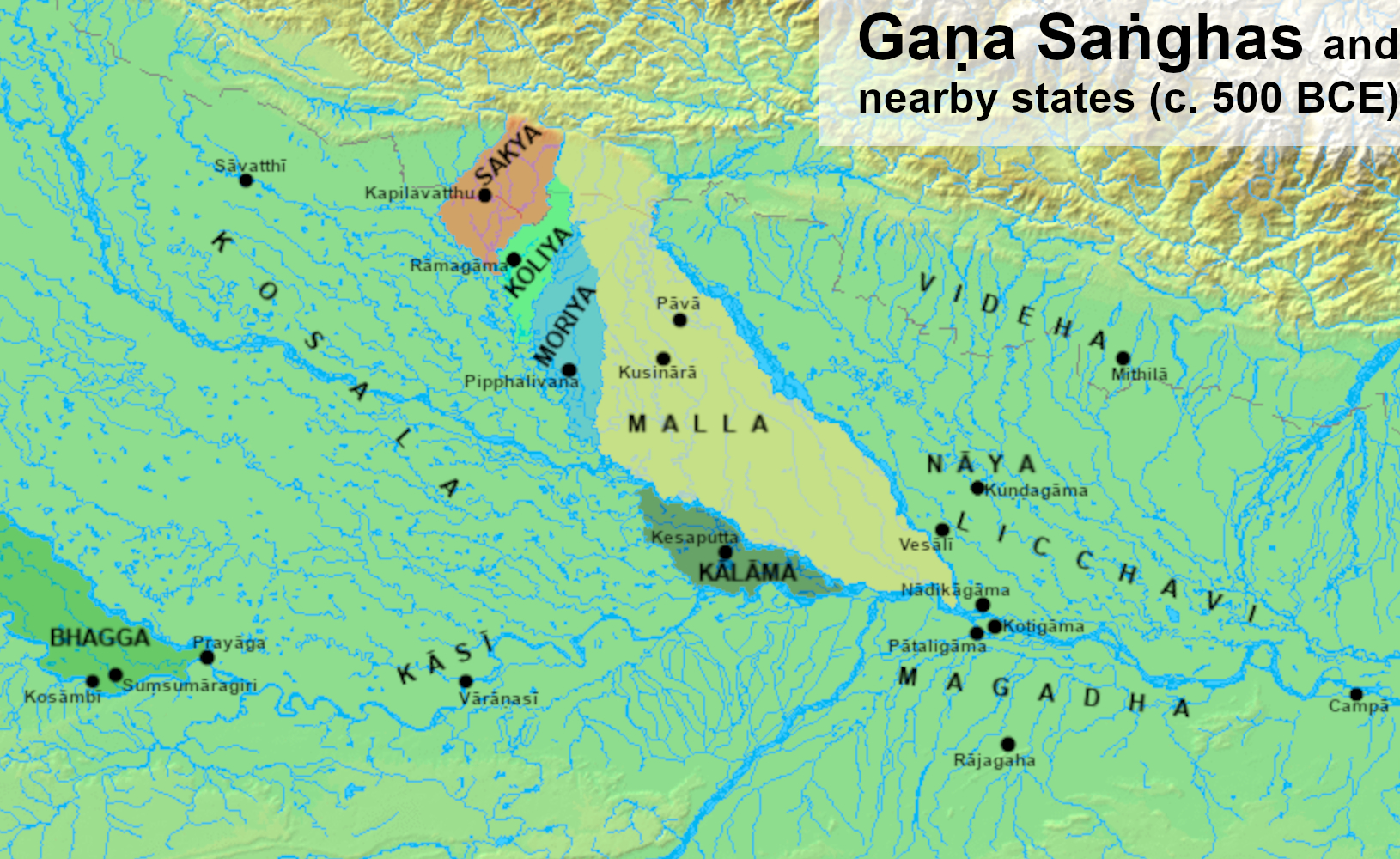
- The constituent tribes of the Vajjika League, Licchavi, Videha, and Nāya, among the Gaṇasaṅghas

- Vajji (the Licchavika dependencies within the Vajjika League), Malla, and other Mahajanapadas in the Post Vedic period
- Status: Confederation
- Capital: Vesālī
- Common languages: Prakrit; Sanskrit
- Religion: Vedic Hindusim; Jainism; Buddhism
- Demonym: Vajjika
- Government: Aristocratic Republic
- Gaṇa Mukhya
- Legislature: Sabhā
- Historical era: Iron Age
  - Established: c. 6th century BCE
  - Conquered by Ajātasattu of Magadha in 484–468 BCE: c. 468 BCE
Preceded by	Succeeded by
Videha	Magadha
- Today part of: India; Nepal

The Vajjika (Pāli: Vajjika) or Vrijika (IAST: Vṛjika) League, Confederacy, or Sangha, also called simply Vajji (Pāli: Vajji) or Vriji (IAST: Vṛji), was an ancient Indo-Aryan tribal league which existed during the later Iron Age period in north-east India.

== Name ==
The Vajjika League was named after one of its constituent tribes, the Vajjikas proper, who had once been the most powerful tribe in the region of the league's capital of Vesālī. The larger region of the former Mahā-Videha kingdom in which the Vajjika League was located was in turn named after the confederacy.

According to Chinese pilgrim Xuanzang, the name Saṃvajji, meaning "united Vajjis," was given by the peoples of northern South Asia to the Vajjika League.

== Constituent tribes ==
The Vajjika League was a league of republican tribal states under the leadership of the Licchavikas centred around the city of Vesālī. The other members of the league were the Vaidehas in the Mithila region, the Nāyikas of Kuṇḍapura, and the Vajji tribe proper, who were dependencies of the Licchavikas. The Mallakas, who were organised into two separate republics, were also part of the Vajjika League, although they were not dependencies of the Licchavikas and therefore maintained their independence and sovereign rights within the confederation, hence why Jain sources considered the Licchavikas and the neighbouring Mallakas of Kusinārā and Pāvā to be the republican states of Kāsī-Kosala.

The once popular view among scholars that the Vajjika League was constituted of eight clans was based on a misreading of the 5th century CE Buddhist commentator Buddhaghosa's mention that the legal tribunals of Vesālī included the aṭṭhakulika (अट्ठकुलिक), which was interpreted as meaning "eight tribes." The Pāli term kula (कुल) however means "clan" while the word for "tribe" is jana (जन), meaning that the term aṭṭhakulika instead referred to the heads of the eight leading ruling families of Vaisali and not to eight tribes.

=== Organisation ===
The Vajjika League was administered by the Vajjika Council, which consisted of eighteen members, of which nine were from the confederacy's leading Licchavika tribe while the other nine members were from the Videha, Nāya, Vajji, and Malla tribes.

Since the Licchavikas were the leading tribe of the confederacy, their capital city of Vesālī was the headquarter of the Vajjika League, and their army also functioned as the Vajjika army, although the other confederated tribes were also required to furnish troops to the league.

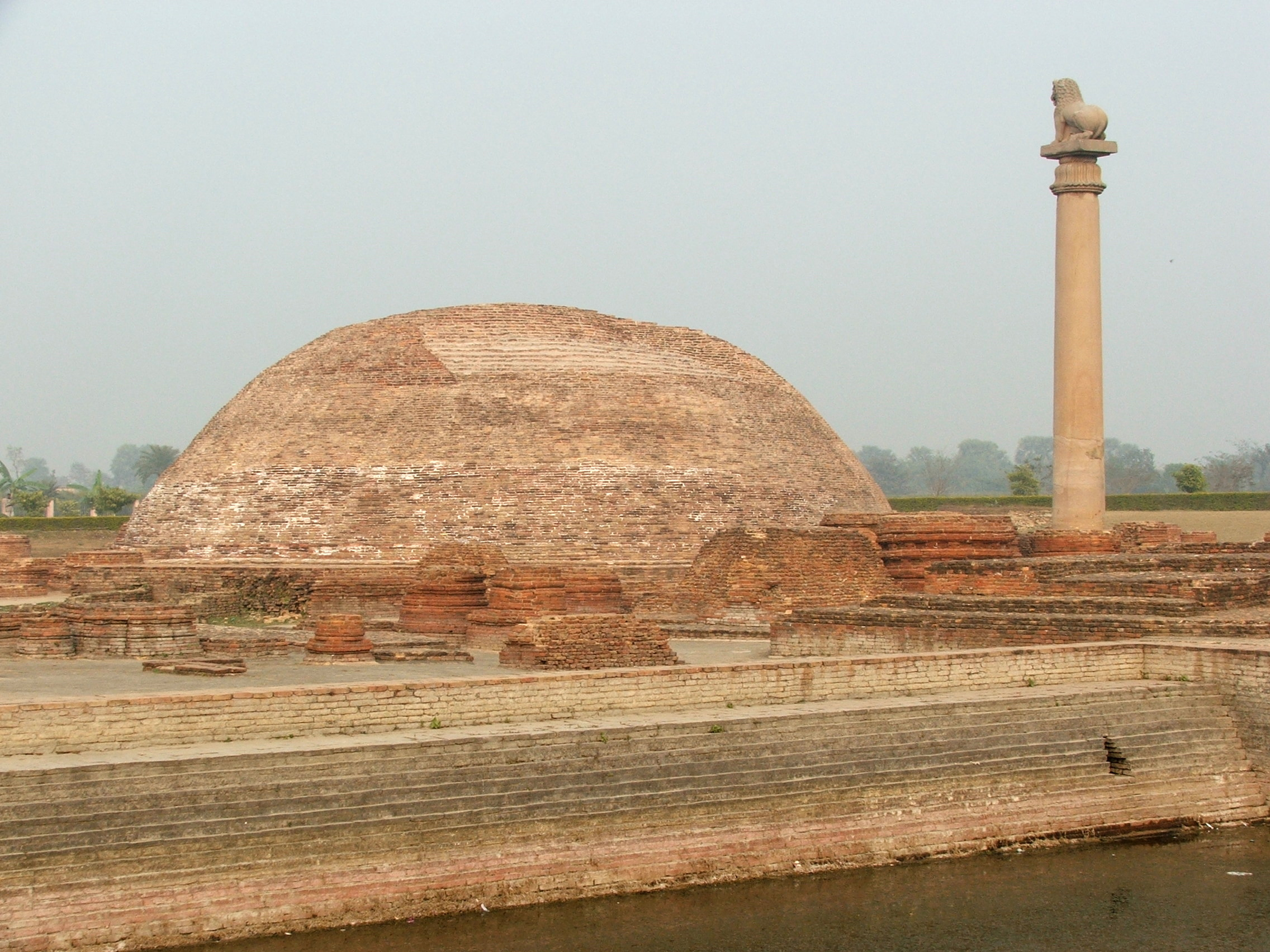
Ananda Stupa, with an Asokan pillar, at Vesālī, the capital city of Vajji and Licchavi.

== Location ==
The area of the Vajjika League was bounded to the north, east, south, and west, respectively, by the Himālaya mountains, and the Mahānanda, Gaṅgā, and Sadānirā rivers.

Within the Vajjika League, the Licchavikas lived in the southwest region, immediately to the north of the Gaṅgā river and to the east of the Sadānirā river.

The Vaidehas lived along the foothills of the Himālaya mountains between the Sadānirā and Kauśikī rivers, in what are now the Tarāī region and the south-eastern parts of Nepal including the lower hill ranges, as well as the northern part of what in present time is the Indian state of Bihār.

The Nāyikas were located in a small area around their capital, which was a minor town called either Kuṇḍagāma or Kuṇḍapura, located somewhere close to the Licchavika and Vajjika capital of Vesālī to its northeast. Other Nāya settlements included a northeastern suburb of Vesālī named Kollāga, as well as a cetiya named Dūīpalāsa that was nominally part of the Nāyikas' settlement at Kollāga but physically outside of it.

== History ==
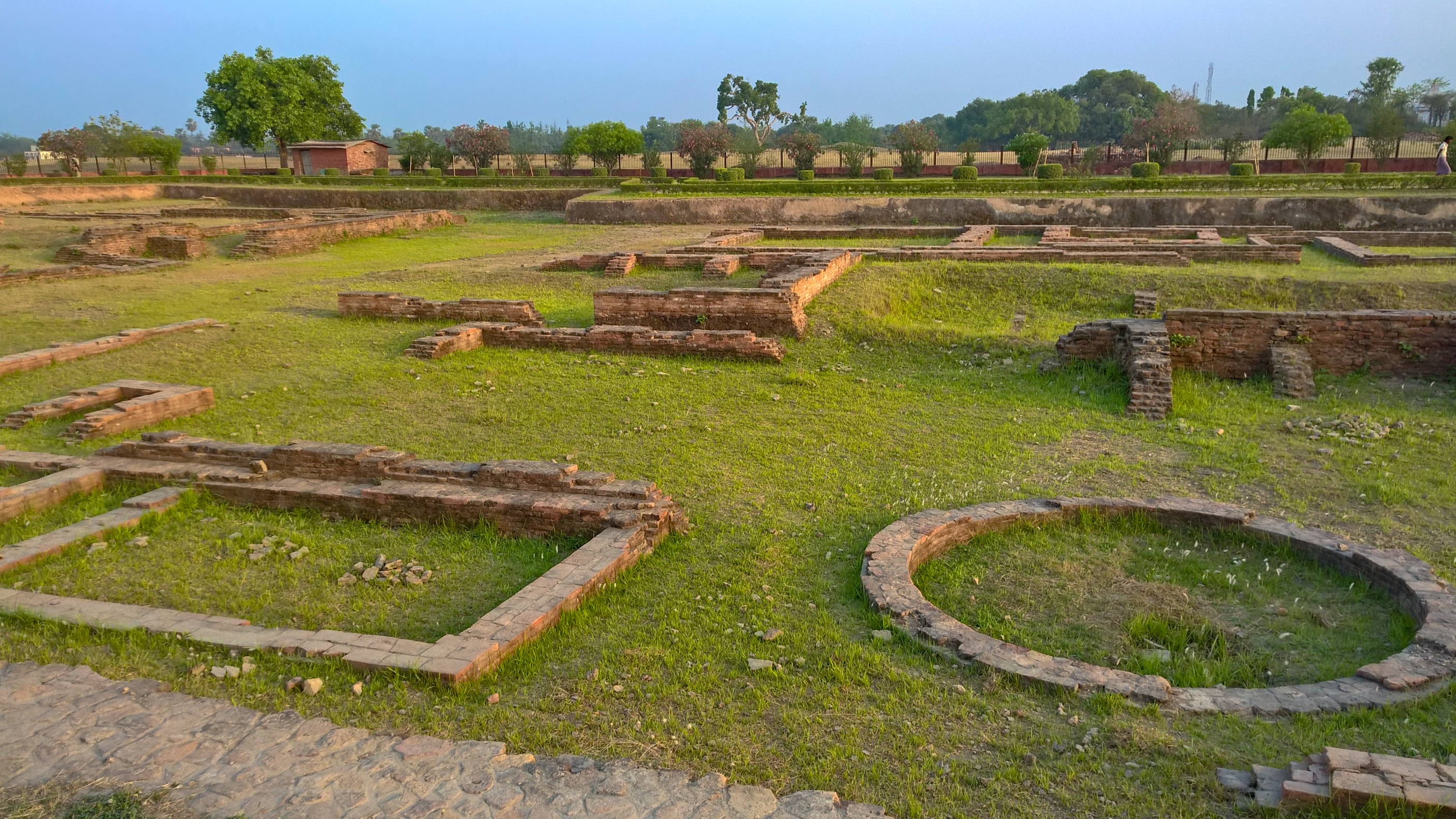
Excavated ruins in Vaishali known by locals as "Raja Vishal ka Garh" (Fort of Raja Vishala) and said to date to the time of the Vajjika league

The Vajjika League was located on the territory of the former Mahā-Videha kingdom founded by the tribe of the Vaidehas, an Indo-Aryan tribe in the eastern Gangetic plain in the Greater Magadha cultural region. Around 800 BCE the Mahā-Videha ("greater Videha") kingdom was established between the Sadānirā river in the west, the Kauśikī river in the east, the Ganges river in the south, and the Himālaya mountains in the north.

Shortly before or during the lifetime of the Buddha, around the 7th or 6th century BCE, the Mahā-Videha kingdom was invaded by the Licchavikas, an Indo-Aryan tribe who temporarily occupied the Vaideha capital of Mithilā, from where they could best administer the territory of Videha. The consequence of the occupation of Videha by the republican Licchavikas was that the Licchavikas relatively peacefully overthrew the already weakened Vaideha monarchical system and replaced it by a republican system.

Facing the rising power of Magadha to the south of the Ganges, the Licchavikas established their republic in the southern part of the former Videha kingdom and moved their political centre to the until then marginal location of Vesālī, which the Licchavikas turned into their largest city as well as their capital and stronghold. Meanwhile, the new Videha republic existed in a limited territory centred around Mithilā and located to the north of Licchavi. Many members of the Vaideha aristocracy who had submitted to the Licchavikas joined them in moving to Vesālī, and therefore became members of the Licchavika ruling aristocratic Assembly.

Once settled around Vesālī, the Licchavikas formed a state organised as a gaṇasaṅgha (an aristocratic republic). The Licchavikas themselves henceforth became the leading power within the territory of the former Mahā-Videha kingdom, with the Licchavika Assembly holding the sovereign and supreme rights over this territory. The Licchavikas founded the Vajjika League as a temporary league led by themselves, and named after the Vajji tribe proper, who had been the most powerful tribe in the region of Vesālī and were one of the constituent tribes of the league, within which they held their own sovereign rights.

The Videha republic was ruled by an Assembly of the kṣatriyas residing in and around Mithilā, and governing in the name of the Licchavika Assembly: the Videha republic was thus under significant influence of the Licchavi republic, and it joined the Vajjika League, within which it had limited autonomy concerning their domestic administration under the supervision of Licchavi, who fully controlled Vaideha foreign policy. The Nāyikas, who were a sub-group of the Vaidehas who formed an independent tribe, were another constituent republic of the Licchavi-led Vajjika League, and hence they held autonomy in matters of internal policy while their war and foreign policies were handled by the Vajjika League. The Licchavikas and the Mallakas were considered to be the republican states of Kāsī-Kosala by Jain sources, and both Mallaka republics joined the Licchavi-led Vajjika League to deal with danger they might have faced in common during periods of instability, and within which they held friendly relations with the Licchavikas, the Vaidehas, and the Nāyikas who were the other members of this league, although occasional quarrels did break out between these republics. Unlike the other confederate tribes such as the Vaidehas and Nāyikas, who had no sovereign rights of their own because they were dependencies of Licchavi, the Mallakas maintained their own sovereign rights within the Vajjika League.

During the 6th century BCE, the Gaṇa Mukhya ("head of the republic") of the Licchavikas, that is the head of state of the Licchavikas and of their Council, was Ceṭaka or Ceḍaga, which also made him the head of the Council of the Vajjika League. Ceḍaga's sister Trisalā was married to the Nāyika Gaṇa Mukhya Siddhārtha, with this marriage having been contracted because of Siddhārtha's political importance due to the important geographical location close to Vesālī of the Nāya tribe he headed, as well as due to Siddhārtha's membership in the Vajjika Council. The son of Siddhārtha and Trisalā, that is Ceḍaga's nephew, was Mahāvīra, the 24th Jain Tīrthaṅkara. Ceṭaka became an adept of the teachings of his nephew Mahāvīra and adopted Jainism, thus making the Licchavika and Vajjika capital of Vesālī a bastion of Jainism, and his sixth daughter, Sujyeṣṭhā, became a Jain nun, while the diplomatic marriages of his other daughters to various leaders, in turn, contributed to the spreading of Jainism across northern South Asia: Prabhāvatī was married to the king Udāyana of Sindhu-Sauvīra; Padmāvatī was married to king Dadhivāhana of Aṅga; Mṛgāvatī was married to the king Śatānīka of Vatsa, with their son being the famous Udayana; Śivā was married to king Pradyota of Avanti; Jyeṣṭhā was married to Ceṭaka's nephew, Nandivardhana of Kuṇḍagāma, who was the son of Trisalā and the elder brother of Mahāvīra; Cellaṇā was married to the king Bimbisāra of Magadha.

After the death of the Buddha, the Licchavikas, the Mallakas, and the Sakyas claimed shares of his relics while the Vaidehas and the Nāyikas did not appear among the list of states claiming a share because they were dependencies of the Licchavikas without their own sovereignty, and therefore could not put forth their own claim while Licchavi could.

=== Conquest by Magadha ===
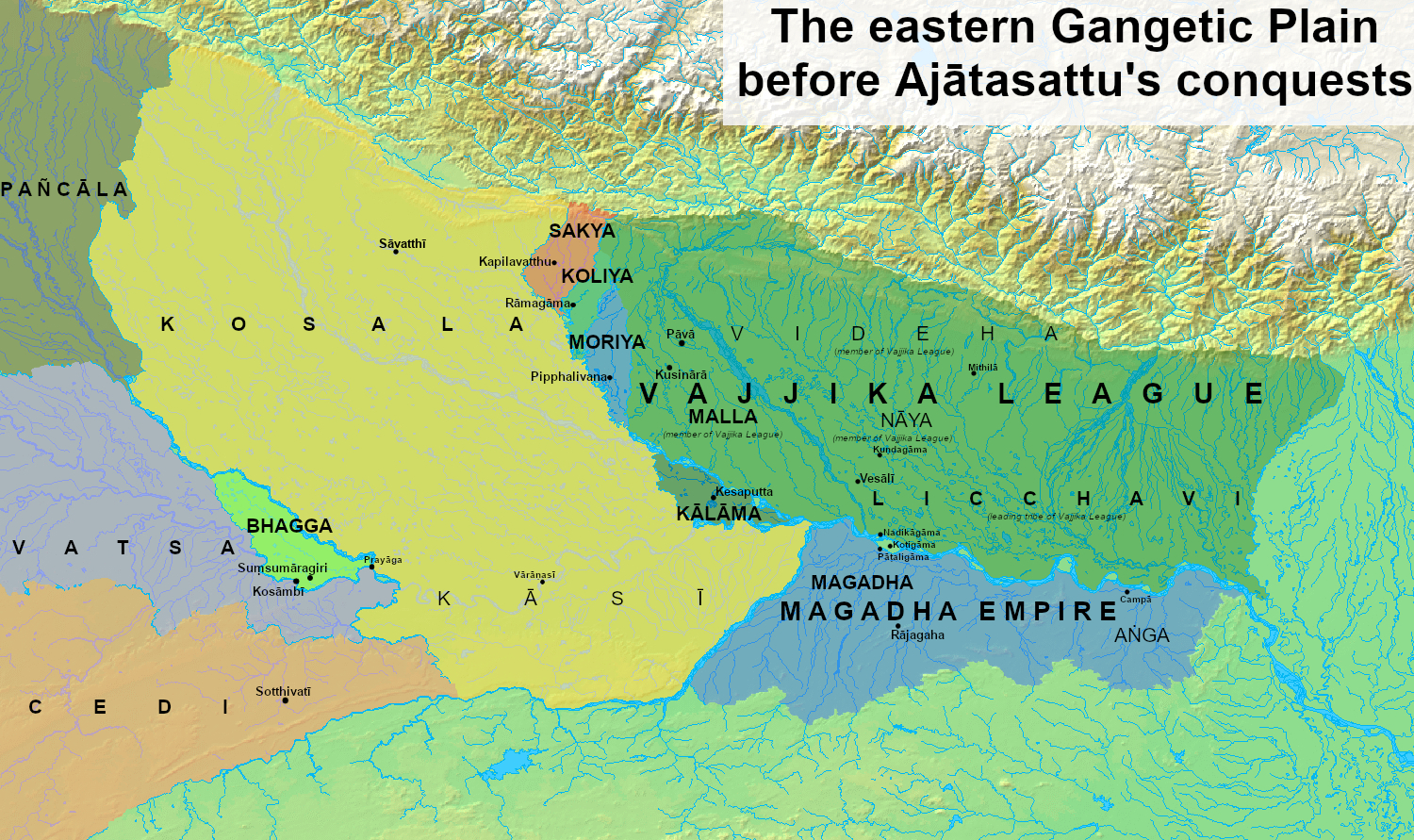
Map of the eastern Gangetic plain before Ajātasattu's conquests
(Malla shown within the Vajjika League)

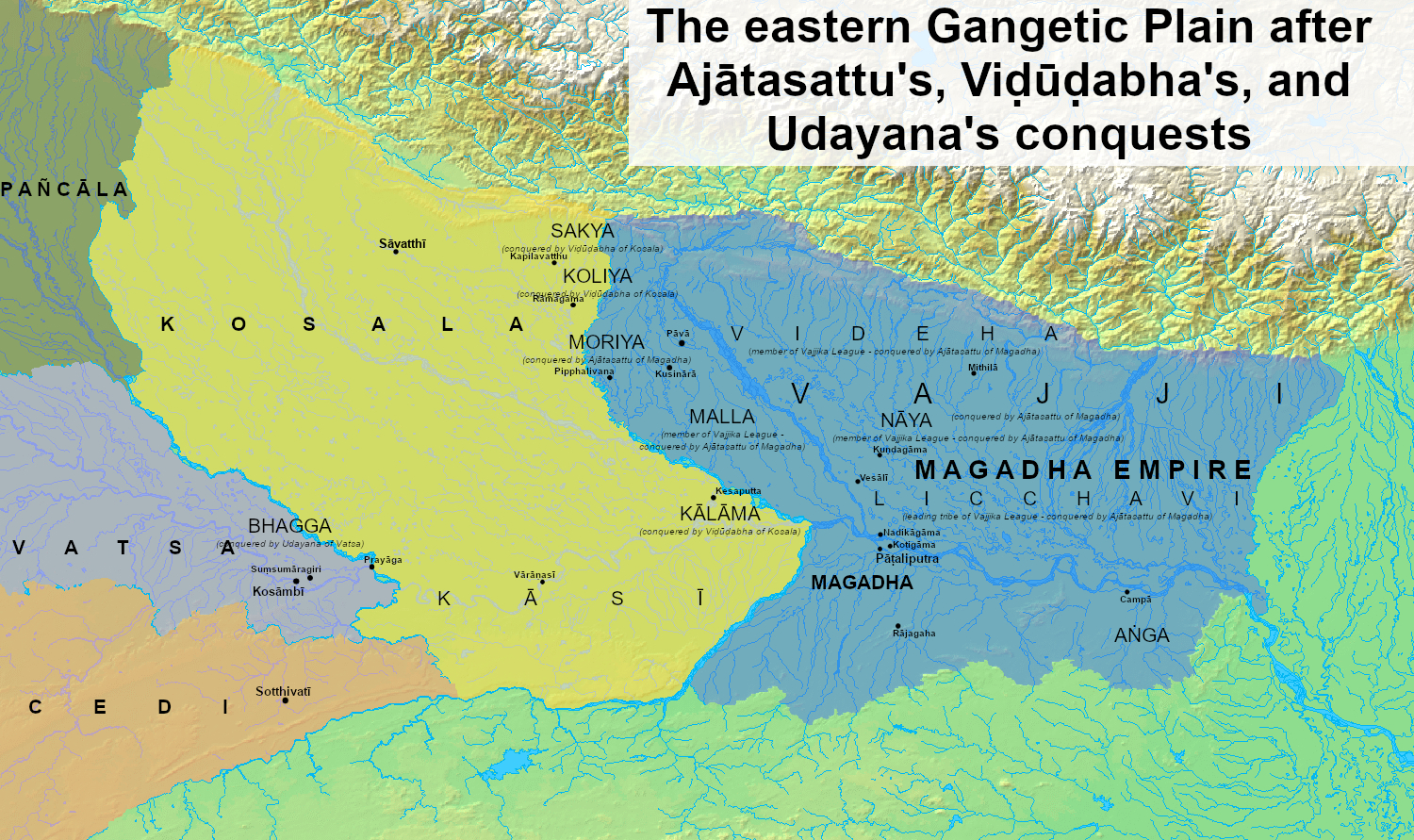
Map of the eastern Gangetic plain after Ajātasattu's conquest of the Vajjika League and of Moriya

The relations of the Licchavikas who led the Vajjika League with their southern neighbour, the kingdom of Magadha, were initially good, and the wife of the Māgadhī king Bimbisāra was the Vesālia princess Vāsavī, who was the daughter of the Licchavika Nāyaka Sakala's son Siṃha. There were nevertheless occasional tensions between Licchavi and Magadha, such as the competition at the Mallaka capital of Kusinārā over acquiring the relics of the Buddha after his death.

In another case, the Licchavikas once invaded Māgadhī territory from across the Gaṅgā, and at some point the relations between Magadha and Licchavi permanently deteriorated as result of a grave offence committed by the Licchavikas towards the Māgadhī king Bimbisāra.

The hostilities between Licchavi and Magadha continued under the rule of Ajātasattu, who was Bimbisāra's son with another Licchavika princess, Vāsavī, after he had killed Bimbisāra and usurped the throne of Magadha. Eventually Licchavi supported a revolt against Ajātasattu by his younger step-brother and the governor of Aṅga, Vehalla, who was the son of Bimbisāra by another Licchavika wife of his, Cellanā, a daughter of Ceḍaga, who was the head of both the Licchavi republic and the Vajjika League; Bimbisāra had chosen Vehalla as his successor following Ajātasattu's falling out of his favour after the latter had been caught conspiring against him, and the Licchavikas had attempted to place Vehalla on the throne of Magadha after Ajātasattu's usurpation and had allowed Vehalla to use their capital Vesālī as base for his revolt. After the failure of this rebellion, Vehalla sought refuge at his grandfather's place in the Licchavika and Vajjika capital of Vesālī, following which Ajātasattu repeatedly attempted to negotiate with the Licchavikas-Vajjikas. After Ajātasattu's repeated negotiation attempts ended in failure, he declared war on the Vajjika League in 484 BCE.

Tensions between Licchavi and Magadha were exacerbated by the handling of the joint Māgadhī-Licchavika border post of Koṭigāma on the Gaṅgā by the Licchavika-led Vajjika League who would regularly collect all valuables from Koṭigāma and leave none to the Māgadhīs. Therefore, Ajātasattu decided to destroy the Vajjika League in retaliation, but also because, as an ambitious empire-builder whose mother Vāsavī was Licchavika princess of Vaidehī descent, he was interested in the territory of the former Mahā-Videha kingdom which by then was part of the Vajjika League. Ajātasattu's hostility towards the Vajjika League was also the result of the differing forms of political organisation between Magadha and the Vajjika League, with the former being monarchical and the latter being republican, not unlike the opposition of the ancient Greek kingdom of Sparta to the democratic form of government in Athens, and the hostilities between the ancient Macedonian king Philip II to the Athenian and Theban republics.

As members of the Vajjika League, the Vaidehas, Nāyikas, and Mallakas were also threatened by Ajātasattu, and the Vajjika Gaṇa Mukhya Ceḍaga held war consultations with the rājās of the Licchavikas and Mallikas before the fight started. The Vaidehas, Nāyikas, and Mallakas therefore fought on the side of the League against Magadha. The military forces of the Vajjika League were initially too strong for Ajātasattu to be successful against them, and it required him having recourse to diplomacy and intrigues over the span of a decade to finally defeat the Vajjika League by 468 BCE and annex its territories, including Licchavi, Videha, and Nāya to the kingdom of Magadha, while the Mallakas also became part of Ajātasattu's Māgadhī empire but were allowed a limited degree of autonomy in terms of their internal administration, and stopped existing as a republican tribe when the Maurya dynasty ruled Magadha or shortly after. The Licchavikas nevertheless survived their defeat by Ajātasattu, and the structures of the older Licchavi republic subsisted within a degree local autonomy under Māgadhī rule, as attested by how the Licchavika Council instituted a festival in the memory of the decease of the Jain Tīrthaṅkara Mahāvīra.

== See also ==
- Mahajanapada
- History of India
- History of Hinduism
- List of Indian monarchs
- History of Mithila Region
