= Vajji (tribe) =

Republican tribe in Iron Age India

Vṛji Republic Vajji Republic
- c. 7th-6th century BCE–c. 468 BCE
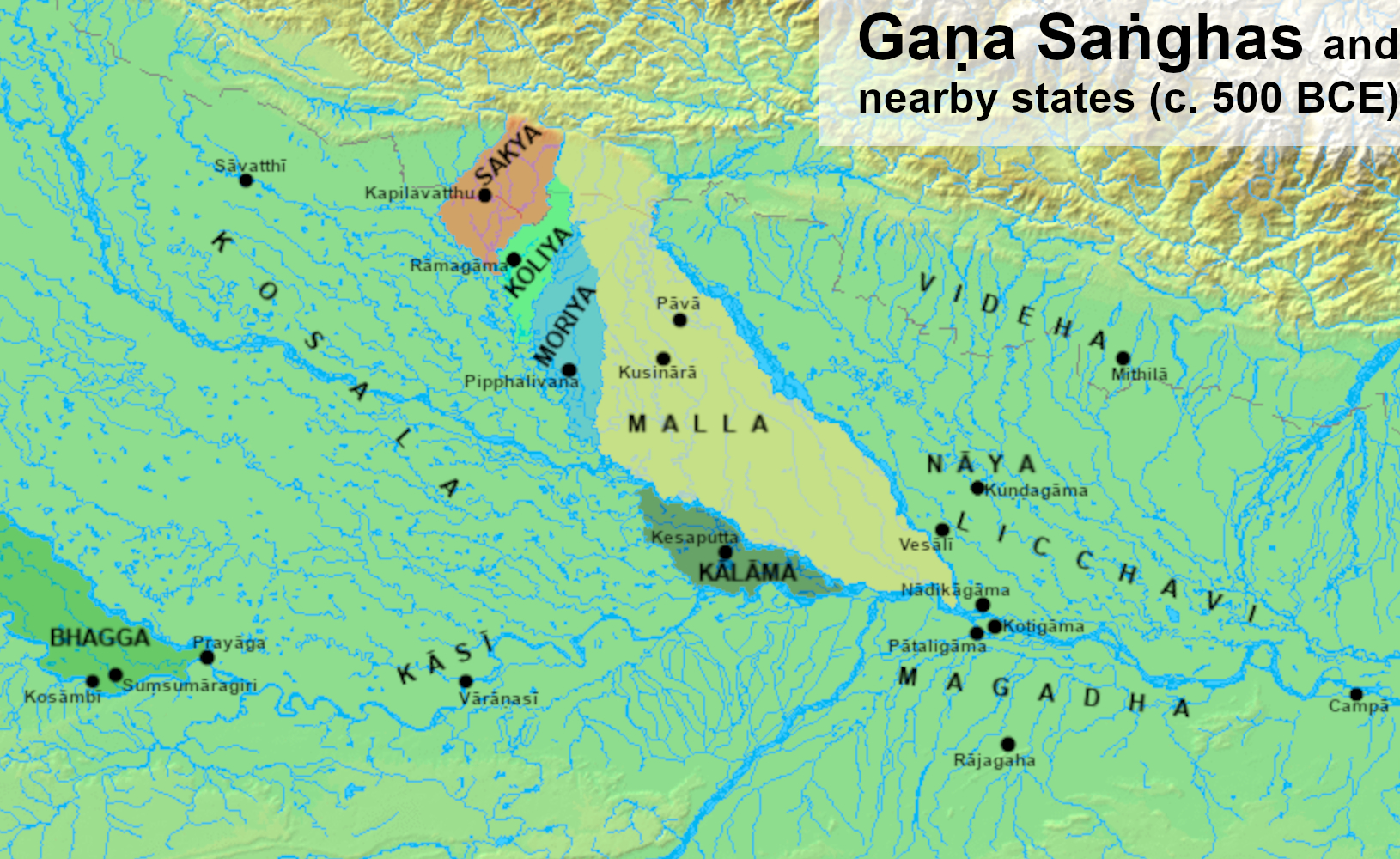
- The Gaṇasaṅghas in the 5th century BCE. Vajji was located near Vesālī

- Vajji (the Vajjika League), of which the Vajji tribe proper was a constituent, and other Mahajanapadas in the Post Vedic period.
- Status: Republic of the Vajjika League
- Common languages: Prakrit
- Religion: Historical Vedic religion Buddhism; Jainism
- Demonym: Vajjika
- Government: Aristocratic republic
- Gaṇa Mukhya
- Legislature: Sabhā
- Historical era: Iron Age
  - Established: c. 7th-6th century BCE
  - Conquered by Ajātasattu of Magadha in 484–468 BCE: c. 468 BCE
Preceded by	Succeeded by
Mahā-Videha	Magadha
- Today part of: India

Vajji (Pāli: Vajji) or Vriji (Sanskrit: Vṛji) was an ancient Aryan tribe of north-eastern South Asia whose existence is attested during the Iron Age. The population of Vajji, the Vajjikas, were organised into a gaṇasaṅgha (an aristocratic oligarchic republic), presently referred to as the Vajji Republic, which was part of the larger Vajjika League.

== Location ==
The Vajjikas lived in the territory around Vesālī.

== History ==
The Vajjikas used to be the most powerful tribe in the region around Vesālī, where their territory was located.

=== Later history ===
The Vajjika League was located on the territory of the former Mahā-Videha kingdom. Shortly before or during the lifetime of the Buddha, around the 7th or 6th century BCE, In the 7th or 6th century BCE, the Licchavikas invaded Mahā-Videha, replaced their monarchy by a republican system, and settled down in the southern part of former Mahā-Videha, where they founded their own republican state.

After setting up their state, the Licchavikas founded the Vajjika League led by themselves, and which was named after the Vajji tribe proper due to them having been the most powerful tribe of the region, and the whole territory of former Mahā-Videha was in turn named after the league. The remaining Vaidehas who were living in the north of former Mahā-Videha's territory, and another Vaideha sub-group named the Nāyikas who constituted an independent tribe, and the Mallakas joined this confederacy, although the Vaidehas, Nāyikas, and Vajjis did not have sovereign rights as they were dependencies of the Licchavikas, while the independent Mallakas maintained their sovereignty.

=== Conquest by Magadha ===
Relations between the Vajjika League of which the Vajji tribe proper was a member and Magadha had become progressively more tense during the reign of the Māgadhī king Bimbisāra's son with the Licchavika-Vaideha princess Vāsavī, after he succeeded his father. The outbreak of the war was caused by Licchavi's support for revolt against Ajātasattu by his younger brother and the governor of Aṅga, Vehalla, whom Bimbisāra had chosen as his successor following Ajātasattu's falling out of his favour after having been caught conspiring against him. Tensions between Licchavi and Magadha were exacerbated by the handling of the joint Māgadhī-Licchavika border post of Koṭigāma on the Gangā by the Licchavika-led Vajjika League who would regularly collect all valuables from Koṭigāma and leave none to the Māgadhīs. Therefore, Ajātasattu decided to destroy the Vajjika League in retaliation, but also because, as an ambitious empire-builder whose mother Vāsavī was Licchavika princess of Vaidehī descent, he was interested in the territory of the former Mahā-Videha kingdom which by then was part of the Vajjika League. Ajātasattu's hostility towards the Vajjika League was also the result of the differing forms of political organisation between Magadha and the Vajjika League, with the former being monarchical and the latter being republican, not unlike the opposition of the ancient Greek kingdom of Sparta to the democratic form of government in Athens, and the hostilities between the ancient Macedonian king Philip II to the Athenian and Theban republics.

As a member of the greater Vajjika League, the Vajji republic proper was also threatened by Ajātasattu, and it therefore fought on the side of the other confederate tribes of the league against Magadha. Ajātasattu finally defeated the Vajjika League by 468 BCE and annexed its territories, including the Vajji tribe proper, to the kingdom of Magadha. The Vajji republic ceased to be mentioned as an existing polity after the Māgadhī annexation of the Vajjika League, although the territory of the League itself would later be referred to as the "Vṛji janapada."

== Political and social organisation ==
The Vajjis were organised into a gaṇasaṅgha (an aristocratic oligarchic republic).

The Vajji tribe's state was part of the larger Vajjika League, with the league having been named after the tribe. Unlike the other tribes within the Vajjika League, the Vajji tribe proper maintained its sovereign rights.

== Sources ==
- Sharma, J. P. (1968). Republics in Ancient India, C. 1500 B.C.-500 B.C. Leiden, Netherlands: E. J. Brill. ISBN 978-9-004-02015-3.
