= Licchavis of Vaishali =

Ancient Indo-Aryan tribe

Licchavi Republic Licchavis of Vaishali
- c. 7th century BCE–c. 468 BCE
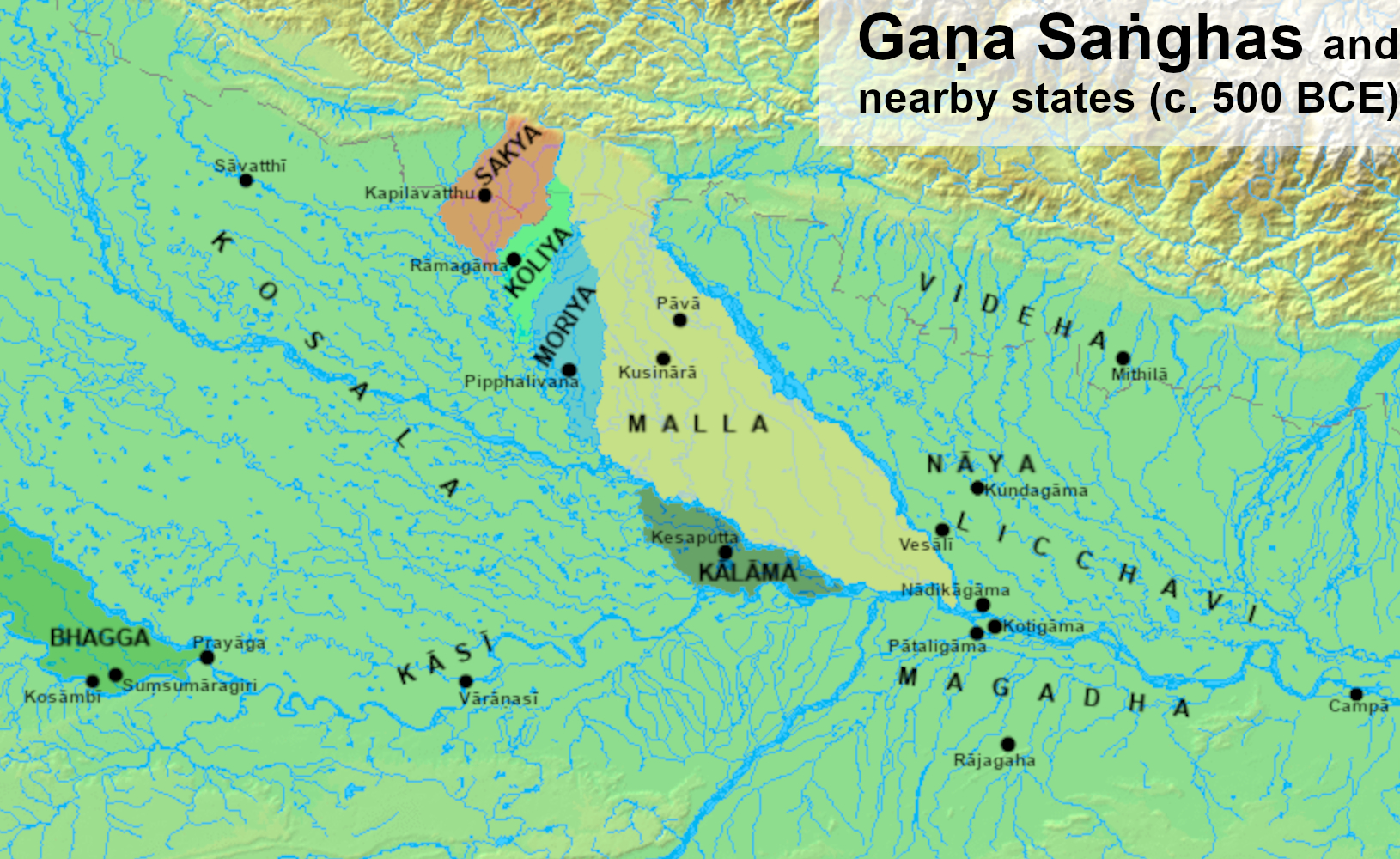
- Licchavi among the Gaṇasaṅghas

- Vajji (the Vajjika League), of which Licchavi was a constituent, and other Mahajanapadas in the Post Vedic period
- Status: Republic of the Vajjika League
- Capital: Vesālī
- Common languages: Prākrit
- Religion: Historical Vedic religion Buddhism; Jainism
- Demonym: Licchavika
- Government: Aristocratic Republic
- Gaṇa Mukhya
- Legislature: Sabhā
- Historical era: Iron Age
  - Established: c. 7th century BCE
  - Conquered by Ajātasattu of Magadha in 484–468 BCE: c. 468 BCE
Preceded by	Succeeded by
Mahā-Videha	Magadha
- Today part of: India

The Licchavis of Vaishali (Māgadhī Prakrit: 𑀮𑀺𑀘𑁆𑀙𑀯𑀺 Licchavi; Pāli: Licchavi; Sanskrit: ऋक्षवी Ṛkṣavī; English: "Bear Clan") were an ancient Indo-Aryan tribe and dynasty of eastern India whose existence is attested from the Iron Age to the Classical Age. The population of Licchavi, the Licchavikas, were organised into a gaṇasaṅgha (an aristocratic oligarchic republic), presently referred to as the Licchavi Republic, which was the leading state of the larger Vajjika League.

Following their eventual subjugation in the Magadha-Vajji war, the Licchavis continued to reside in the region of Vaishali. The fourth century A.D. Gupta Emperor, Samudragupta was the son of a Licchavi princess and referred to himself as a Licchavi-Dauhitra.

== Location ==
The Licchavikas lived in the southwest part of the Vajjika League, which was itself bounded to the north, east, south, and west, respectively, by the Himālaya mountains, and the Mahānadī, Gaṅgā, and Sadānirā rivers. The Sadānirā river was the Licchavikas' western border, and the Gaṅgā river as their border with the kingdom of Magadha in the south. The capital of the Licchavikas was located at Vesālī (Vaishali), which also acted as the headquarters of the Vajjika League led by Licchavi.

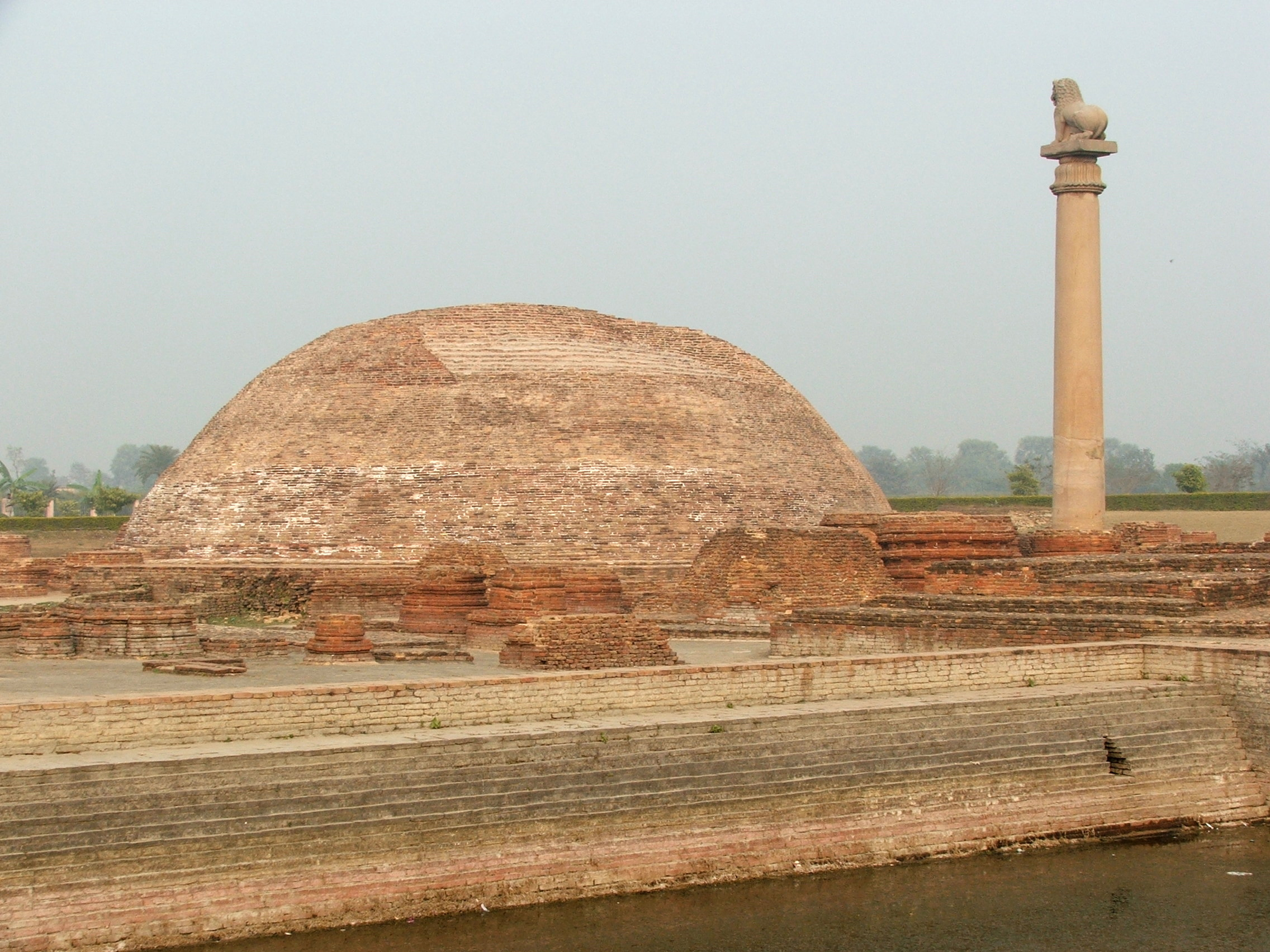
Ananda Stupa, with an Asokan pillar, at Vesālī, the capital city.

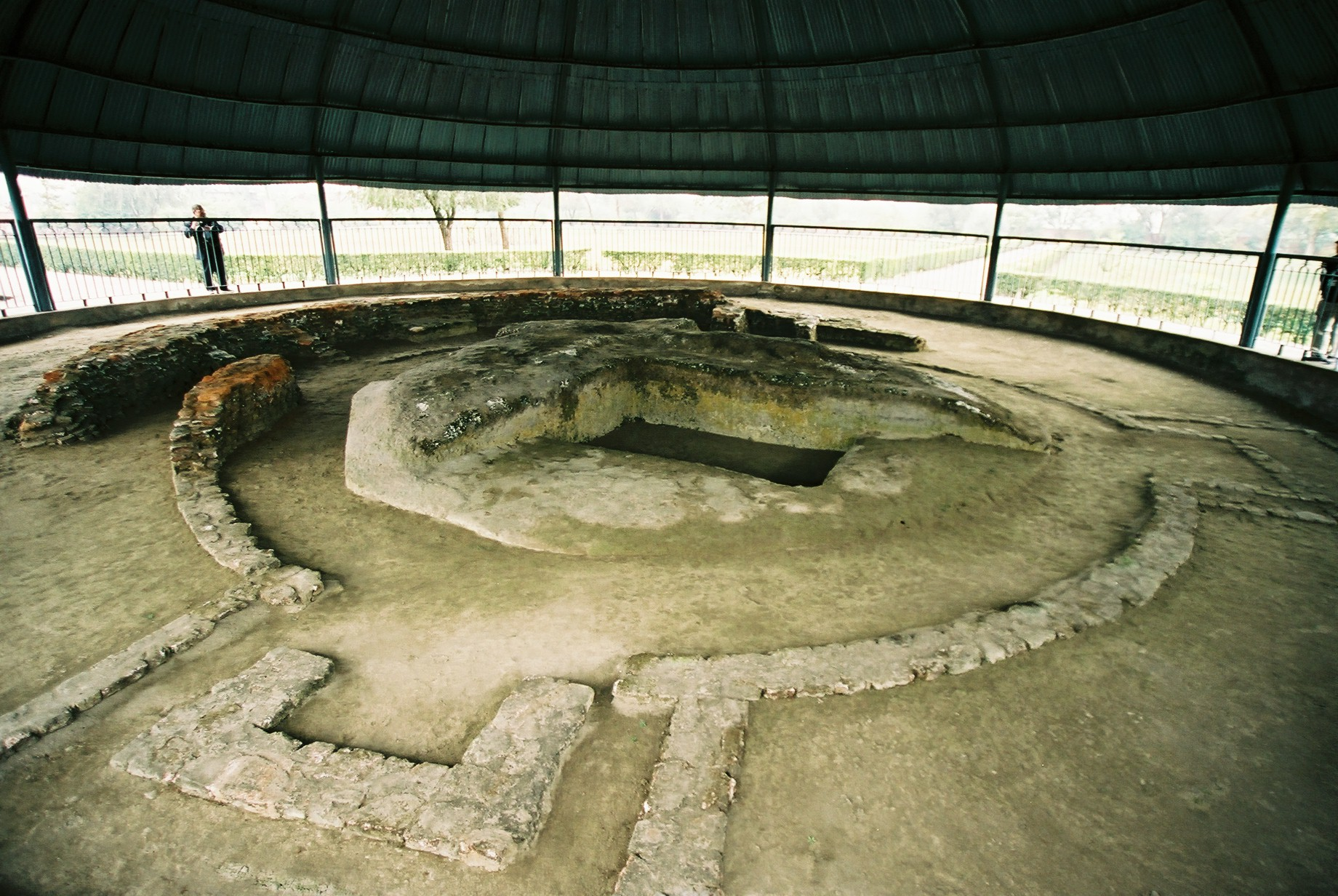
The Relic Stupa of Vaishali which was built by the Licchavis in the 5th century BC

== Name ==
The tribal name Licchavi (𑀮𑀺𑀘𑁆𑀙𑀯𑀺) is a Māgadhī Prākrit derivation of the word liccha, meaning "bear". Attested variations of the name include Licchivi, Lecchavi, and Licchaī.

The Sanskrit form of the name Licchavi would have been Ṛkṣavī (ऋक्षवी), from the Sanskrit word for bear, ṛkṣa (ऋक्ष). This Sanskrit form of the name was however not commonly used, and both Sanskrit and Pāli instead borrowed and used the Māgadhī Prakrit form Licchavi. This use of a tribal name derived from the name of the bear might have had a totemic significance.

== History ==
=== Origin ===
The Licchavikas were an Indo-Aryan tribe in the eastern Gangetic plain in the Greater Magadha cultural region. They conquered the territory of the Mahā-Videha kingdom, and temporarily occupied the Vaideha capital of Mithilā, from where they could best administer the territory of Mahā-Videha. The consequence of the occupation of Mahā-Videha by the republican Licchavikas was that the latter relatively peacefully overthrew the already weakened Vaideha monarchical system and replaced it by a republican system.

Facing the rising power of Magadha to the south of the Gaṅgā, the Licchavikas established their republic in the southern part of the former Mahā-Videha kingdom and moved their political centre to the until then marginal location of Vesālī, which the Licchavikas turned into their largest city as well as their capital and stronghold. Meanwhile, the new Videha republic existed in a limited territory centred around Mithilā and located to the north of the Licchavikas. Many members of the Vaideha aristocracy who had submitted to the Licchavikas joined them in moving to Vesālī, and therefore became members of the Licchavika ruling aristocratic Assembly.

The Licchavikas also had their own origin myth which was recounted in Pali sources written by the 5th century CE commentator, Buddhaghosa. As per this story, the Queen of Varanasi gave birth to a lump of flesh which she discards down the Ganges. The lump is found downstream by an ascetic. The lump of flesh eventually splits into two children, a boy and a girl. The ascetic raises the two children however the cowherds of the area object to this arrangement and decide to raise the children themselves. The two twins are granted their own land and married off to one another eventually becoming the progenitors of the Licchavi clan of Vesālī. The story has mostly been dismissed by scholars as "mythical" and an attempt to prove the purity of their lineage.

=== Statehood ===
Once settled around Vesālī, the Licchavikas formed a state organised as a gaṇasaṅgha (an aristocratic oligarchic republic). The Licchavikas themselves henceforth became the leading power within the territory of the former Mahā-Videha kingdom, with the Licchavika Assembly holding the sovereign and supreme rights over this territory while the Videha republic was ruled by an Assembly of the kṣatriyas residing in and around Mithilā, and governing in the name of the Licchavika Assembly. The Videha republic was thus under significant influence of the Licchavi republic, which it joined as one of the two most important members of the Vajjika League, which was a temporary league led by Licchavi within which the latter held nine of the eighteen seats of the Vajjika Council, while the Vaidehas held a smaller number of seats among the remaining 9 seats. Within the Vajjika League, Videha maintained limited autonomy concerning its domestic administration under the supervision of Licchavi, who fully controlled Vaideha foreign policy. The Nāyikas, who were a sub-group of the Vaidehas who formed an independent tribe, were another constituent republic of the Licchavi-led Vajjika League, and hence they held autonomy in matters of internal policy while their war and foreign policies were handled by the Vajjika Council, in which the Gaṇa Mukhya ("head of the republic") of the Nāyikas held a seat.

During the 6th century BCE, the Gaṇa Mukhya ("head of the republic") of the Licchavikas, that is the head of state of the Licchavikas and of their Council, was Ceṭaka or Ceḍaga, which also made him the head of the Council of the Vajjika League. Ceḍaga's sister Trisalā was married to the Nāyika Gaṇa Mukhya Siddhārtha, with this marriage having been contracted because of Siddhārtha's political importance due to the important geographical location close to Vesālī of the Nāya tribe he headed, as well as due to Siddhārtha's membership in the Vajjika Council. The son of Siddhārtha and Trisalā, that is Ceḍaga's nephew, was Mahāvīra, the 24th Jain Tīrthaṅkara. Ceṭaka became an adept of the teachings of his nephew Mahāvīra and adopted Jainism, thus making the Licchavika and Vajjika capital of Vesālī a bastion of Jainism, and his sixth daughter, Sujyeṣṭhā, became a Jain nun, while the diplomatic marriages of his other daughters to various leaders, in turn, contributed to the spreading of Jainism across northern South Asia: Prabhāvatī was married to the king Udāyana of Sindhu-Sauvīra; Padmāvatī was married to king Dadhivāhana of Aṅga; Mṛgāvatī was married to the king Śatānīka of Vatsa, with their son being the famous Udayana; Śivā was married to king Pradyota of Avanti; Jyeṣṭhā was married to Ceṭaka's nephew, Nandivardhana of Kuṇḍagāma, who was the son of Trisalā and the elder brother of Mahāvīra; Cellaṇā was married to the king Bimbisāra of Magadha.

The Licchavikas and the Mallakas were considered to be the republican states of Kāsī-Kosala by Jain sources, and both Mallaka republics joined the Licchavi-led Vajjika League to deal with danger they might have faced in common during periods of instability, and within which they held friendly relations with the Licchavikas, the Vaidehas, and the Nāyikas who were the other members of this league, although occasional quarrels did break out between these republics. Unlike the other confederate tribes such as the Vaidehas and Nāyikas, who had no sovereign rights of their own because they were dependencies of Licchavi, the Mallakas maintained their own sovereign rights within the Vajjika League.

The Licchavikas' relations with the Kosala kingdom of the king Pasenadi were friendly, although quarrels occasionally arose among them, such as when the wife of the Mallaka general Bandhula, who was himself in the service of Kosala, decided to have a bath in the sacred tank of the Licchavikas in which only Licchavika rājās were allowed to bathe.

After the death of the Buddha, the Licchavikas, the Mallakas, and the Sakyas claimed shares of his relics while the Vaidehas and the Nāyikas did not appear among the list of states claiming a share because they were dependencies of the Licchavikas without their own sovereignty, and therefore could not put forth their own claim while Licchavi could.

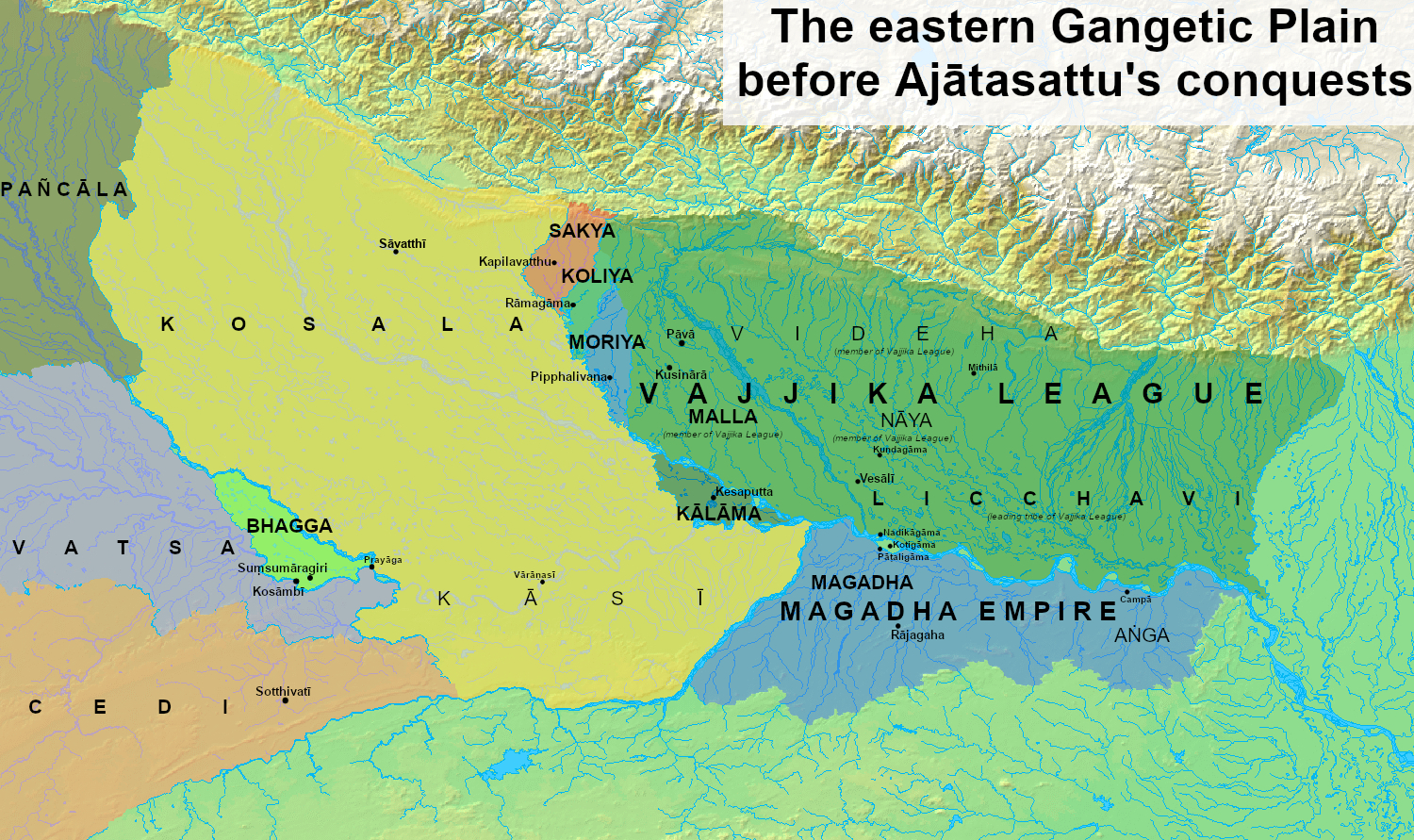
Map of the eastern Gangetic plain before Ajātasattu's conquests
(Malla shown within the Vajjika League)

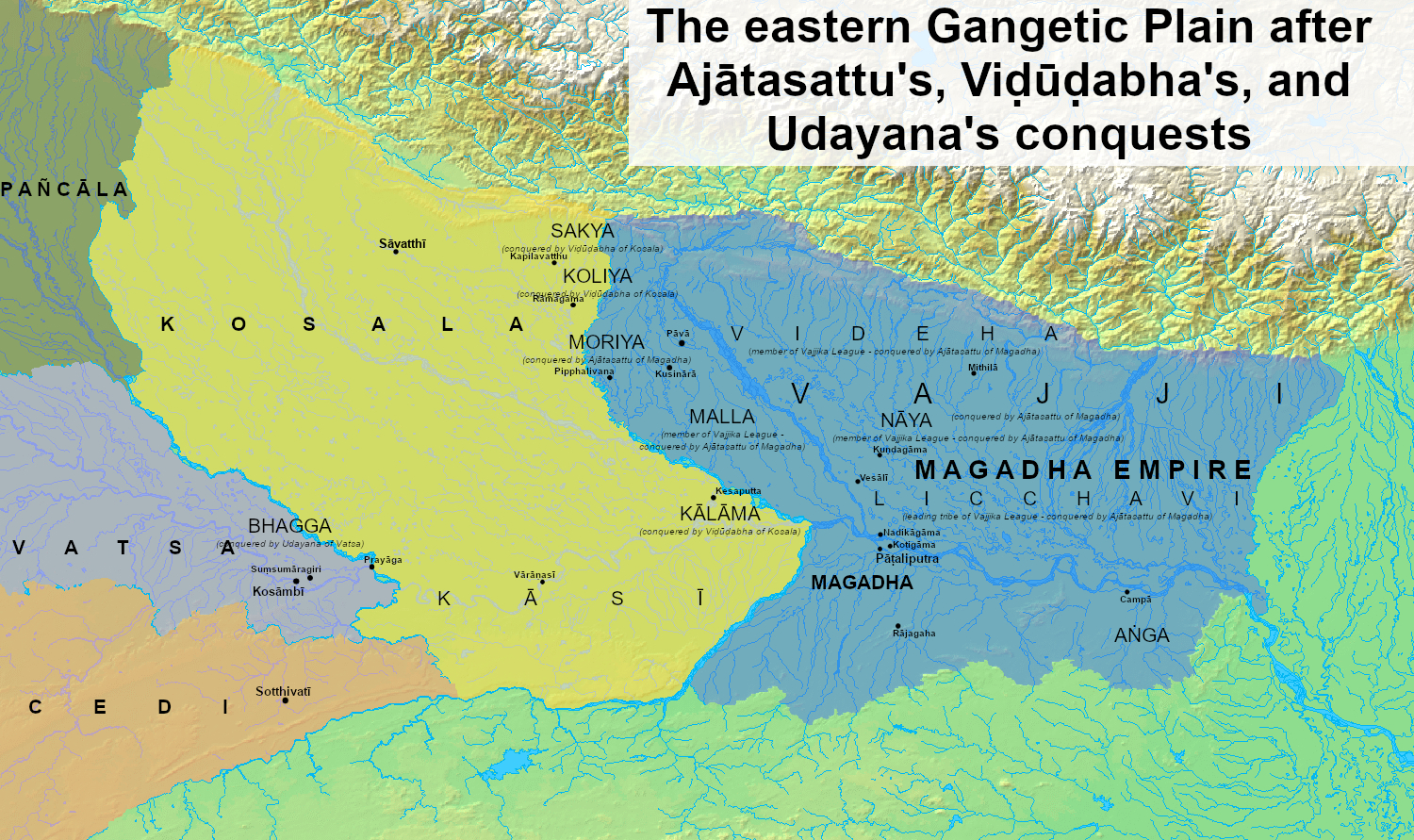
Map of the eastern Gangetic plain after Ajātasattu's conquest of the Vajjika League and of Moriya

=== Conquest by Magadha ===
The relations of the Licchavikas with their southern neighbour, the kingdom of Magadha, were initially good, and the wife of the Māgadhī king Bimbisāra was the Vesālia princess Vāsavī, who was the daughter of the Licchavika Nāyaka Sakala's son Siṃha. There were nevertheless occasional tensions between Licchavi and Magadha, such as the competition at the Mallaka capital of Kusinārā over acquiring the relics of the Buddha after his death.

In another case, the Licchavikas once invaded Māgadhī territory from across the Gaṅgā, and at some point the relations between Magadha and Licchavi permanently deteriorated as result of a grave offence committed by the Licchavikas towards the Māgadhī king Bimbisāra.

The hostilities between Licchavi and Magadha continued under the rule of Ajātasattu, who was Bimbisāra's son with another Licchavika princess, Vāsavī, after he had killed Bimbisāra and usurped the throne of Magadha. Eventually Licchavi supported a revolt against Ajātasattu by his younger step-brother and the governor of Aṅga, Vehalla, who was the son of Bimbisāra by another Licchavika wife of his, Cellanā, a daughter of Ceḍaga, who was the head of both the Licchavi republic and the Vajjika League; Bimbisāra had chosen Vehalla as his successor following Ajātasattu's falling out of his favour after the latter had been caught conspiring against him, and the Licchavikas had attempted to place Vehalla on the throne of Magadha after Ajātasattu's usurpation and had allowed Vehalla to use their capital Vesālī as base for his revolt. After the failure of this rebellion, Vehalla sought refuge at his grandfather's place in the Licchavika and Vajjika capital of Vesālī, following which Ajātasattu repeatedly attempted to negotiate with the Licchavikas-Vajjikas. After Ajātasattu's repeated negotiation attempts ended in failure, he declared war on the Vajjika League in 484 BCE.

Tensions between Licchavi and Magadha were exacerbated by the handling of the joint Māgadhī-Licchavika border post of Koṭigāma on the Gaṅgā by the Licchavika-led Vajjika League who would regularly collect all valuables from Koṭigāma and leave none to the Māgadhīs. Therefore Ajātasattu decided to destroy the Vajjika League in retaliation, but also because, as an ambitious empire-builder whose mother Vāsavī was Licchavika princess of Vaidehī descent, he was interested in the territory of the former Mahā-Videha kingdom which by then was part of the Vajjika League. Ajātasattu's hostility towards the Vajjika League was also the result of the differing forms of political organisation between Magadha and the Vajjika League, with the former being monarchical and the latter being republican, not unlike the opposition of the ancient Greek kingdom of Sparta to the democratic form of government in Athens, and the hostilities between the ancient Macedonian king Philip II to the Athenian and Theban republics.

As members of the Vajjika League, the Vaidehas, Nāyikas, and Mallakas were also threatened by Ajātasattu, and the Vajjika Gaṇa Mukhya Ceḍaga held war consultations with the rājās of the Licchavikas and Mallikas before the fight started. The Vaidehas, Nāyikas, and Mallakas therefore fought on the side of the League against Magadha. The military forces of the Vajjika League were initially too strong for Ajātasattu to be successful against them, and it required him having recourse to diplomacy and intrigues over the span of a decade to finally defeat the Vajjika League by 468 BCE and annex its territories, including Licchavi, Videha, and Nāya to the kingdom of Magadha, while the Mallakas also became part of Ajātasattu's Māgadhī empire but were allowed a limited degree of autonomy in terms of their internal administration. The Licchavikas nevertheless survived their defeat by Ajātasattu, and the structures of the older Licchavi republic subsisted within a degree local autonomy under Māgadhī rule, as attested by how the Licchavika Council instituted a festival in the memory of the decease of the Jain Tīrthaṅkara Mahāvīra.

=== Later periods ===
The Licchavikas survived as a distinct political and ethnic entity for centuries after their defeat by the Māgadhīs, and they became powerful again after the disintegration of the Maurya Empire. During this period, the Licchavika sacred tank of Abhiseka-Pokkharaṇī was enlarged and surrounded with a wall.

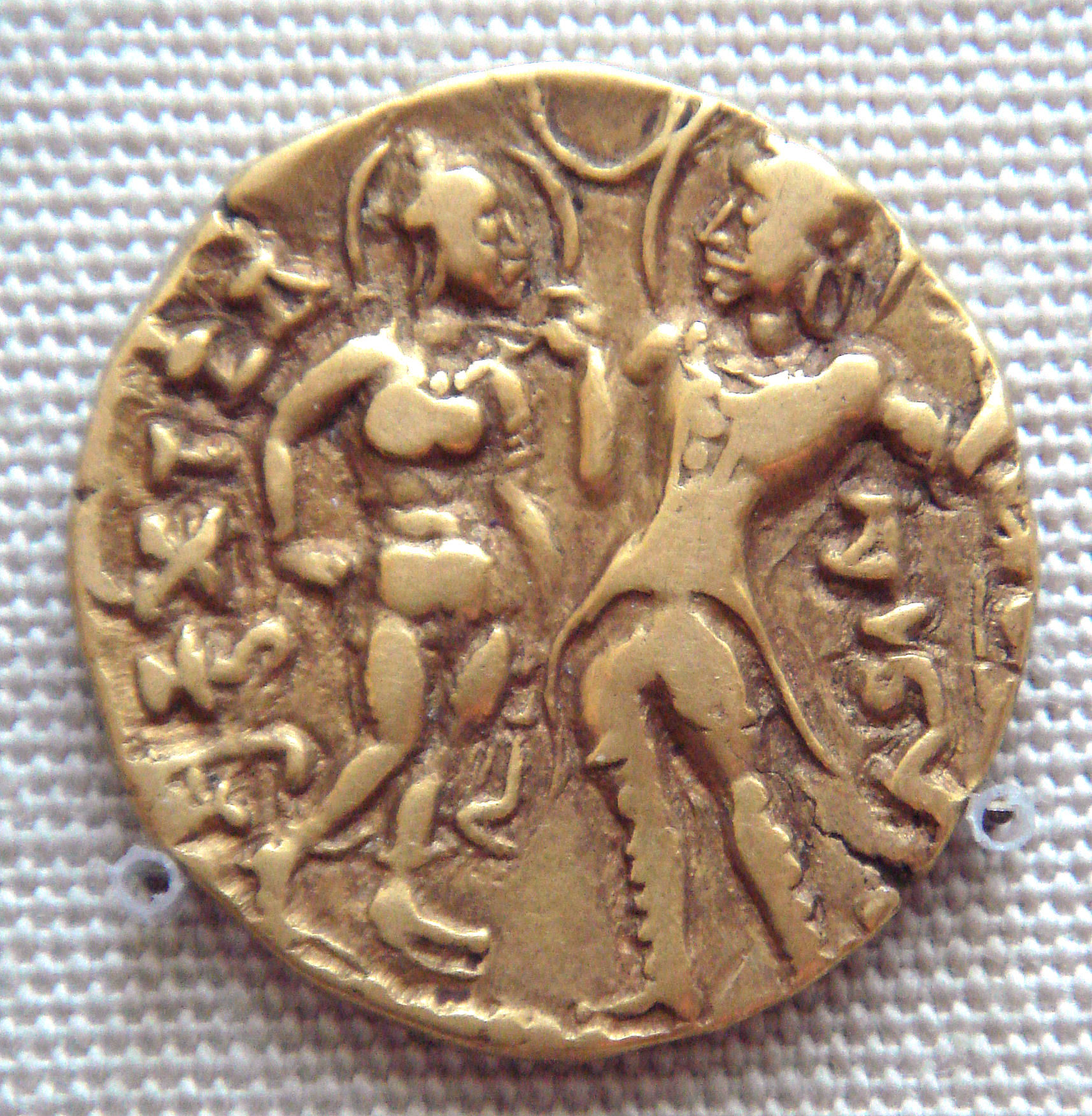
Licchavika Queen Kumaradevi and King Chandragupta I, depicted on a coin of their son Samudragupta, 350–380 CE.

The Licchavikas are mentioned for the last time during the early period of the Gupta Empire, when the Licchavika princess Kumāradevī married Chandragupta I, as attested on the legends of the coinage of their son Samudragupta, who called himself Licchavi-dauhitra ("maternal grandson of the Licchavikas") in his inscriptions.

That the Licchavikas survived beyond this period is however evidenced by how a branch of this people formed a Licchavi kingdom in Nepal.

== Religion ==
The Licchavis held a tolerant approach to religion and the Vedic religion, Buddhism and Jainism all co-existed in Vaishali under Licchavi rule. Prior to the time of the Buddha, the Licchavis worshipped Vedic deities including Indra and Prajapati. Sources also mention the Licchavis patronising Brahmins who officiated their religious functions which also receiving gifts for their work. Several shrines dedicated to Yakshas were also to be found in Vaishali.

A section of the Licchavis were followers of Pārśvanātha, the 23rd Tirthankara of Jainism. Mahavira, who was related to the Licchavis through his mother, Triśalā, was said to have been born in a family who worshipped Pārśvanātha.

The Buddha was on many occasions invited to Vaishali by the Licchavis and the former was extremely fond of them and spent much time preaching to them. The Licchavis were said to have always treated him with "great honour and reverence". It was in these circumstances that many Licchavis embraced Buddhism and many Licchavi women of noble background were ordained as nuns. Many years after his death, Vaishali continued to remain a notable centre of the Buddhis faith.

== Social and political organisation ==
=== Republican institutions ===
The Licchavi republic was organised into a gaṇasaṅgha, that is a tribal republican organisation according to which the final power and the absolute authority of the state were shared among a large section of the population.

==== The Assembly ====
Out of the total estimated 200,000 to 300,000 population of Licchavi, the tribe's governing class was composed of 7,707 unelected members (called rājā, meaning "ruler") who were constituted into the Licchavi republic's Assembly, which was the sovereign power of the state. Reflecting the Licchavikas' tribal nature, the rājās held the status of kṣatriyas, similarly to the ancient Greek system of the aristocracy of heads of houses, and they were automatically accorded membership to the Licchavika Assembly. Thus, the Licchavikas, like their Mallaka, Vaideha, and Nāyika confederates within the Vajjika League, were a kṣatriya tribe, and their rājās were the heads of the kṣatriya ruling families of Licchavi living in and near Vesālī, who held their titles for life unless they were physically disabled or had been found guilty of serious crimes, and had full political rights at the Assembly of Vesālī, which they had the right to attend and within which they held seats, although they were not obligated to always attend its sessions. Power was shared evenly by these rājās and was exercised by the majority.

The status of the Licchavika rājās was hereditary and they were succeeded by their eldest sons, who were called Licchavi-kumāra ("princes of Licchavi"), held the title of uparājā ("viceroy"), and represented their fathers in situations when the latter were ill or otherwise unable to attend an Assembly session. These Licchavi-kumāras officially would, during the General Assembly of Vesālī, succeed their fathers who had died during the preceding year or had become too old to continue exercising their duties. This ceremony consisted of the representatives of the Licchavika kṣatriya families taking a sacred bath before being anointed as rājās, and was held at the sacred tank, named Abhiseka-Pokkharaṇī in Pāli (Abhiṣeka-Puṣkariṇī in Sanskrit), where only the Licchavika rulers were allowed to bathe. Before being anointed as rājās, these Licchavi-kumāras were instructed on the discipline of government by their fathers, who encouraged them to maintain their traditional republican political organisation, although despite also being the rājās' uparājās, they had no voting rights unless they were representing a rājā or had themselves been appointed as rājās.

Non-kṣatriyas had no political rights in the Licchavi republic, similarly to how only the Patricians held political power during the earlier periods of the Roman Republic. On rare occasions, some brāhmaṇas and vaiśyas were granted full political rights and were appointed to high positions, but these were exceptions granted to unusually distinguished men, such as in the case of the Māgadhī minister Vassakāra who became a judge at Vesālī, the Vaideha chief minister Khaṇḍa who resigned from his post due to his colleagues' jealousy and settled at Vesālī where he quickly became the senāpati of Licchavi's army, and the Vaideha minister Sakala who had to flee from his colleagues' jealousy and moved to Vesālī where he became a prominent citizen and was elected Nāyaka; Sakala had two sons, Gopāla and Siṃha, who both married Vesālia women, and Siṃha's daughter Vāsavī married the Māgadhī king Bimbisāra. Otherwise, non-citizens who held complaints or grievances had to approach the Assembly or the Council directly.

The Licchavika Assembly functioned like the Ancient Greek Athenian boulē, the Roman magistracy, and the Germanic thing. Like the Germanic thing, the Assembly of the Licchavikas had no division between the legislative, executive, and judicial functions, and it tried legal cases and elected the consul and the general-in-chief.

In normal times, the General Assembly of Vesālī met only once a year during the annual spring festival for important and serious issues, and otherwise the full Assembly's meetings would have been held only on the occasion of specific military, social, and economic events. A smaller body of the Licchavika rājās instead met more often for administrative purposes in the santhāgāra, a mote-hall-like meeting place located in the capital and the large cities of the Licchavi republic. Similarly to the earlier Vedic sabhā, the santhāgāra was a political institution, as well as the venue for religious and social functions. Among the officials of the Assembly was the āsana-paññāpaka ("regulator of seats") who was elected by the Assembly.

==== Functioning of the Assembly ====
Meetings of the Assembly were called by the sound of a drum, after which the rājās assembled in the santhāgāra, and voting (called chaṇḍa, meaning "free choice") was done through the means of pieces of wood called salākās. The salākā-gāhāpaka ("collector of the wood pieces") was an important office whose holder was elected because of his known honesty and impartiality, and his consent as to whether he would accept the post was required, after which whoever had proposed this candidate had to demand the approval of the saṅgha: those who supported the candidature remained silent while those opposed to it spoke and proposed other candidates, after which a quorum was required.

To ensure the presence and completion of the quorum, the Assembly had another officer titled the gaṇa-pūraka, who was a member of the Assembly either volunteered his services or was appointed by the Council to inform the members of the Assembly of proceedings to be held in the Assembly hall.

When the Licchavikas held elections, the āsana-paññāpaka announced that elections were to be held in the Assembly hall, where the gathered members of the Assembly put names forward and salākās were distributed. The gaṇa-pūraka counted the participants and determined whether the quorum had been filled or not.

==== The Gaṇa Mukhya (Consul) ====
The Gaṇa Mukhya was the Licchavi republic's chief officer, that is the supreme rājā, who was both the head of the state and the supreme judge, and was elected by the General Assembly of Vesālī for a limited period of time generally lasting between 10 and 15 years. This consul rājā, the Gaṇa Mukhya, was elected from among the 7,707 rājās in the Assembly: when the āsana-paññāpaka announced that elections were to be held for the title of the Gaṇa Mukhya, the members of the Assembly put names forward and salākās were distributed; the gaṇa-pūraka counted the participants and determined whether the quorum had been filled or not. The criteria for election to the post of Gaṇa Mukhya like his age, political wisdom, strength of character, bravery in battle, eloquence in the Assembly, and popularity among the citizens.

Once elected, the Gaṇa Mukhya presided over the Assembly in whose name he wielded supreme power in the republic, and shared his power with a uparājā (viceroy), a senāpati (general-in-chief), and a bhaṇḍāgārika (treasurer). The uparājā was elected for a limited period of time like the supreme rājā, while the holder of the office of bhaṇḍāgārika was likely replaced less often, while the senāpati was appointed for life.

==== The Council ====
In practice, the legislative, executive, and judicial functions of the Assembly were performed by a small senate-like body, that is the Assembly's inner council, the Licchavika Council, made up of nine rājās, consisting of the Gaṇa Mukhya and the aṭṭhakulikas, that is eight councillor rājās elected from among members of the Assembly by the eight clans of the Licchavikas. The aṭṭhakulikas were elected following the same procedure through which the Gaṇa Mukhya was elected, although nominations of names for the aṭṭhakulikas were done separately, one for each of the eight Licchavika clans, and the election for the aṭṭhakulika might have taken place among each clan independently, with only members of the Assembly being allowed to vote. Once the successful candidates had been elected, they were solemnly consecrated by being honoured with a traditional ceremonial bath and anointed at the Abhiseka-Pokkharaṇī during the spring festival.

This Council met regularly to administer the public affairs of the Licchavi republic and had to answer for its actions to the Assembly; the Council was thus in charge of planning and policy of the Licchavi republic, and had to demand the approval of the Licchavika Assembly for important matters. Other tasks of the Council would have included preparing the agenda for the Licchavi republic's annual General Assembly, the consecration of the uparājās, and handling other important issues, as well as arranging for filling posts and ranks whose holders had died or could not otherwise perform their duties.

In the Council's judicial role, only the aṭṭhakulikas, that is the eight councillor rājās representing the eight Licchavika clans, tried judicial cases while the Gaṇa Mukhya was not a member of the jury: according to the normal judicial process among the Licchavikas, if a criminal had not been exonerated by lesser institutions of the republic, they were sent to be tried by the aṭṭhakulikas who, if they found the criminal to be guilty, would hand them over to the senāpati.

==== Vaideha institutions ====
Since Videha was a dependency of Licchavi, the Vaideha Council, which was the body with the supreme authority of the internal administration of the Videha republic, held the supreme power of Videha under the administration of the Licchavikas.

==== State of emergency ====
In normal situations, the Licchavika Council carried out the administration of the Licchavi republic without much difficulty without needing to call emergency meetings of the Assembly. However during the periods of hostilities with Magadha, both the Council and the Assembly met frequently more than once a year, and the Council often consulted with the Assembly, with the importance of the measures of the Assembly gaining in importance during the continued states of emergency and war, similarly to how the power and prestige of the Roman Senate increased during the Punic Wars and the Roman–Greek wars.

Under these circumstances, the Assembly was the supreme authority in all governmental domains while the role of the Council was only to implements its requests and commands.

=== Villages ===
Within Licchavika territory, artisans such as carpenters, smiths and potters, and who possibly did not ethnically belong to the Licchavi tribe, as well as brāhmaṇas, had villages of their own.

=== Role of women ===
Women in the Licchavi republic held no citizen rights at Vesālī, and were largely reduced to the role of being housewives. Although women participated in Licchavika social life, they were not allowed to participate in the political assemblies.

==== Ambapālī ====
The elected courtesan Ampabālī was the woman held to be the most beautiful in Licchavi and was elected for life to be the wife (Nagaravadhu) of the Licchavi republic itself. The Licchavikas honoured Ambapālī during the week of the spring festival.

=== The army ===
The Licchavikas possessed a strong army which also acted as the army of the Vajjika League, and with which they were able to fight against the rising power of Magadha. When not engaged in warfare, the soldiers would be cultivating their own farms or amusing themselves at Vesālī.

=== The police ===
The Licchavikas possessed a body of peons or police. Although kṣatriyas were not forbidden from joining this police force, the ruling families did not participate in this lower ranking form of service, and the members of the Licchavi police were recruited primarily from the artisan classes.

== See also ==
- The Licchavi kingdom of Nepal
