= Magadha–Vajji war =

Series of wars in Ancient India

Date	484–468 BCE
Location	Modern-day Bihar, India
Result	Magadhī victory
Territorial changes	Magadhī annexation of the Vajjika League

Belligerents
Magadha	Vajjika League

Commanders and leaders
Ajatashatru	Chetaka ‡‡

Strength
Unknown	Unknown

Casualties and losses
Unknown	Unknown

The Magadha–Vajji war was a conflict between the Haryanka dynasty of Magadha and the neighbouring Vajjika League which was led by the Licchavikas. The conflict is remembered in both Buddhist and Jain traditions. The conflict ended in defeat for the Vajjika League, and the Māgadhīs annexing their territory.

== Conflict ==
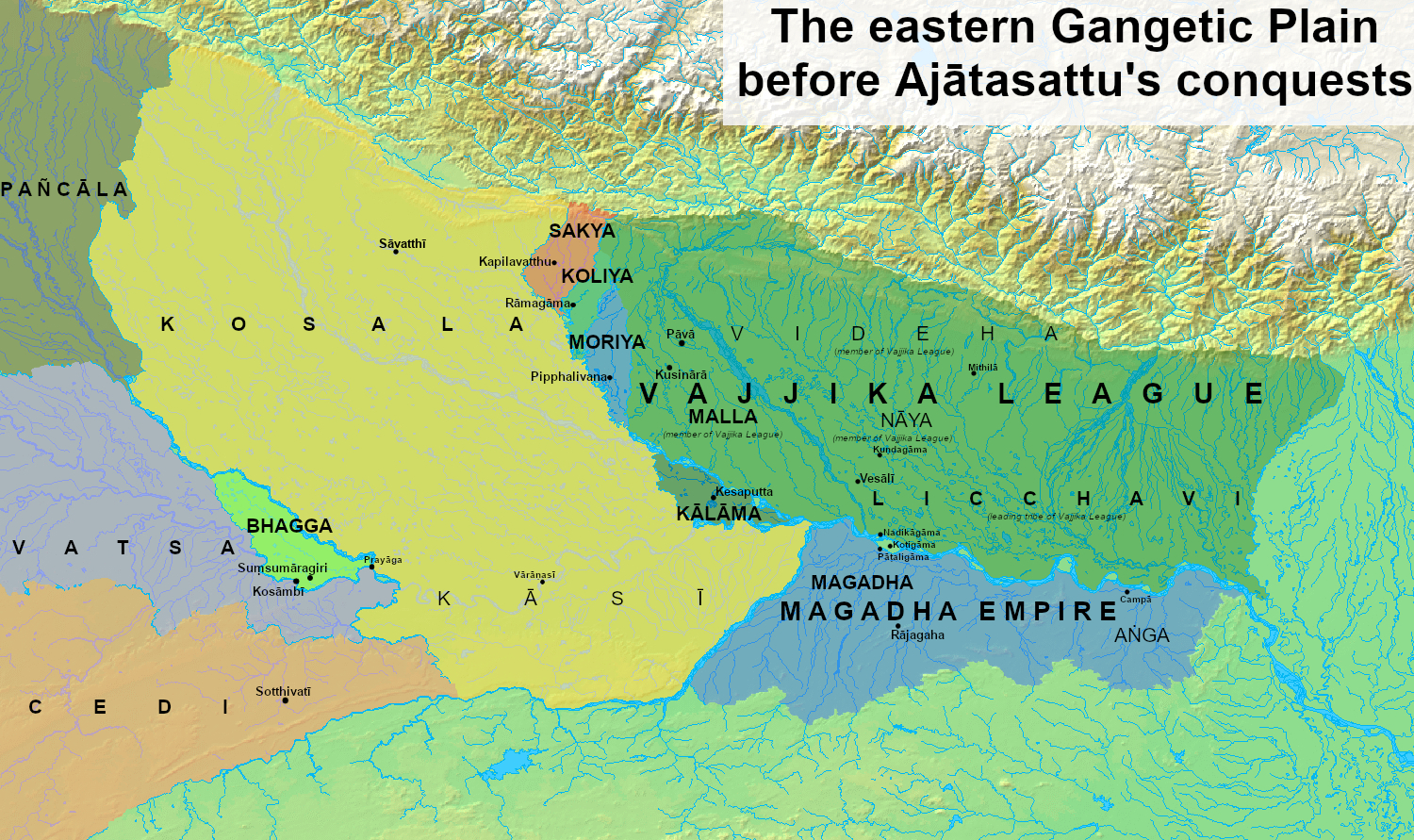
Map of the eastern Gangetic plain before Ajatashatru's conquests

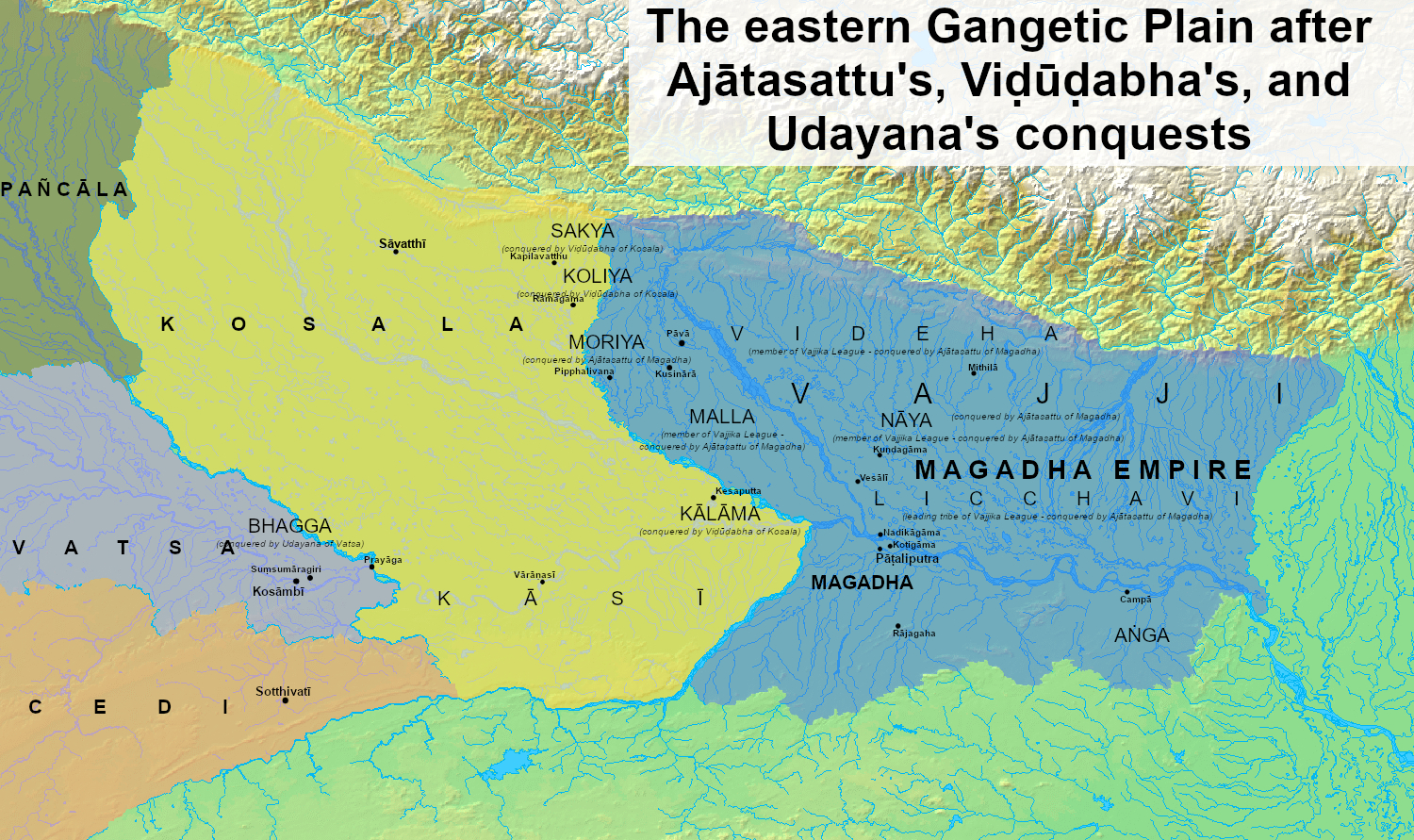
Map of the eastern Gangetic plain after Ajatashatru's conquest of the Vajjika League and of Moriya

Depiction of Ajatashatru of Magadha

The relations of the Licchavikas with their southern neighbour, the Kingdom of Magadha, were initially good, and the wife of the Māgadhī king Bimbisāra was the Vaishali princess Vāsavī, who was the daughter of the Licchavika Nāyaka (Captain) Sakala's son Siṃha. There were nevertheless occasional tensions between Licchavi and Magadha, such as the competition at the Mallaka capital of Kushinagar over acquiring the relics of the Buddha after his death.

In another case, the Licchavikas once invaded Māgadhī territory from across the Ganges, and at some point the relations between Magadha and Licchavi permanently deteriorated as result of a grave offence committed by the Licchavikas towards the Māgadhī king Bimbisāra.

The hostilities between Licchavi and Magadha continued under the rule of Ajatshatru, who was Bimbisāra's son with another Licchavika princess, Vāsavī, after he had killed Bimbisāra and usurped the throne of Magadha. Eventually Licchavi supported a revolt against Ajātasattu by his younger step-brother and the Governor of Aṅga, Vehalla, who was the son of Bimbisāra by another Licchavika wife of his, Cellanā, a daughter of Ceḍaga, who was the consul (gaṇa mukhya) of both the Licchavi Republic and the Vajjika League; Bimbisāra had chosen Vehalla as his successor following Ajatshatru's falling out of his favour after the latter had been caught conspiring against him, and the Licchavikas had attempted to place Vehalla on the throne of Magadha after Ajatshatru's usurpation and had allowed Vehalla to use their capital Vaishali as base for his revolt. After the failure of this rebellion, Vehalla sought refuge at his grandfather's place in the Licchavika and Vajjika capital of Vaishali, following which Ajatshatru repeatedly attempted to negotiate with the Licchavikas-Vajjikas. After Ajatshatru's repeated negotiation attempts ended in failure, he declared war on the Vajjika League in 484 BCE.

Tensions between Licchavi and Magadha were exacerbated by the handling of the border post of Koṭigāma on the Ganges by the Licchavika-led Vajjika League who would regularly collect all valuables from Koṭigāma and leave none to the Māgadhīs. Therefore Ajātasatru decided to destroy the Vajjika League in retaliation, but also because, as an ambitious empire-builder whose mother Vāsavī was Licchavika princess of Vaidehī descent, he was interested in the territory of the former Videha kingdom which by then was part of the Vajjika League. Ajātasattu's hostility towards the Vajjika League was also the result of the differing forms of political organisation between Magadha and the Vajjika League, with the former being monarchical and the latter being republican, not unlike the opposition of the Ancient Greek kingdom of Sparta to the democratic form of government in Athens, and the hostilities between the ancient Macedonian king Philip II to the Athenian and Theban republics.

As members of the Vajjika League, the Vaidehas, Nāyikas, and Mallakas were also threatened by Ajātasattu, and the Vajjika Gaṇa Mukhya Ceḍaga held war consultations with the gaṇa mukhyas of the Licchavikas and Mallikas before the fight started. The Vaidehas, Nāyikas, and Mallakas therefore fought on the side of the League against Magadha. The military forces of the Vajjika League were initially too strong for Ajātasattu to be successful against them, and it required him having recourse to diplomacy and intrigues over the span of a decade to finally defeat the Vajjika League by 468 BCE and annex its territories, including Licchavi, Videha, and Nāya to the Kingdom of Magadha, while the Mallakas maintained their independence but lost their political importance. The Licchavikas nevertheless survived their defeat by Ajātasattu, and the structures of the older Licchavi Republic subsisted within a degree local autonomy under Māgadhī rule, as attested by how the Licchavika Council instituted a festival in the memory of the decease of the Jain Tīrthaṅkara Mahāvīra.

== In popular culture ==
Samakkhi Phet Kham Chan, a Thai literature written by Chit Burathat, based from this war that recorded in Buddhism tradition.

== See also ==
- List of wars involving Magadha

== Sources ==
- Sharma, J. P. (1968). Republics in Ancient India, C. 1500 B.C.-500 B.C. Leiden, Netherlands: E. J. Brill. ISBN 978-9-004-02015-3.
