= Dharma Vardhiny Sabha =

Great ancient council

Dharma Vardhiny Sabha is a great ancient council conducted by the emperors of the post-Vedic age to debate matters of importance for the wellbeing of humanity and the planet earth. This tradition was observed and upheld by King Rama of the Solar dynasty and by King Yudhishthira of the Kuru dynasty. The Sabha in Gwalior sought to spread education among women.

== Etymology ==
=== Dharma ===
Dharma is a concept in the Sanatana Dharma tradition and has multiple meanings. It has been used in ancient Vedic texts and also the epic Ramayana where the protagonist Rama is said to Dharma manifest in human form. It is also said to have slight changes in each of the four yugas namely –

1. Satya Yuga
2. Treta Yuga
3. Dvapara Yuga and
4. Kali Yuga

=== Vardhiny ===
Vardhanam is a samskrit word which means to increase or to escalate.

=== Sabha ===
Sabha is a Sanskrit term which stands for an assembly or a council.

== Definition ==
Dharma Vardhiny Sabha means a council to increase the awareness of the established Dharma. Thus, any council that propagates and increases the awareness among people of the established dharma is known as the Dharma Vardhiny Sabha.
