= Chetaka =

Consul of the Licchavi tribe, died 468 BCE

Chetaka or Chedaga
- Ceṭaka or Ceḍaga

Gaṇa Mukhya of the Licchavi Republic and the Vajjika
- In office ? – 468 BCE

Personal details
- Born: c. 6th or 5th century BCE
- Died: 468 BCE Vesālī, Licchavi Republic, Vajjika League
- Relations: Vardhamana (nephew)
- Parent(s): Keka (father); Yaśomatī (mother)

Military service
- Battles/wars: Magadha-Vajji war

Chetaka (Sanskrit: Ceṭaka) or Chedaga (Sanskrit: Ceḍaga) was the consul (gana mukhya) of the Licchavi republic during the 5th century BCE.

== Life ==
Ceṭaka was the son of Keka and Yaśomatī, he belonged to the Haihaya clan and he had a sister named Trishala.

Ceḍaga was one of the nine elected rājās ("rulers") of the Council of the Licchavi tribe, which was the supreme authority of the Licchavikas' gaṇasaṅgha (aristocratic republic) administration, of which he was the head. As the leader of the Licchavika Council, Ceḍaga was also the Gaṇa Mukhya ("chief of the republic"), that is, the elected consul of the republic, which also made him the head of the Vajjika League led by the Licchavikas.

=== Diplomatic marriages ===
Ceṭaka contracted several diplomatic marriages between members of his family and the leaders of other republics and kingdoms. One such marriage was the one between his sister, Trisalā, and the Nāyika Gaṇa Mukhya Siddhārtha, which was contracted because of Siddhārtha's political importance due to its important geographical location close to Vesālī of the Nāya tribe he headed, as well as due to Siddhārtha's membership in the Vajjika Council. Siddhārtha and Trisalā had a son, Mahāvīra, who became the 24th Jain Tīrthaṅkara.

Other marital alliances concluded by Ceṭaka included the marriages of his daughters:

- Prabhāvatī was married to the king Udāyana of Sindhu-Sauvīra
- Padmāvatī was married to king Dadhivāhana of Aṅga
- Mṛgāvatī was married to the king Śatānīka of Vatsa, with their son being the famous Udayana
- Śivā was married to king Pradyota of Avanti
- Jyeṣṭhā was married to Ceṭaka's nephew, Nandivardhana of Kuṇḍagāma, who was the son of Trisalā and the elder brother of Mahāvīra
- Cellaṇā was married to the king Bimbisāra of Magadha

=== Religious policy ===
Ceṭaka became an adept of the teachings of his nephew Mahāvīra and adopted Jainism, thus making the Licchavika and Vajjika's capital of Vesālī a centre of Jainism. Ceṭaka's sixth daughter, Sujyeṣṭhā, became a Jain nun. The marriages of Ceṭaka's daughters to various leaders, in turn, contributed to the spreading of Jainism across northern South Asia.

Ceṭaka's favourable attitude towards Jainism was why Buddhist sources did not pay notice to him, since he used his power to support the 'Jainism' in his country.

=== War against Magadha ===
Relations between the Licchavikas and their southern neighbour, theKingdom of Magadha, were initially good, with the wife of the Māgadhī king Bimbisāra being the Vesālia princess Vāsavī, who was the daughter of the Licchavika Nāyaka Sakala's son Siṃha. There were nevertheless occasional tensions between Licchavi and Magadha, such as competition with the Mallaka capital of Kusinārā over acquiring the relics of the Buddha after his death.

In another occasion, the Licchavikas invaded Māgadhī territory from across the Gaṅgā. Later, relations between Magadha and Licchavi permanently deteriorated as result of a grave offence committed by the Licchavikas towards the Māgadhī king Bimbisāra.

The hostilities between Licchavi and Magadha continued under the rule of Ajātasattu, who was Bimbisāra's son with another Licchavika princess, Vāsavī, after he had killed Bimbisāra and usurped the throne of Magadha. Eventually Licchavi supported a revolt against Ajātasattu by his younger step-brother and the governor of Aṅga, Vehalla, who was the son of Bimbisāra by another Licchavika wife of his, Cellaṇā, the daughter of Ceḍaga. Bimbisāra had chosen Vehalla as his successor following Ajātasattu's falling out of favour after the latter had been caught conspiring against him. The Licchavikas had then attempted to place Vehalla on the throne of Magadha after Ajātasattu's usurpation and had allowed Vehalla to use their capital Vesālī as a base for his revolt. After the failure of this rebellion, Vehalla sought refuge at his grandfather's place in the Licchavika and Vajjika capital of Vesālī, following which Ajātasattu repeatedly attempted to negotiate with the Licchavikas-Vajjikas. After Ajātasattu's repeated negotiation attempts ended in failure, he declared war on the Vajjika League in 484 BCE.

As members of the Vajjika League, the Vaidehas, Nāyikas, and Mallakas were also threatened by Ajātasattu, and, as the Vajjika Gaṇa Mukhya, Ceḍaga held war consultations with the rājās of the Licchavikas and Mallikas before the fighting started. The Vaidehas, Nāyikas, and Mallakas therefore fought on the side of the League against Magadha. The military forces of the Vajjika League were initially too strong for Ajātasattu to be successful against them, and it required him to have recourse to diplomacy and intrigues over a number of years to finally defeat the Vajjika League by 468 BCE and annex its territories, including Licchavi, Videha, and Nāya to the Kingdom of Magadha. Meanwhile, the Mallakas also became part of Ajātasattu's Māgadhī Empire but were allowed a limited degree of autonomy in terms of their internal administration.

After the Licchavikas' defeat, Ceḍaga committed suicide by jumping into a well with an iron statue tied to his neck. His tribe nevertheless survived their defeat by Ajātasattu, and the structures of the older Licchavi republic continued with a degree of local autonomy under Māgadhī rule, as attested by how the Licchavika Council instituted a festival in the memory of the death of the Jain Tīrthaṅkara, Mahāvīra.

== See also ==
- Mahajanapadas
- Dighanikaya
- Ambapali

== Sources ==
- Deo, Shantaram Bhalchandra (1956). History of Jaina Monachism from Inscriptions and Literature. Pune, India: Deccan College Post-Graduate and Research Institute. ISBN 978-9-333-68377-7.
- Jain, Kailash Chand (1974). Lord Mahāvīra and His Times. Delhi, India: Motilal Banarsidass. p. 66. ISBN 978-8-120-80805-8.
- Sharma, J. P. (1968). Republics in Ancient India, C. 1500 B.C.-500 B.C. Leiden, Netherlands: E. J. Brill. ISBN 978-9-004-02015-3.
- Sikdar, Jogendra Chandra (1964). Studies in the Bhagawatīsūtra. Muzaffarpur, Bihar, India: Research Institute of Prakrit, Jainology & Ahimsa. pp. 388–464.
