= Triśalā =

Mother of Mahavira, the 24th Tirthankara of Jainism

Trishala
- Mother of last Tirthankara
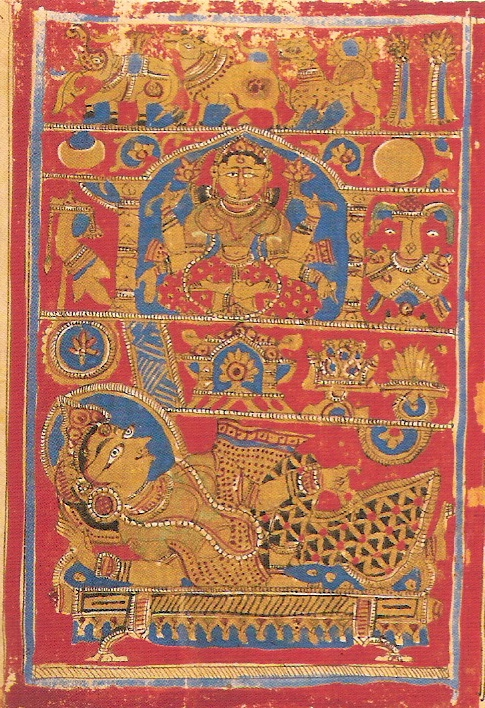
- Kalpa Sūtra miniature of Queen Trishala (bottom) and her auspicious dreams, c. 1472.
- Other names: Priyakarini , Videhadatta

Genealogy
- Parents: Keka (father); Yaśomatī (mother)
- Siblings: Chetaka
- Spouse: Siddhartha
- Children: Nandivardhana; Vardhamana; Sudarśanā
- Dynasty: Licchavi clan (by birth); Nāya/Nātha (by marriage)

Trishala, also known as Videhadatta, Priyakarini, or Trishala Mata (Mother Trishala), was the mother of Mahavira, the 24th Tirthankara of Jainism, and wife of the Gaṇa Mukhya, Siddhartha of Kundagrama, of present-day Bihar. She finds mention in the Jain texts.

== Life ==
Trishala was born as a princess of the Licchavi Republic. The Jain text Uttarapurāṇa details the life of all Tirthankaras and other Salakapurusa. It is mentioned in the text that Consul Chetaka of Vaishali had ten brothers and seven sisters. His sister Priyakarini (Trishala) was married to Siddartha. As per Shvetambara texts and Indologist Hermann Jacobi, Vardhamana Mahavira's mother Trishala was sister of Consul Chetaka. His third wife, Kshema, was a daughter of the chief of the Madra tribe of Punjab. Trishala had seven sisters, one of whom was initiated into the Jain monastic order while the other six married famous kings, including Bimbisara of Magadha. She and her husband Siddhartha were followers of Parshvanatha, the 23rd Tirthankara according to the second chapter of the Śvētāmbara Ācārāṅga Sūtra. According to Jain texts, Trishala carried her son for nine months and seven and a half days during the 6th century BC. However, Shvetambaras generally believe that he was conceived by Devananda, the wife of a Brahmin Rishabhadatta and the fetus was transferred to Trishala's womb by Indra because all Tirthankaras have to be Kshatriyas. All this is mentioned in the Shvetambara text, Kalpasutra, which is primarily a biography of the Tirthankaras.

== Auspicious dreams ==
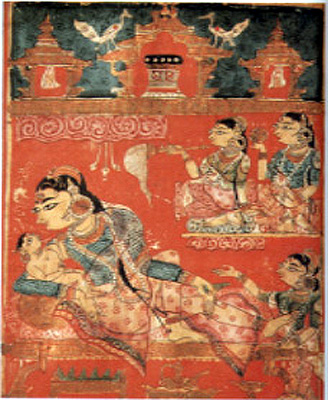
Detail of a leaf with, The Birth of Mahavira (the 24th Jain Tirthankara), from the Kalpa Sutra, c. 1375–1400.

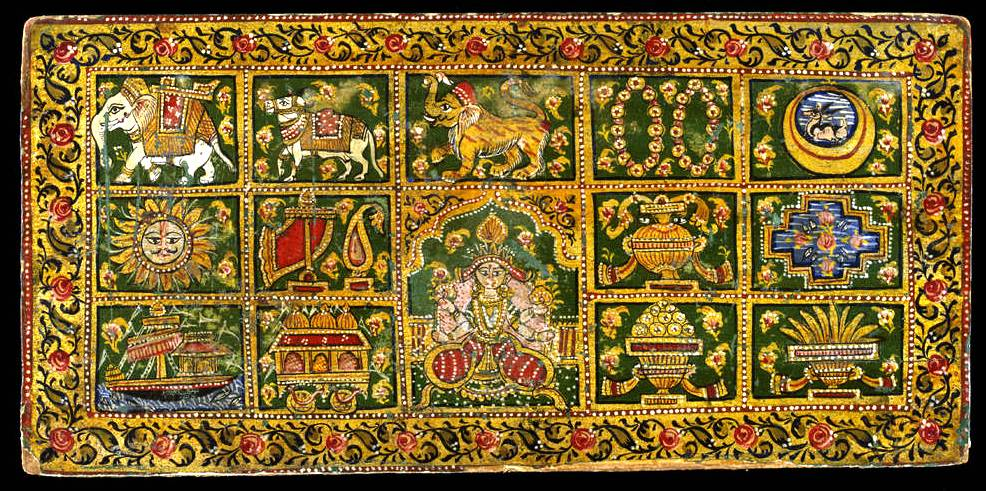
Auspicious 14 dreams seen by a tirthankara's mother during pregnancy as an ornamentation on cover of 19th-century manuscript

According to the Jain scriptures, the mother of Tirthankaras sees a number of auspicious dreams when the embryo is enliven through the descent of the life (soul) in the mortal body. This is celebrated as Garbha Kalyanaka. According to the Digambara sect, the number of dreams is 16. While the Shvetambara sect believe them to be only fourteen. After seeing these dreams, she woke her husband Consul Siddhartha and told him about the dreams. The next day Siddhartha summoned the scholars of the court and asked them to explain the meaning of the dreams. According to the scholars, these dreams meant that the child would be born very strong, courageous, and full of virtue.

1. Dream of an elephant (Airavata)
2. Dream of a bull
3. Dream of a lion
4. Dream of Laxmi
5. Dream of flowers
6. Dream of a full moon
7. Dream of the sun
8. Dream of a large banner
9. Dream of a silver urn (Kalasha)
10. Dream of a lake filled with lotuses
11. Dream of a milky-white sea
12. Dream of a celestial vehicle (Vimana)
13. Dream of a heap of gems
14. Dream of a fire without smoke
15. Dream of a pair of fish (Digambara)
16. Dream of a throne (Digambara)

== Legacy ==
Today members of the Jain religion celebrate the event of the Dreams. This event is called Swapna Darshan and is often part of "Ghee Boli".

The parents of Tirthankaras and their mothers in particular are worshipped among Jains and are frequently depicted in paintings and sculpture.

== See also ==
- Marudevi
- Siddhartha of Kundagrama
