= Nandivardhana of Kundagrama =

6th-century BC Kshatriya King from the Ikshvaku dynasty

Nandivardhana
- Gaṇa Mukhya of the Nāya Republic
- Predecessor: Siddhartha

Genealogy
- Parents: Siddhartha (father); Trishala (mother)
- Siblings: Vardhamana; Sudarśanā
- Spouse: Jyeṣṭhā
- Dynasty: Nāya/Nātha

Nandivardhana was a chief of the Nāya Republic in Kundagrama, a suburb of Vaishali (Basarh in modern-day Bihar). He was the elder brother of Mahavira, the 24th Jain Tirthankara. His father was Siddhartha..According to the second chapter of the Śvētāmbara Ācārāṅga Sūtra, Siddhartha and his family were devotees of Parshvanatha.

== Sources ==
- Dundas, Paul (2002) [1992]. The Jains (Second ed.). Routledge. ISBN 978-0-415-26605-5.
- Jain, Kailash Chand (1991). Lord Mahāvīra and His Times. Motilal Banarsidass. ISBN 978-81-208-0805-8.
