= Siddhartha of Kundagrama =

Father of Mahavira, the 24th and last Jain Tirthankara

Siddhartha
- Gaṇa Mukhya of the Nāya Republic
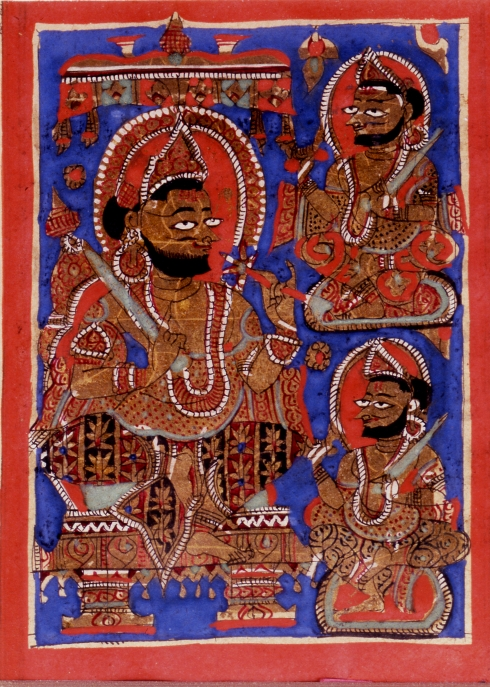
- Gaṇa Mukhya Siddhartha instructs his courtiers to summon astrologers to interpret the dreams of his wife Trishala, Kalpa Sutra, 1503.
- Other names: Śreyānśa, Yaśasvī
- Successor: Nandivardhana

Genealogy
- Siblings: Supārśva; Yaśodayā
- Spouse: Trishala
- Children: Nandivardhana; Vardhamana; Sudarśanā
- Dynasty: Nāya/Nātha

Siddhartha was the father of Mahavira (Vardhamana), the 24th Jain Tirthankara. He was a Kshatriya ruler and the Gaṇa Mukhya of the Nāya clan in Kundagrama, a suburb of Vaishali. He was married to Licchavi princess Trishala (sister of Chetaka of Vaishali).

The parents of Tirthankaras and their mothers in particular are worshipped among Jains and are frequently depicted in paintings and sculpture. According to the second chapter of the Śvētāmbara Ācārāṅga Sūtra, Siddhartha and his family were devotees of Parshvanatha.After his death, Nandivardhana became the gaṇa mukhya of the Nāya Republic.

Siddhartha and Trishala died by observing Santhara (fast unto death) when Vardhamana was 28 years of age. Following his parents' demise, Vardhamana decided to take permission from his uncle Suparshva and elder brother Nandivardhana, who dissuaded him from renouncing worldly life for two more years because he was unable to bear the loss of his parents as well as his brother, Vardhamana.

== See also ==
- Media related to Siddhartha of Kundagrama at Wikimedia Commons
- Trishala

== Bibliography ==
- Dundas, Paul (2002) [1992]. The Jains (Second ed.). Routledge. ISBN 978-0-415-26605-5.
- Jain, Kailash Chand (1991). Lord Mahāvīra and His Times. Motilal Banarsidass. ISBN 978-81-208-0805-8.
- Shah, Umakant Premanand (1987), Jaina-Rupa Mandana: Jaina Iconography, vol. 1, India: Shakti Malik Abhinav Publications, ISBN 81-7017-208-X
- Sunavala, A.J. (1934), Adarsha Sadhu: An Ideal Monk. (First paperback edition, 2014 ed.), Cambridge University Press, ISBN 9781107623866
