= Jyeshtha =

Jyeshtha or Jyeshta may refer to:

- Jyeshtha (month), month of the Hindu calendar
- Jyestha (goddess), Hindu goddess of adversity and misfortune
- Jyeshtha (nakshatra), the 18th nakshatra (lunar mansion) in Hindu astronomy and Vedic astrology

== See also ==
- Jyeṣṭhāryā, 9th century queen regnant in Cambodia
- Jyeṣṭhadeva (1500–1575), Indian scientist and astronomer-mathematician
- Jyeshtharaj Joshi, Indian chemical engineer and nuclear scientist
- Jyeshthoputro, a 2019 Indian Bengali-language film
