= Nāya =

Republican tribe in Iron Age India

Nāya Republic
- c. 7th-6th century BCE–c. 468 BCE
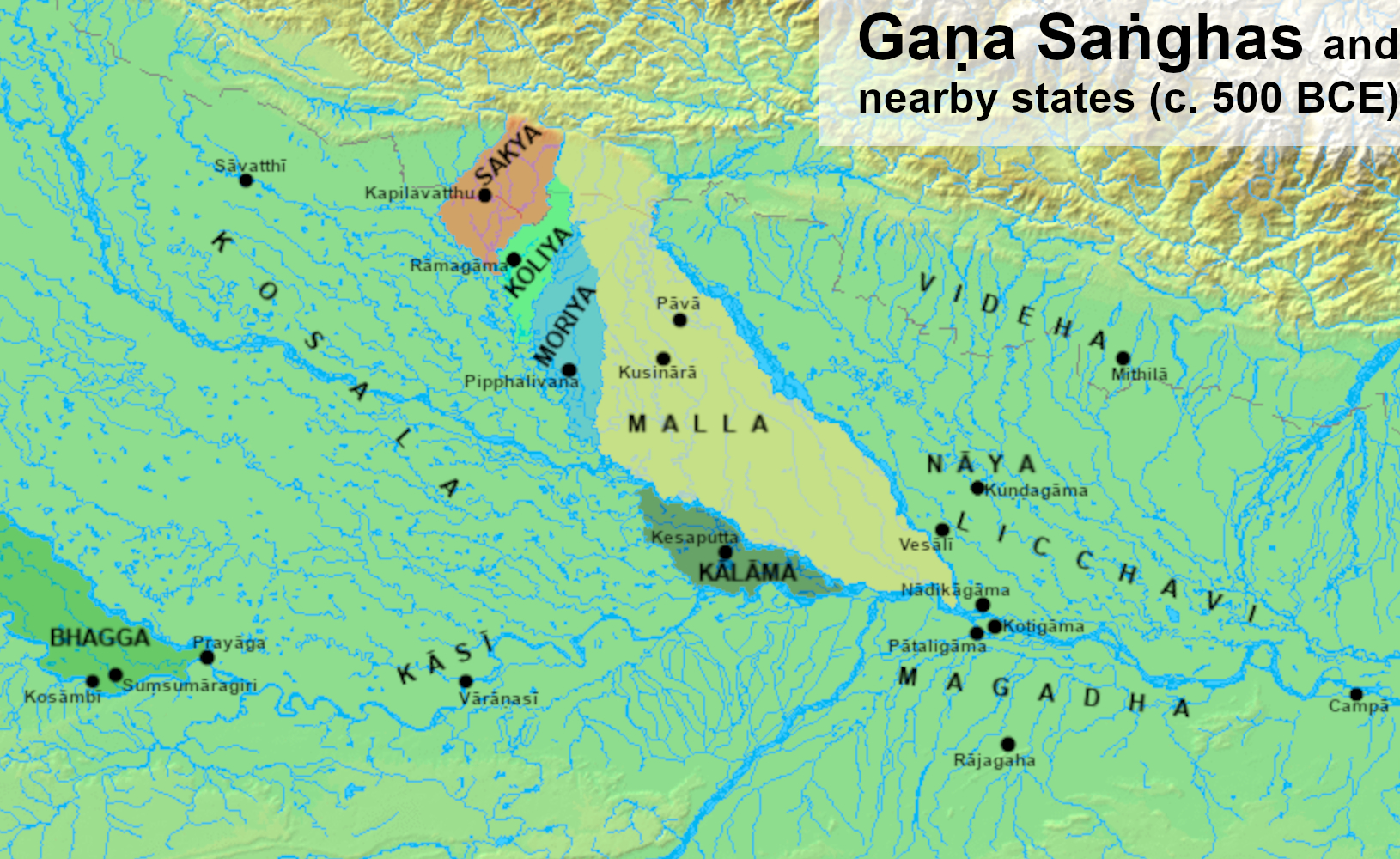
- Nāya among the Gaṇasaṅghas

- The Mahajanapadas in the post-Vedic period. Nāya was part of Vajji (the Vajjika League)
- Status: Republic of the Vajjika League
- Capital: Kuṇḍagāma
- Common languages: Prakrit
- Religion: Proto-Jainism
- Demonym: Nāyika
- Government: Aristocratic Republic
- Gaṇa Mukhya
- Legislature: Sabhā
- Historical era: Iron Age
  - Established: c. 7th-6th century BCE
  - Conquered by Ajātasattu of Magadha in 484–468 BCE: c. 468 BCE
Preceded by	Succeeded by
Mahā-Videha	Magadha
- Today part of: India

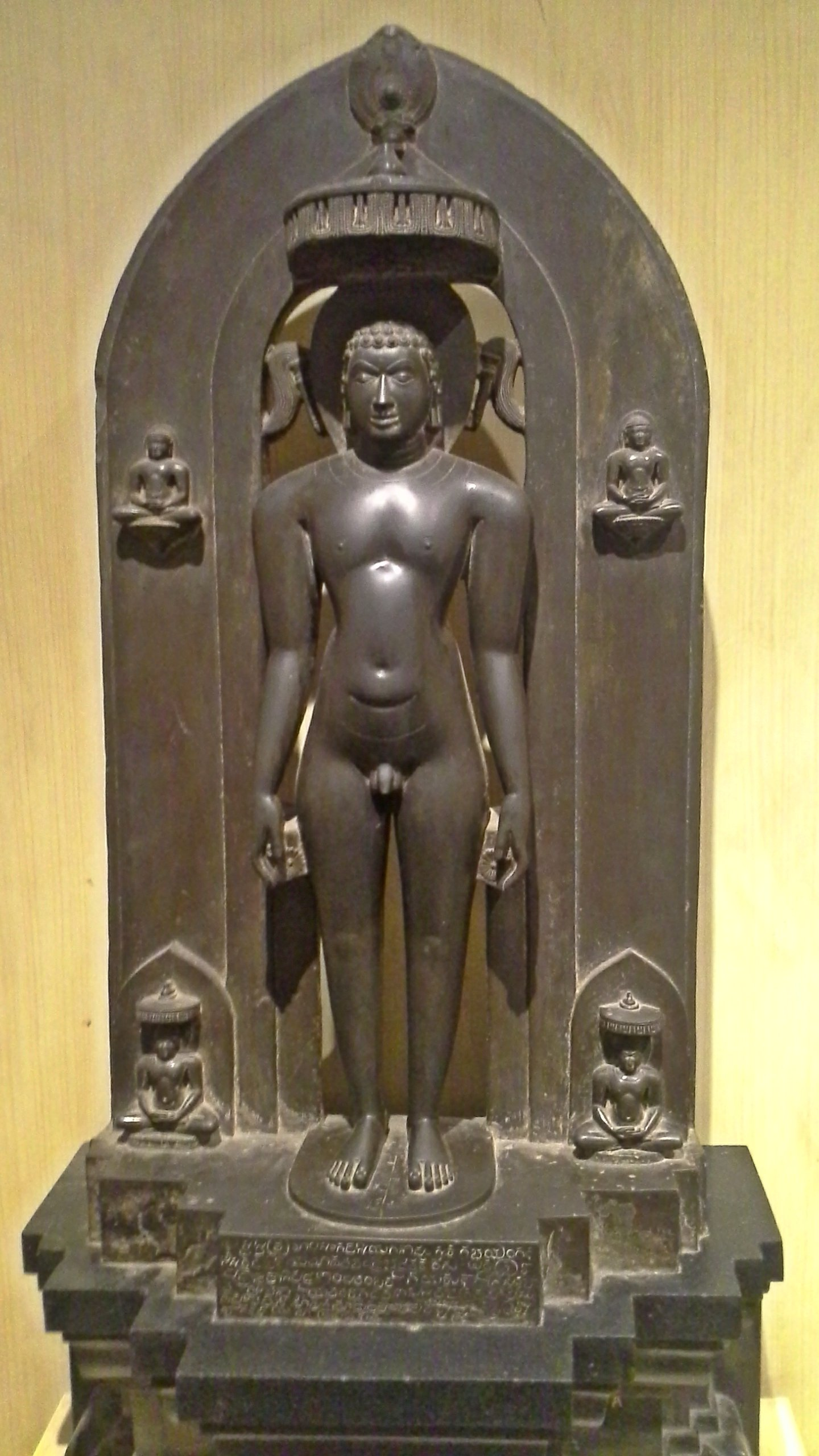
12th century CE sculpture of Mahavira who is often referred to as Nayaputta (son of the Nayas)

Nāya (Prākrit: 𑀦𑀸𑀬 Nāya; Pāli: Nāta; Sanskrit: Jñāta) was an ancient Indo-Aryan tribe of north-eastern South Asia (modern-day Bihar) whose existence is attested during the Iron Age. The population of Nāya, the Nāyikas, were organised into a gaṇasaṅgha (an aristocratic oligarchic republic), presently referred to as the Nāya Republic, which was part of the larger Vajjika League.

The existence of the Nāyikas is primarily known because of Mahāvīra who was born in this tribe. Mahāvīra himself was called Jñātaputra in Sanskrit and Nātaputta in Pāli, meaning "son of the Nāyikas."

== Location ==
The Nāyikas lived in the territory of the former kingdom of Mahā-Videha, whose borders were the Sadānirā river in the west, the Kauśikī river in the east, the Gaṅgā river in the south, and the Himālaya mountains in the north.

The Nāyikas themselves were principally located in a small area around a minor town called either Kuṇḍagāma (Kuṇḍagrāma in Sanskrit) or Kuṇḍapura in Pāli, which served as the Nāyika capital and was located somewhere close to the Licchavika and Vajjika capital of Vesālī to its northeast. Other Nāyika settlements included a northeastern suburb of Vesālī named Kollāga, as well as a cetiya named Dūīpalāsa that was nominally part of the Nāyikas' settlement at Kollāga but was physically located outside of it.

== Name ==
The name of Nāya is attested in Prākrit texts in the forms of Nāya, Nāyae, Nāe, and Nāī; in Pāli texts, they are called Nāta and Nātha; Sanskrit texts refer to them as Jñāta; and northern Buddhist texts contain the form Jñāti of the name.

The name Nāya is the Prākrit form of the Sanskrit word jñāta, meaning "kinsfolk," and which was later adopted as tribal name.

== History ==
The Nāyikas were a sub-group of the Videha tribe who in the eastern Gangetic plain in the Greater Magadha cultural region. In the 7th or 6th century BCE, the Licchavikas invaded the Vaidehas, replaced their monarchy by a republican system, and settled down in the southern part of the former Mahā-Videha kingdom. After this, the Nāyikas appear as an independent people with a republican state organisation, although they continued considering themselves as Vaidehas. Once the Licchavikas had established their own republican state, they founded the Vajjika League led by themselves, and which the Nāyikas, as well as the Vaidehas living in the north of the former Mahā-Videha kingdom, joined.

The Nāyikas were closely connected to the Licchavi republic, which had become the leading power in the territory of the former Mahā-Videha kingdom. The location of the Nāyikas close to the Vajjika capital of Vesālī gave them a geographical importance, and they were therefore one of the constituent republics of the Licchavi-led Vajjika League. As such, they held autonomy in matters of internal policy while their war and foreign policies were handled by the Vajjika Council, in which the Gaṇa Mukhya of the Nāyikas held a seat.

The important position of Nāya thanks to its geographical position and its Gaṇa Mukhya's membership in the Vajjika Council in turn gave the Nāyika Gaṇa Mukhya Siddhārtha enough importance that he married the princess Trisalā, who was the daughter of the Licchavika Gaṇa Mukhya Ceḍaga, whose daughter Cellanā was married to the king Bimbisāra of Magadha. These marriage connections provided Siddhārtha with significant political influence.

The Nāyikas from an early period followed a form of proto-Jainism that involved the worship of the 23rd Jain Tīrthaṅkara, Pārśva. The son of Siddhārta and Trisalā was the 24th Tirthankara, Mahāvīra, who absorbed the followers of Pārśva and whose teachings the Nāyikas accepted. After Mahāvīra's, death the Nāyikas acquired renown due to being the clan in which he was born.

After the death of the Buddha, the Licchavikas, the Mallakas, and the Sakyas claimed shares of his relics while the Vaidehas and the Nāyikas did not appear among the list of states claiming a share because they were dependencies of the Licchavikas without their own sovereignty, and therefore could not put forth their own claim while Licchavi could.

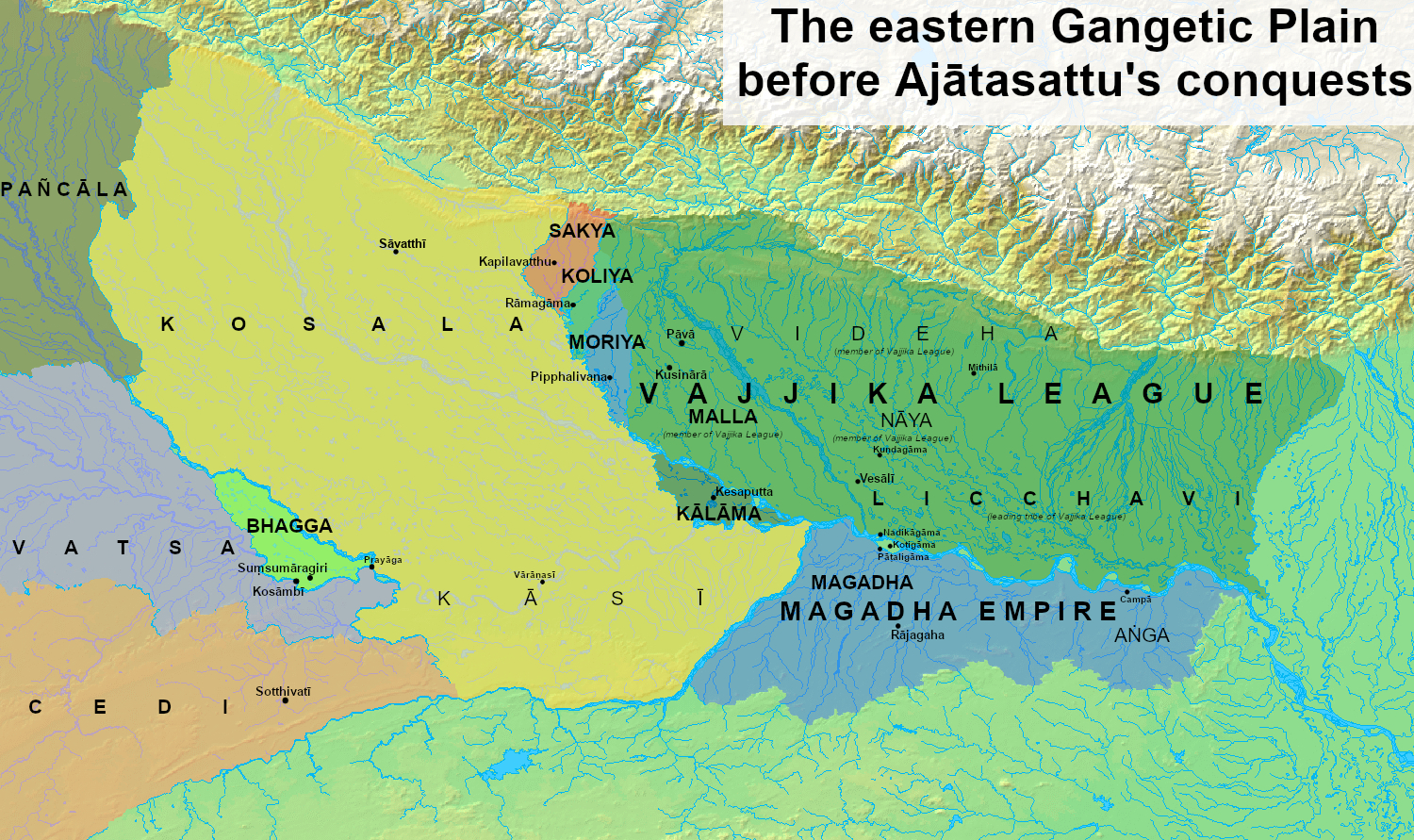
Map of the eastern Gangetic plain before Ajātasattu's conquests
(Malla shown within the Vajjika League)

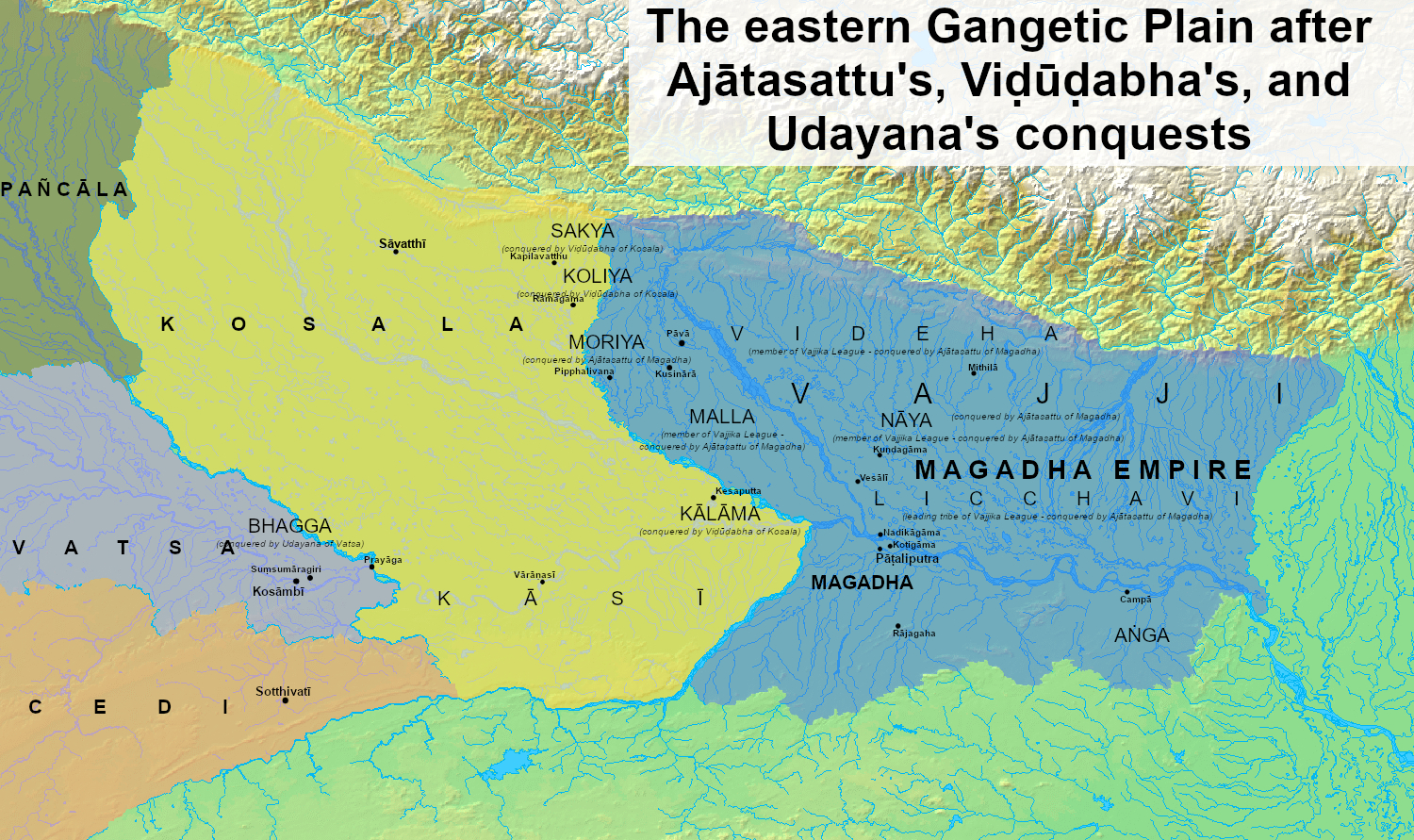
Map of the eastern Gangetic plain after Ajātasattu's conquest of the Vajjika League and of Moriya

=== Conquest by Magadha ===
The relations of the Licchavikas, who led the Vajjika League which the Nāyikas were part of, with their southern neighbour, the kingdom of Magadha, were initially good, and the wife of the Māgadhī king Bimbisāra was the Vesālia princess Vāsavī, who was the daughter of the Licchavika Nāyaka Sakala's son Siṃha. There were nevertheless occasional tensions between Licchavi and Magadha, such as the competition at the Mallaka capital of Kusinārā over acquiring the relics of the Buddha after his death.

In another case, the Licchavikas once invaded Māgadhī territory from across the Gaṅgā, and at some point the relations between Magadha and Licchavi permanently deteriorated as result of a grave offence committed by the Licchavikas towards the Māgadhī king Bimbisāra.

The hostilities between Licchavi and Magadha continued under the rule of Ajātasattu, who was Bimbisāra's son with another Licchavika princess, Vāsavī, after he had killed Bimbisāra and usurped the throne of Magadha. Eventually Licchavi supported a revolt against Ajātasattu by his younger step-brother and the governor of Aṅga, Vehalla, who was the son of Bimbisāra by another Licchavika wife of his, Cellanā, a daughter of Ceḍaga, who was the head of both the Licchavi republic and the Vajjika League; Bimbisāra had chosen Vehalla as his successor following Ajātasattu's falling out of his favour after the latter had been caught conspiring against him, and the Licchavikas had attempted to place Vehalla on the throne of Magadha after Ajātasattu's usurpation and had allowed Vehalla to use their capital Vesālī as base for his revolt. After the failure of this rebellion, Vehalla sought refuge at his grandfather's place in the Licchavika and Vajjika capital of Vesālī, following which Ajātasattu repeatedly attempted to negotiate with the Licchavikas-Vajjikas. After Ajātasattu's repeated negotiation attempts ended in failure, he declared war on the Vajjika League in 484 BCE.

Tensions between Licchavi and Magadha were exacerbated by the handling of the joint Māgadhī-Licchavika border post of Koṭigāma on the Gaṅgā by the Licchavika-led Vajjika League who would regularly collect all valuables from Koṭigāma and leave none to the Māgadhīs. Therefore Ajātasattu decided to destroy the Vajjika League in retaliation, but also because, as an ambitious empire-builder whose mother Vāsavī was Licchavika princess of Vaidehī descent, he was interested in the territory of the former Mahā-Videha kingdom which by then was part of the Vajjika League. Ajātasattu's hostility towards the Vajjika League was also the result of the differing forms of political organisation between Magadha and the Vajjika League, with the former being monarchical and the latter being republican, not unlike the opposition of the ancient Greek kingdom of Sparta to the democratic form of government in Athens, and the hostilities between the ancient Macedonian king Philip II to the Athenian and Theban republics.

As a member of the Vajjika League, the Nāya republic was also threatened by Ajātasattu, and it therefore fought on the side of the other confederate tribes of the league against Magadha. The military forces of the Vajjika League were initially too strong for Ajātasattu to be successful against them, and it required him having recourse to diplomacy and intrigues over the span of a decade to finally defeat the Vajjika League by 468 BCE and annex its territories, including Nāya, to the kingdom of Magadha. The Nāya republic ceased to be mentioned as an existing polity after the Māgadhī annexation of the Vajjika League.

== Social and political organisation ==
=== Republican institutions ===
Although later Jain texts depict Nāya as a powerful kingdom, the Nāyikas were in fact a small tribe organised into an aristocratic republic.

Similarly to their Licchavika, Vaideha, and Mallaka confederates within the Vajjika League, the Nāyikas were a kṣatriya tribe, and the heads of the Nāyika kṣatriya families were organised into an Assembly which met rarely, while the Assembly's smaller Council met more frequently than the assembly. The Assembly and the Council met in a santhāgāra, although the number of members of neither of these two bodies is known.

The chief of the Nāya clan was the Gaṇa Mukhya, who was the lifelong head of the Nāya republic. The Gaṇa Mukhya was more often referred to by the titles of rājā (meaning "ruler") or khattiya (that is, the Pāli form of kṣatriya), and whose status was equivalent to those of the much later tāluqdārs and zamīndārs. The head of the Nāyikas was assisted by the Assembly and the Council, and he held one of the nine non-Licchavika seats of the eighteen-member Vajjika Council.

=== The army ===
The Nāya republic did not possess a large standing army, although it contributed to the army of the Vajjika League during its war against Magadha.

=== The police ===
The Nāya republic possessed a small police force.

== See also ==
- Shakya
