= Sabhā =

Congregation in India

A sabhā or sabhaa in Ancient India was an assembly, congregation, or council. Personified as a deity, Sabhā is also the name of a daughter of Prajāpati in the Atharvaveda. In Epic Sanskrit, the term refers also to an assembly hall or council-chamber, and to a hostel, eating-house, or gambling-house. While the term Jansabhā refers to large public gathering.

The Mahābhārata, Book 2, has a Sabhā Parva or Sabhā episode, which describes the sabhā under King Yudhishthira. The word sabha originates from Sanskrit, meaning "assembly," "gathering," or "council". It also refers to the hall where such meetings take place and is found in modern Hindi and other Indian languages through a Sanskrit root.

A sabhā in south India, particularly in Tamil Nādu, popularly refers to a body or organization (goṣṭhi) involved in the promotion of fine arts such as Carnatic music, Bhāratanāṭyam, Drama among numerous other arts. These Sabhās are concentrated mostly in and around Mylapore in Chennai and are instrumental in ensuring that connoisseurs (known as Rasikās) from all parts of the world are treated with variety during the Music and Dance Season of Mārgazhi (December / January mostly).

== Types of sabhā ==
Historically, the sabha was a council of elders or prominent members, often advising the king (rajan). It was a decision-making body for governance, justice, and community affairs. The Samiti was another important assembly, it was a general assembly of the community, including commoners and elites, where major decisions like war, peace, or the selection of a leader were discussed. It is often described as a democratic or quasi-democratic institution. The Parishad was a council of the wise, experts in specific fields, philosophy, and law. It served as an advisory body to kings or as a forum for settling disputes on religious or legal matters. The goṣṭhi assembly was an informal and intellectual gathering, often associated with both entertainment and learned discussions on philosophy, theology, literature, poetry, games, and the arts.

== Modern usage ==
The term Sabha has also given rise to modern terms of Parliament of India, such as Lok Sabha (Lower House) and Rajya Sabha (Upper House), and the Indian states' Vidhan Sabha (Legislative Assembly).

The Federal Parliament of Nepal uses the word Sabha (Nepali: सभा) for Pratinidhi Sabha House of Representatives (Lower house), Rastriya Sabha National Assembly (Upper House), and Pradesh Sabha (Provincial Assemblies).

In Thailand, the Thai loan สภา sàpha can be found in names of particular institutions, like ราชบัณฑิตยสภา Ratchabandittayasapha for the Royal Society of Thailand (lit. "Sabha of the Raja's Pandits") and รัฐสภา Ratthasapha for the National Assembly (lit. "Sabha of the Rashtra [Nation]").

== See also ==
- Dharma Vardhiny Sabha
- Shreni
