= List of Ikshvaku dynasty kings in Hinduism =

Hindu mythological royal lineage

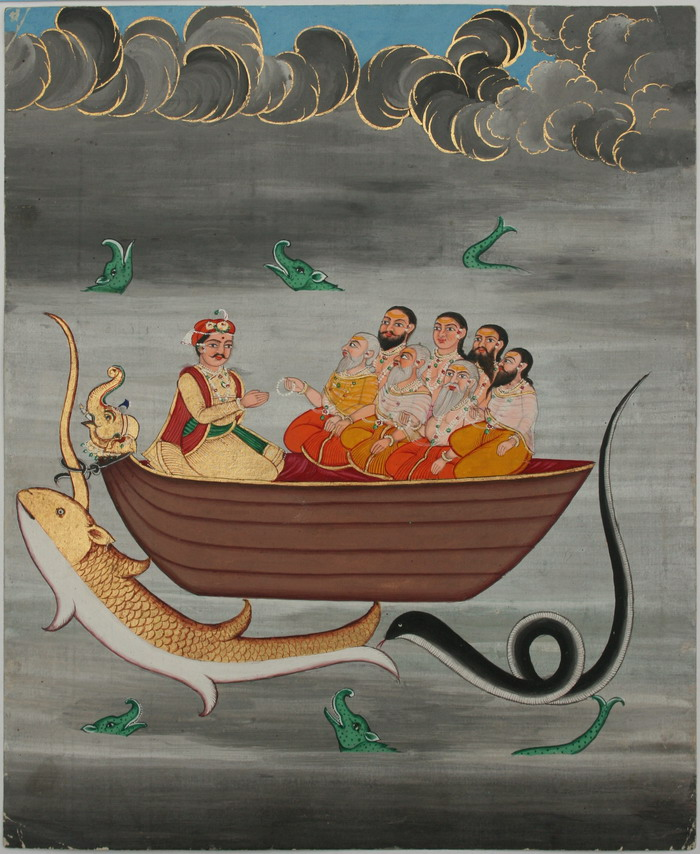
Manu and the Saptarishi on a boat carried by Matsya, saved from the Pralaya.

According to Hindu traditions, Shraddhadeva Manu (Sanskrit manuśraddhādeva) is the current Manu and the progenitor of the current manvantara. He is considered as the seventh of the fourteen Manus of the current kalpa (aeon).

Shraddhadeva Manu was the king of the Dravida kingdom before the Pralaya, the great flood. Forewarned about the flood by the Matsya avatar of Vishnu, he saved humanity by building a boat that carried his family and the saptarishi to safety. He is the son of Vivasvana and is therefore also known as Vaivasvata Manu, and his dynasty as the Suryavaṃśa. He is also called Satyavrata (always truthful). Ikshvaku (Sanskrit; ikṣvāku, from Sanskrit ikṣu; Pali: Okkāka), is one of the ten sons of Shraddhadeva Manu, and is credited to be the founder of the Ikshvaku Dynasty.

== Suryavamsha kings ==
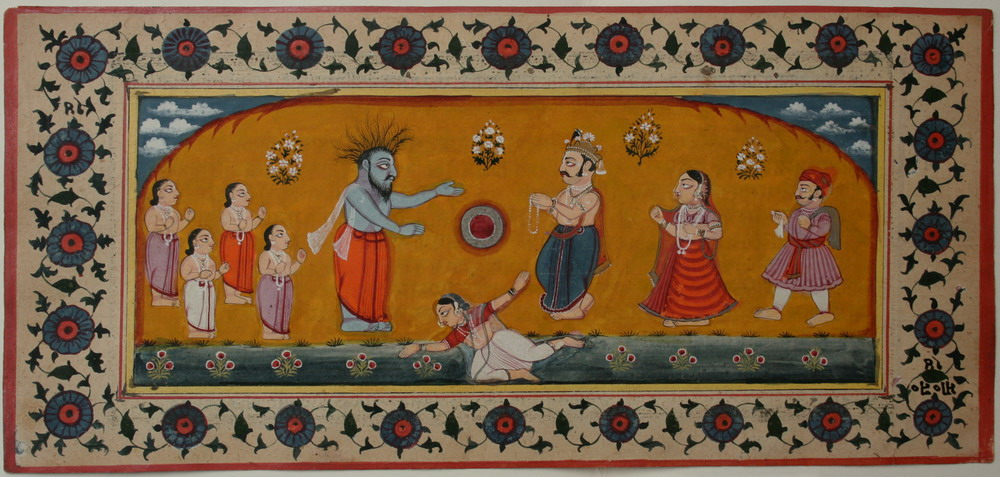
Folio from a Bhagavata Purana manuscript - The Sudarshana Chakra appearing before Emperor Ambarisha and Sage Durvasa

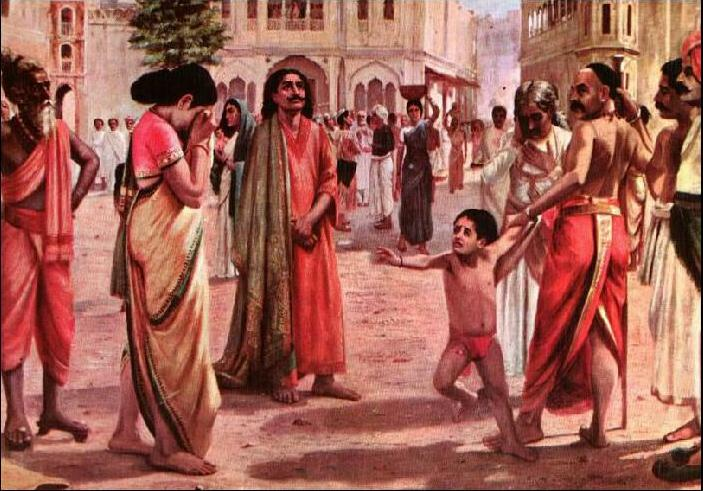
Harischandra loses his wealth, by Raja Ravi Varma

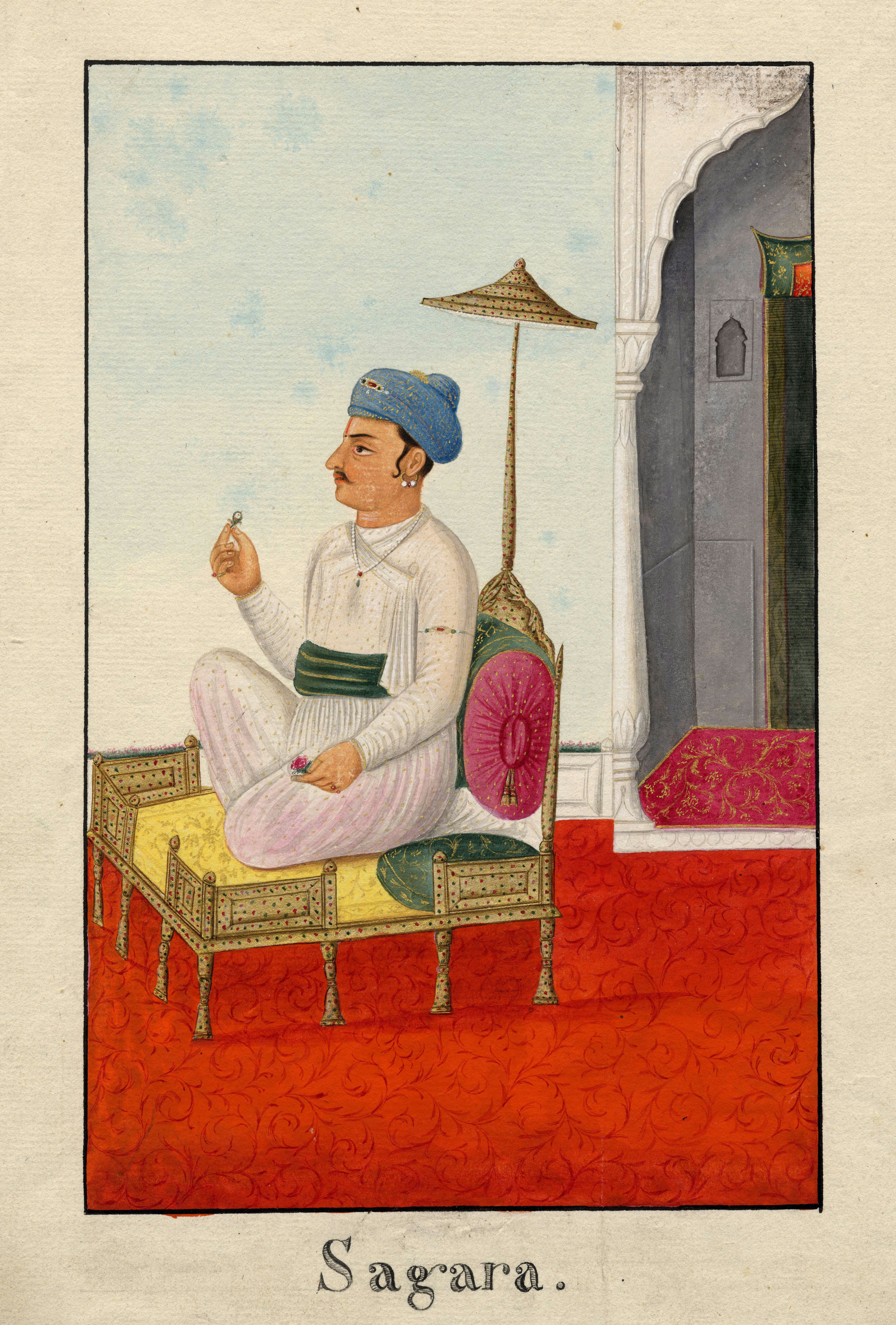
Sagara sitting upon his throne

The genealogy of the Ikshvaku dynasty to Rama is mentioned in the Ramayana in two lists. The only difference between the two lists is that, Kukshi is mentioned only in the second list. In the first list, Vikukshi is mentioned as the son of Ikshavaku. The descendants of Vikukshi are known as Vikauva.

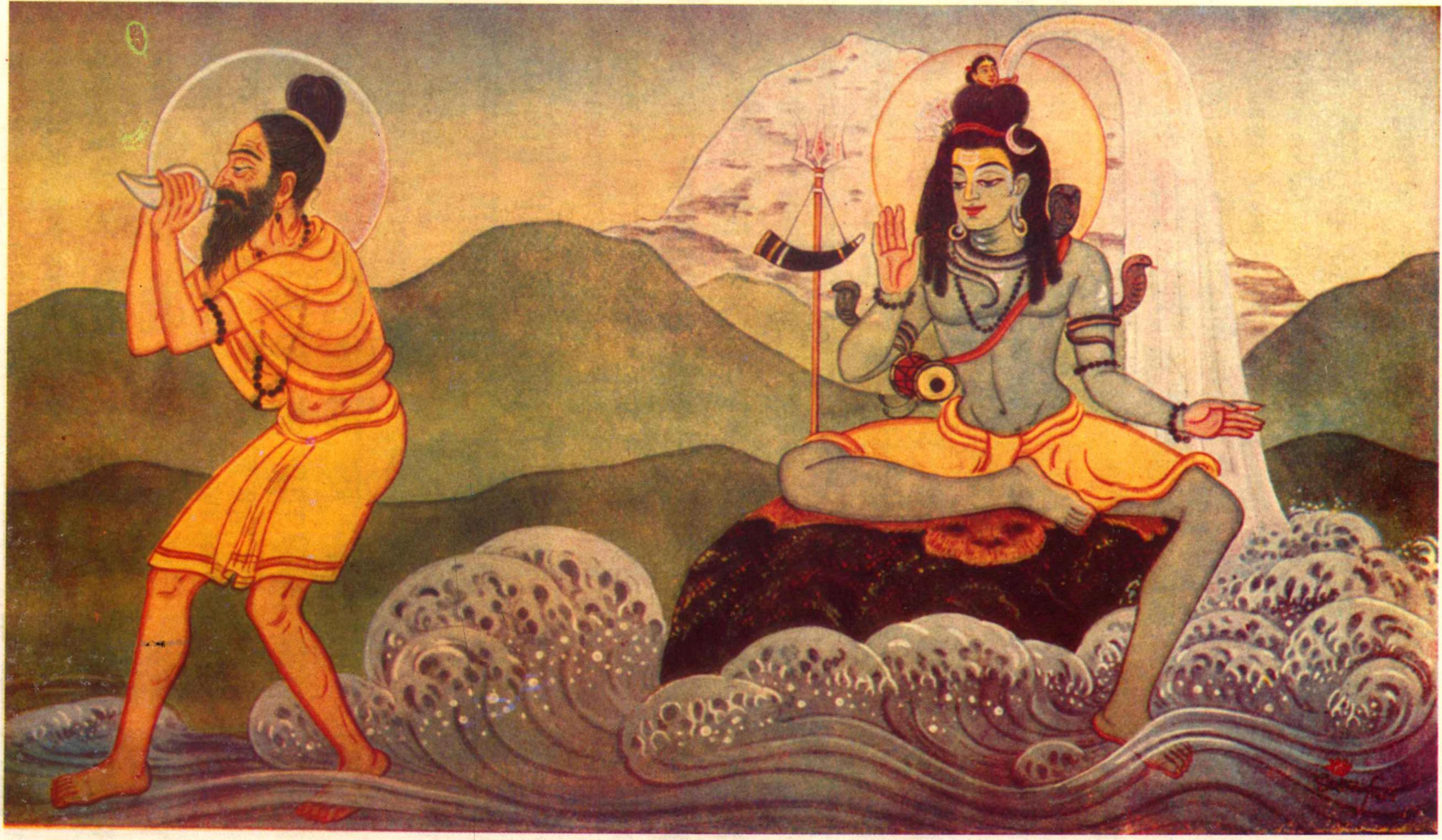
Shiva blesses Bhagiratha after allowing Ganga to descend from his matted hair upon the earth.

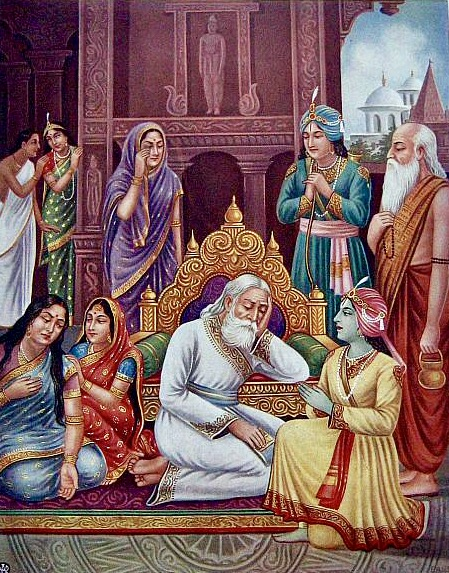
A bazaar art depicting Dasharatha grieving inconsolably at his obligation to banish Rama to the forest.

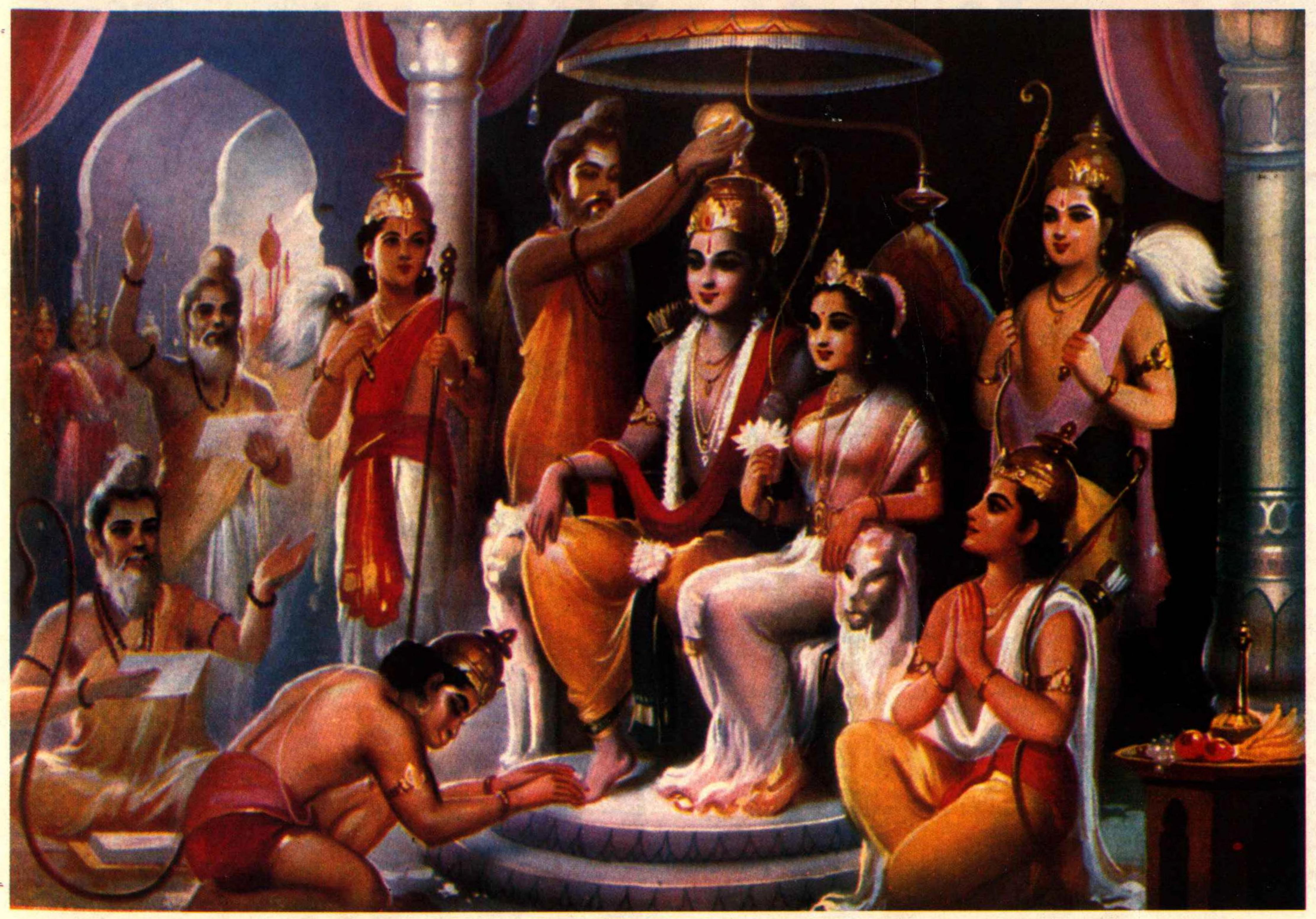
The coronation of Rama, with Sita by his side; flanked by Bharata and Shatrughna, with Lakshmana genuflecting and Hanuman prostrating before Rama.

1. Vaivasvata Manu
2. Ikshvaku
3. Vikukshi ( also known as Sasada)
4. Kakutstha (also known as Purañjaya)
5. Anenā or Suyodhan (Note: also depicted as son of Vikukshi)
6. Prthu
7. Vrsadashva (Vishtarashva)
8. Ārdra or Candra
9. Yuvanashva I
10. Shravasta
11. Mandhata I
12. Dhundumār (also known as Kuvalayāśva)
13. Dṛḍhāśva
14. Pramoda
15. Haryashva I
16. Nikumbha
17. Barhanāśva
18. Girikshita
19. Samhatashva (Amitāśva)
20. Krishashva or Akrutashva
21. Ranashva
22. Prasenajit I
23. Yuvanashva II
24. Mandhata II (Mandhātri)
25. Purukutsa
26. Trasadasyu
27. Sambhuta
28. Anaranya I (Vishnuvridha was his brother, from whom Vishnuvridha gotra brahmins originated)
29. Prshadashva or Trasdashva
30. Haryashva II or Rohidashva I
31. Vasuman
32. Tridhanva (Tridhatu)
33. Trivrsna
34. Tryaruna
35. Trishanku (also known as Satyavrata)
36. Vedhas (given in Aitreya Brahman)
37. Harishchandra
38. Rohitashva II
39. Harita
40. Chanchu
41. Sudeva (also known as Vijaya)
42. Ruruka
43. Vark
44. Bahuka
45. Asita
46. Sagara
47. Asmanjas
48. Amshuman
49. Dilipa I
50. Bhagiratha
51. Shrutasena
52. Nabhaga or Vrisagira
53. Ambarish
54. Shindhudvipa
55. Ayutayu
56. Rituparna
57. Sarvakarma
58. Sudasa
59. Kalmashapada ( also known as Mitrasaha)
60. Aśmaka
61. Mulaka
62. Shataratha
63. Vrdhasharma (also known as Ailavila)
64. Visvasaha I
65. Nighna ( his brother was Anamitra )
66. Dilipa II (also known as Khaṭvāṅga )
67. Dirghabahu
68. Raghu
69. Aja
70. Dasharatha
71. Bharata
72. Rama

The other sons of Dasharatha; Lakshmana and Shatrughna were said to be the kings of Karupada and Malla, and Madhupuri and Vidisha respectively.

== Suryavamsha kings after Rama ==
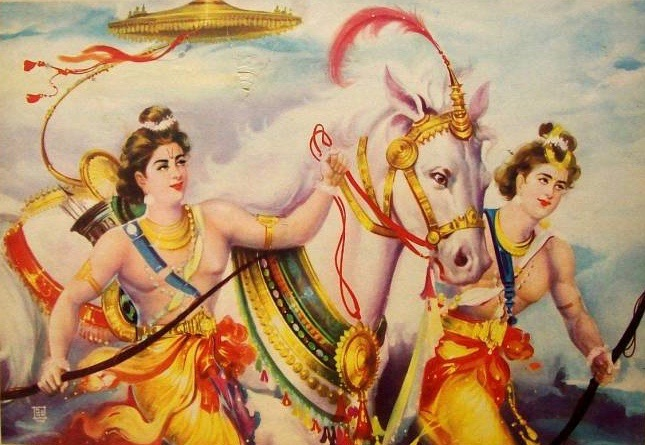
1910 depiction of Lava and Kusha, the twin sons of Rama and Sita, capturing the sacrificial horse of his ashvamedha yajna.

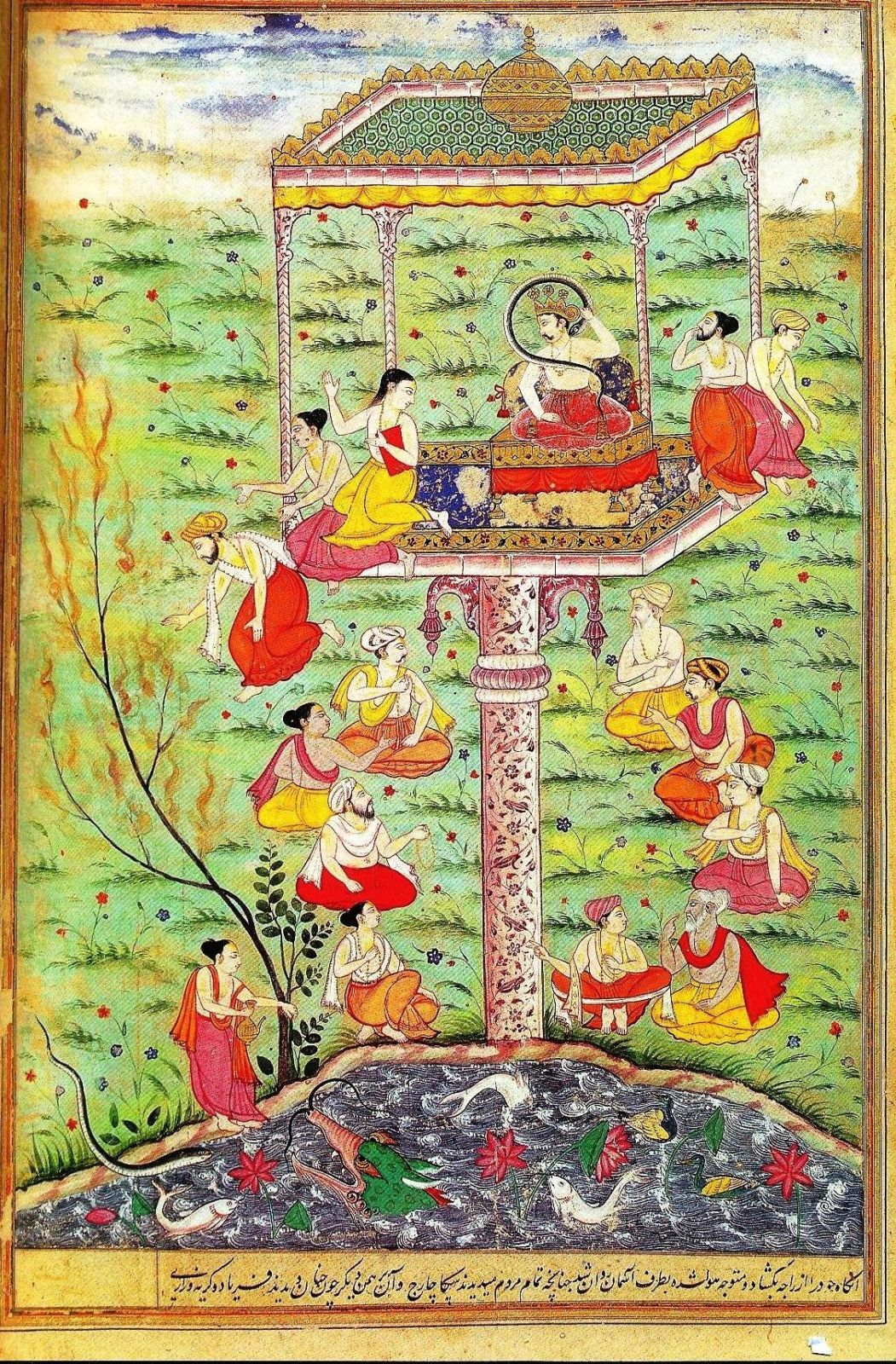
Emperor Parikshit of the Kurus, getting bitten by the Nāga King Takshaka, who is said to be a member of the Ikshvaku clan.

Rama and his brothers were succeeded by their respective sons; Kusha had inherited South Kosala and Lava had inherited North Kosala, while Bharata's children, Taksha and Pushkara, had inherited Takshashila and Pushkalavati respectively. Lakshmana's children, Angada and Chandraketu, had inherited Karupada and Malla respectively, and Shatrughna's children, Subahu and Shatrughati had inherited Madhupuri and Vidisha respectively.

The Puranas provide a genealogical list from Kusha to Brihadbala, who was killed by Abhimanyu in the Kurukshetra War. This list is corroborated by the Raghuvamsha till Agnivarna.

1. Kusha
2. Atithi
3. Nishadha
4. Nala
5. Nabhas
6. Paundrika
7. Kshemadhanva
8. Devanika
9. Ahinagu
10. Sahasrasva
11. Chandravaloka
12. Tarapida
13. Chandragiri
14. Banuchandra
15. Srutayu
16. Pariyatra
17. Dala ( according to Mahabharata, Sala and Bala were his brothers )
18. Uluka
19. Vajranabha
20. Sankhana
21. Vyusitasva
22. Visvasaha II
23. Atnar
24. Hiranyanabha Kausalya
25. Pusya
26. Dhruvasandhi
27. Sudarsana
28. Agnivarna
29. Sighra
30. Maru
31. Parsusruta
32. Susandhi
33. Amarsa
34. Visrutvana
35. Brihadbala

== Suryavamsha kings after Mahabharata ==
The Puranas also provide the list of the kings from Brihadbala to the last ruler Sumitra. But these lists mention Shakya as an individual, and incorporate the names of Shakya, Shuddodhana, Siddhartha (Gautama Buddha), and Rahula between Sanjaya and Prasenajit. The names of the kings are:

Successors of Brihadbala-

1. Brihatkshaya (or Bruhadrunama)
2. Urukriya (or Gurukshepa)
3. Vatsavyuha
4. Prativyoma
5. Bhanu
6. Divakara (or Divaka)
7. Virasahadeva
8. Brihadashva II
9. Bhanuratha (or Bhanumana)
10. Pratitashva
11. Supratika
12. Marudeva
13. Sunakshatra
14. Pushkara (or Kinnara)
15. Antariksha
16. Suvarna (or Sutapa)
17. Sumitra (or Amitrajit)
18. Brihadraja (Okkaka)
19. Rudraksha

Descendants through the Shakya lineage-

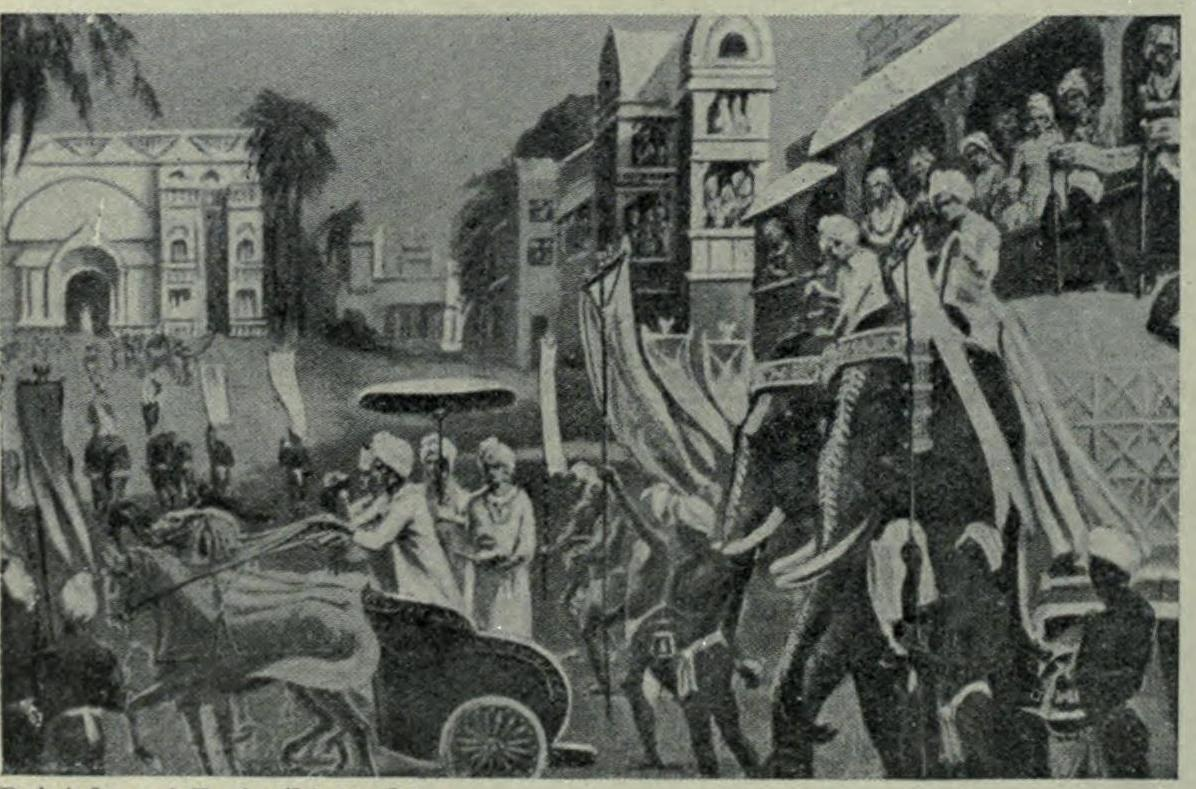
Pictorial representation of King Pasenadi of Kosala (Prasenajit) paying a visit to Siddhartha Gautama, from "Hutchinson's Story of the Nations".

1. Kritanjaya (Sivisamjaya)
2. Ranajjaya (Sihassara)
3. Jayasena (Mahakoshala or Sanjaya)
4. Sihahanu (Shakya)
5. Śuddhodana
6. Siddhartha Shakya (Gautama Buddha)
7. Rāhula

Later Ikshvakus, of the original lineage and rulers of Kosala-

1. Sanjaya Mahākosala
2. Prasenajit
3. Viḍūḍabha
4. Kshudraka (or Kuntala)
5. Ranaka (or Kulaka)
6. Suratha
7. Sumitra

According to Bibek Debroy, King Sumitra claimed to be the last ruler of the Suryavamsha dynasty of Kosala, as he was defeated by Mahapadma Nanda of Magadha in 362 BCE. However, he was not killed, and fled to Rohtas, located in present-day Bihar, where his son Kurma had established his reign.

== See also ==
- Solar dynasty
- Lunar dynasty
- Vedic science
- History of India
- Puranic chronology
- History of Hinduism
- Puru and Yadu Dynasties
- List of Hindu empires and dynasties
