= Virūḍhaka =

Virūḍhaka or Virudhaka may refer to:

- Virūḍhaka (Heavenly King), one of the Four Heavenly Kings in the Buddhist pantheon
- Virudhaka (raja), king of Kasi-Kosala in ancient India
