= King Sumitra =

Sumitra

King of Kosala
- Reign: ? - 362 BCE
- Predecessor: Suratha
- Successor: Office abolished (Mahapadma Nanda's conquest)
- Dynasty: Solar dynasty
- Father: Suratha
- Religion: Hinduism

King Sumitra was the last ruler of Suryavamsha dynasty of Kosala kingdom. He was defeated by the emperor Mahapadma Nanda of Magadha in 362 or 345 BCE. However, he was not killed, and fled to Rohtas, located in present-day Bihar.
