= Kālāma =

Republican tribe in Iron-Age India

Kālāma Republic
- c. 7th century BCE–c. 5th-4th century BCE
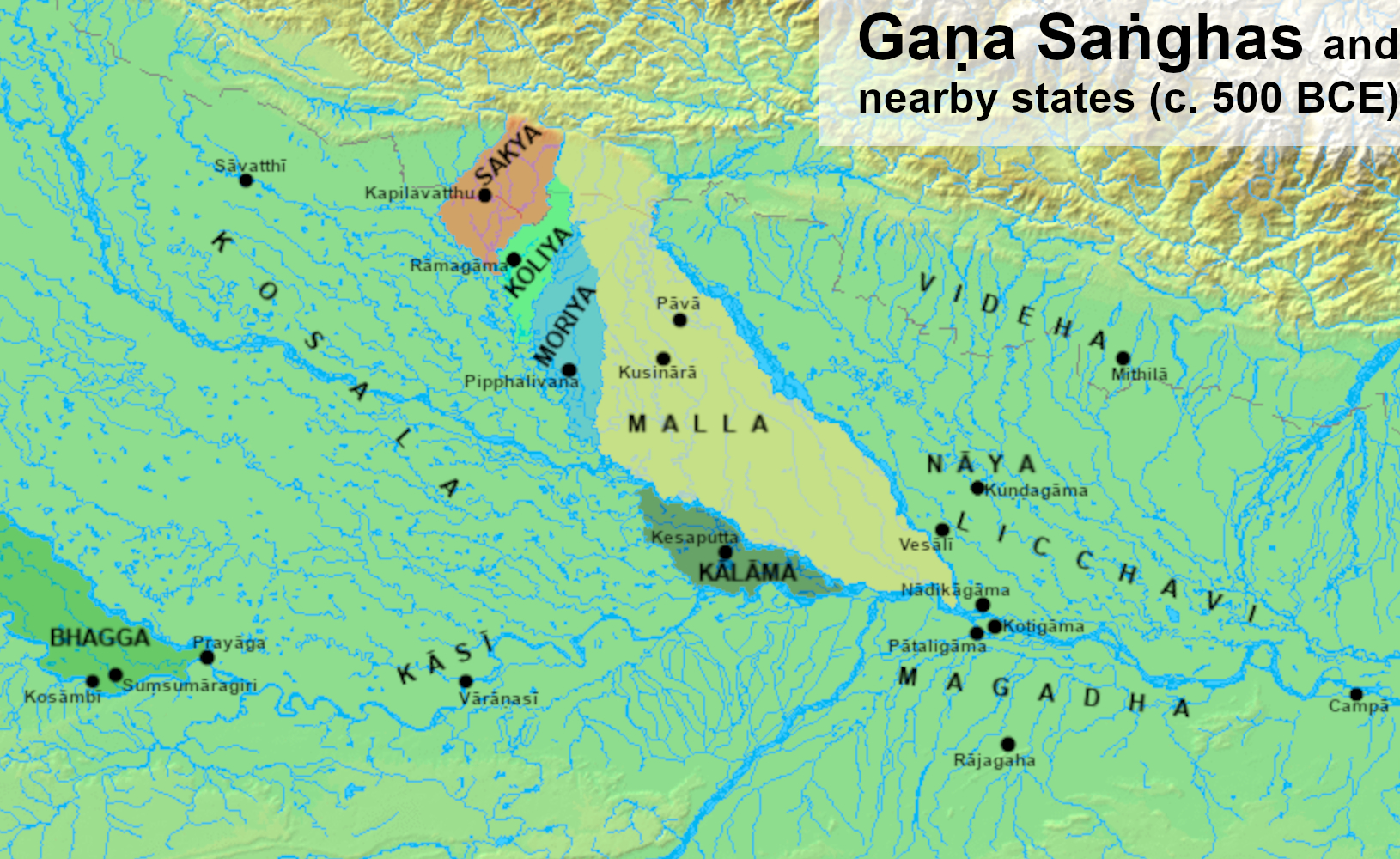
- Kālāma among the Gaṇasaṅghas

- The Mahajanapadas in the post-Vedic period. Kālāma was located close to the north of Magadha
- Capital: Kesaputta
- Common languages: Prakrit; Sanskrit
- Religion: Historical Vedic religion
- Government: Republic
- Rājā
- Historical era: Iron Age
  - Established: c. 7th century BCE
  - Conquered by Kosala: c. 5th-4th century BCE
Succeeded by
Kosala
- Today part of: India; Nepal

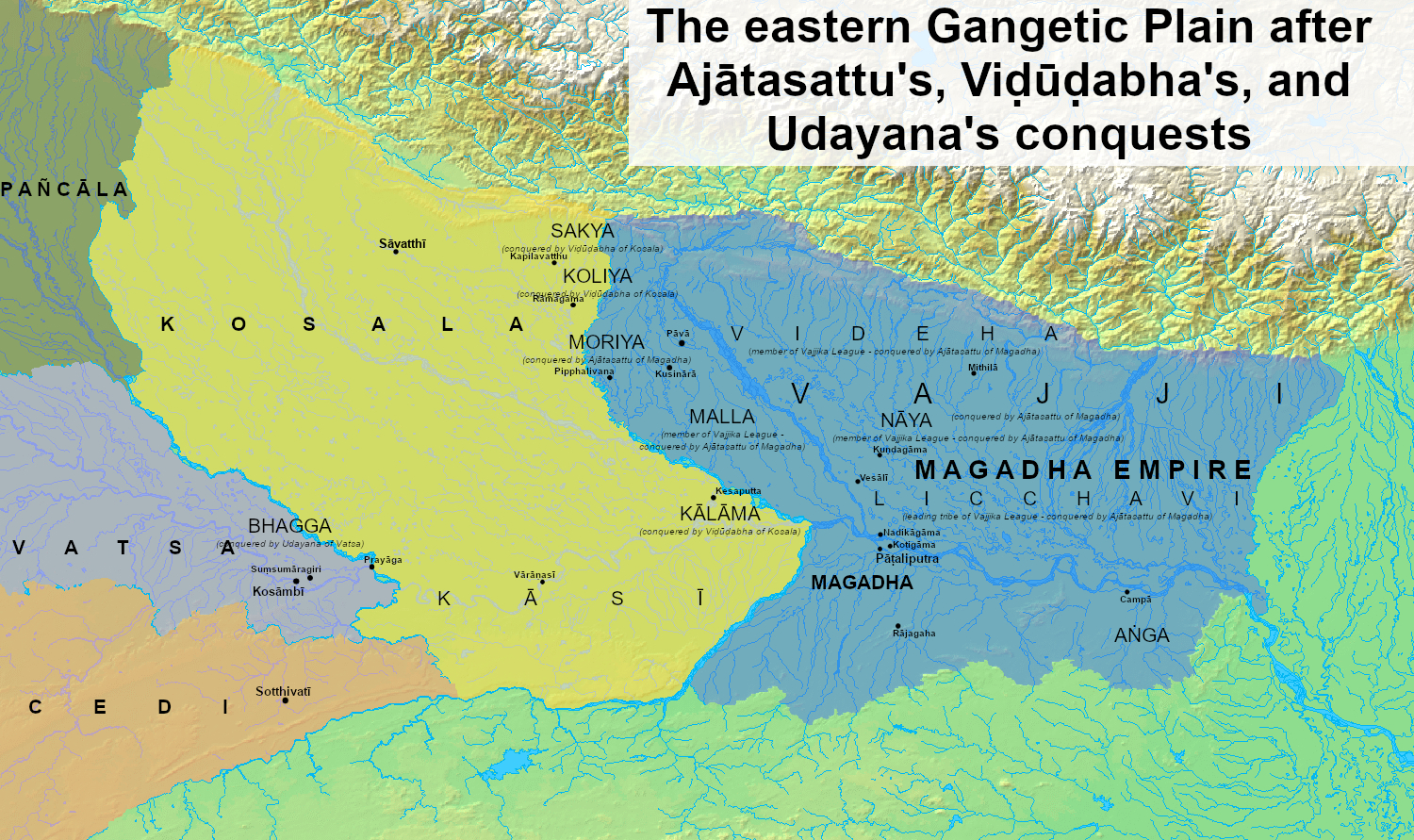
Map of the eastern Gangetic plain after Viḍūḍabha's conquest of Kālāma, Sakya and Koliya

Kālāma (Pāli: Kālāma) was an ancient Indo-Aryan tribe of north-eastern South Asia whose existence is attested during the Iron Age. The Kālāmas were organised into a gaṇasaṅgha (an aristocratic oligarchic republic), presently referred to as the Kālāma Republic.

== Location ==
The Kālāmas and their capital of Kesaputta were located on the Indo-Gangetic Plain between the river Sarayū and the Mallakas to the north, the Gaṅgā to the south, Vārāṇasī to the southwest, and the kingdom of Kosala to the west. The territory of the Kālāmas covered only the countryside around their town.

== Name ==
The origin of the name of the Kālāmas has not yet been determined.

The name of the Kālāma capital, Kesaputta originated from the Sanskrit word keśa, meaning "hair" or "mane." The name of Kesapputta was related to the name of the Keśin, who were a sub-tribe of the Pāñcāla tribe mentioned in the Śatapatha Brāhmaṇa.

== History ==
The Kālāmas were an Indo-Aryan tribe in the eastern Gangetic plain in the Greater Magadha cultural region. The Kālāmas originated as a branch of the Keśins, who were from the Pāñcāla, where they formed one of the three branches of the Pāñcāla tribe. From the Pāñcāla area, a branch of the Keśins founded Kesaputta, where they came to be known as the Kālāmas. Similarly to the other populations of the Greater Magadha cultural area, Kalams were initially not fully Brahmanised despite being an Indo-Aryan people, they later became Brahmanised when Kosala was Brahmanised.

By the time of the Buddha, the Kālāmas were a dependency of Kosala and its king Pasenadi, and the Buddha visited the Kālāmas at one point during his preaching. One of the Buddha's teachers, Āḷāra Kālāma, belonged to the Kālāma tribe, as did the Buddha's disciple Bharaṇḍu.

Pasenadi's son and successor Viḍūḍabha later annexed Kālāma into the Kosala kingdom. The Kālāmas did not request a share of the Buddha's relics after his death, possibly because they had lost their independence by then. Similarly, the Vaidehas and the Nāyikas did not appear among the list of states claiming a share because they were dependencies of the Licchavikas without their own sovereignty, and the Bhaggas who were a dependency of Vatsa also could not put forth their own claim, while the Licchavikas, the Mallakas, and the Sakyas could claim shares of the relics.

== Political and social organisation ==
=== Republican institutions ===
The Kālāma were a kṣatriya tribe organised into a gaṇasaṅgha (an aristocratic oligarchic republic).

==== Assembly ====
Like the other gaṇasaṅgha, the ruling body of the Kālāma republic was an Assembly of the kṣatriya elders who held the title of rājās (meaning "chiefs").

Like with other gaṇasaṅgha, the Assembly of the Kālāmas met in a santhāgāra located in their capital.

==== The Council ====
The Assembly met rarely, and the administration of the republic was instead in the hands of the Council, which was a smaller body of the Assembly composed of councillors selected from the membership of the Assembly. The Council met more often than the Assembly.

==== The Consul ====
The Kālāma Assembly elected for life a consul rājā. The consul rājā administered the republic with the assistance of the Assembly and Council.

=== Religion ===
Unlike the other gaṇasaṅgha, the Kālāmas appear to have been disinterested in Śramaṇa traditions such as Buddhism, which might have been an alternative reason why they did not demand a share of the relics of the Buddha. Since the Kālāmas were related to the Keśins, they might instead have been more inclined towards Brahmanism.

== Sources ==
- D. C. Sircar (1985). The Kānyakubja-Gauḍa Struggle. Asiatic Society. ISBN 9788192061580. OCLC 915112370.
- Sharma, J. P. (1968). Republics in Ancient India, C. 1500 B.C.-500 B.C. Leiden, Netherlands: E. J. Brill. ISBN 978-9-004-02015-3.
