= Kosala =

One of the Mahajanapadas

- c. 7th century BCE–c. 5th century BCE
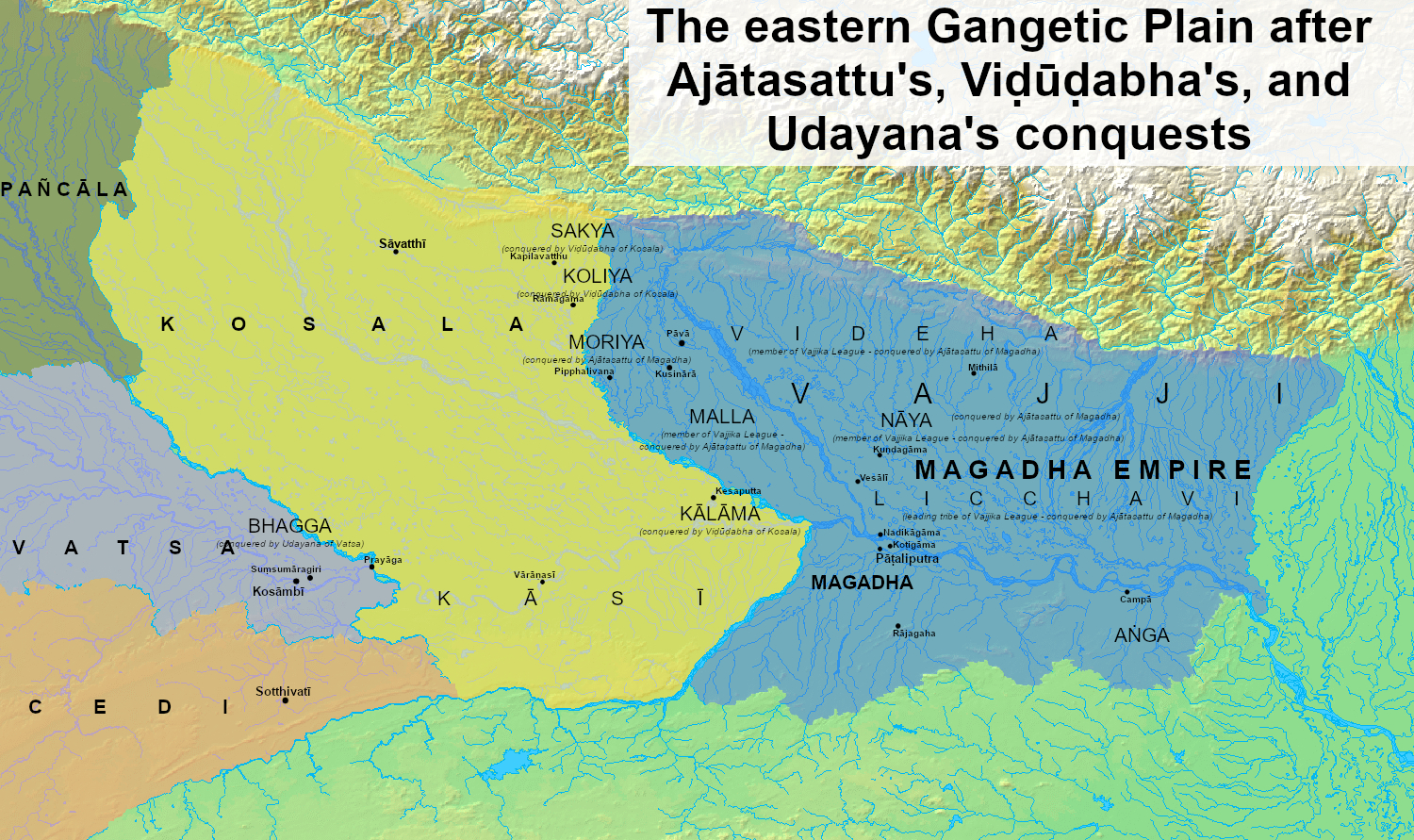
- Kosala and its neighboring kingdoms.

- Kosala and the other Mahajanapadas in the Post Vedic period.
- Capital: Ayodhya and Shravasti of Uttar Kosala
- Common languages: Sanskrit
- Religion: Historical Vedic religion Jainism; Buddhism
- Government: Monarchy
- King
  - ?: Ikshvaku (first)
  - c. 5th century BCE: Sumitra (last)
- Historical era: Iron Age
  - Established: c. 7th century BCE
  - Disestablished: c. 5th century BCE
Preceded by	Succeeded by
Black and red ware culture; Kashi	Magadha
- Today part of: India; Nepal

Kosala (IPA: [koːɕɐlɐ], Sanskrit: कोशल, sometimes referred to as Uttara Kosala (lit. 'Northern Kosala') was one of the Mahajanapadas of ancient India. It emerged as a small state during the Late Vedic period and became (along with Magadha) one of the earliest states to transition from a lineage-based society to a monarchy. By the 6th century BCE, it had consolidated into one of the four great powers of ancient northern India, along with Magadha, Vatsa, and Avanti.

Kosala belonged to the Northern Black Polished Ware culture (c. 700–300 BCE) and was culturally distinct from the Painted Grey Ware culture of the neighboring Kuru-Panchala region, following independent development toward urbanisation and the use of iron. The presence of the lineage of Ikshvaku—described as a raja in the Ṛgveda and an ancient hero in the Atharvaveda—to which Rama, Mahavira, and the Buddha are all thought to have belonged—characterized the Kosalan realm.

One of India's two great epics, Ramayana, is set in the "Kosala-Videha" realm in which the Kosalan prince Rama marries the Videhan princess Sita.

After a series of wars with neighbouring kingdoms, it was finally defeated and absorbed into the Magadha kingdom in the 5th century BCE. After the collapse of the Maurya Empire and before the expansion of the Kushan Empire, Kosala was ruled by the Deva dynasty, the Datta dynasty, and the Mitra dynasty.

== Location ==
=== Geography ===
Kosala was bounded by the Gomti River in the west, Sarpika River in the south, Sadanira in the east which separated it from Videha, and the Nepal Hills in the north. It encompassed the territories of the Shakyans, Mallakas, Koliyas, Kālāmas and Moriyas at its peak. It roughly corresponds to modern-day Awadh region in India.

=== Cities and towns ===
The Kosala region had three major cities, Ayodhya, Saketa and Shravasti, and a number of minor towns as Setavya, Ukattha, Dandakappa, Nalakapana and Pankadha. According to the Puranas and the Ramayana epic, Ayodhya was the capital of Kosala during the reign of Ikshvaku and his descendants. Shravasti is recorded as the capital of Kosala during the Mahajanapada period (6th–5th centuries BCE), but post-Maurya (2nd–1st centuries BCE) kings issued their coins from Ayodhya.

== Culture ==
Kosala belonged to the Northern Black Polished Ware culture (c. 700–300 BCE), which was preceded by the Black and red ware culture (c. 1450–1200 BCE until c. 700–500 BCE). The Central Gangetic Plain was the earliest area for rice cultivation in South Asia, and entered the Iron Age around 700 BCE. According to Geoffrey Samuel, following Tim Hopkins, the Central Gangetic Plain was culturally distinct from the Painted Grey Ware culture of the Vedic Aryans of Kuru-Pancala west of it, and saw an independent development toward urbanisation and the use of iron.

== Religion ==
Kosala was situated at the crossroads of Vedic heartland of Kuru-Panchala and Greater Magadhan culture. According to Alexander Wynne, Kosala-Videha culture was at the center of unorthodox Vedic traditions, ascetic and speculative traditions, possibly reaching back to the late Ṛgveda. Kosala-Videha culture is thought to be the home of the Śukla school of the Yajurveda.

According to Michael Witzel and Joel Brenton, the Kāṇva school of Vedic traditions (and in turn the first Upanishad, i.e., Bṛhadāraṇyaka Upaniṣad) was based in Kosala during the middle and late Vedic periods. Kosala had a significant presence of the muni tradition, which included Buddhists, Jains, Ajivikas, Naga, Yakṣa, and tree worshipers as well as Vedic munis. The muni tradition emphasized "practicing yoga, meditation, renunciation and wandering mendicancy", in contrast to the ṛṣis who "recited prayers, conducted homa, and led a householder lifestyle".

According to Samuel, there is "extensive iconographical evidence for a religion of fertility and auspiciousness". According to Hopkins, the region was marked by a "... world of female powers, natural transformation, sacred earth and sacred places, blood sacrifices, and ritualists who accepted pollution on behalf of their community".

=== Jainism ===
Kosala had a particularly strong connection with Jainism. Shravasti is often mentioned in Jaina sources. It is also called Chandrapuri or Chandrikapuri or Ārya Kṣetra, because Jaina texts state that two of their Tirthankaras were born here, namely Sambhavanatha (3rd of 24) and Chandraprabha (8th of 24). Shravasti is also known as the capital city of Kunala's kingdom.

Sambhavanatha is said to have had taken initiation, donated all his belongings, and broken his first fast in Shravasti after begging for alms from King Surendradatta. Munisuvrataswami, the 20th Tirthankara, visited Shravasti and initiated several members of the royal family. As per the Jaina text Jnatadharmakathah, Parshvanatha, the 23rd Tirthankara, also visited Shravasti and inspired several lay-followers to accept initiation.

Further, Shravasti is the place of the bitter arguments and meeting between Mahavira – the 24th Tirthankara, and Gosala Mankhaliputta – the founder of Ajivikas and a rival. According to the Jain texts, the Mahavira visited Shravasti many times and spent his tenth varsha monsoon season here before attaining omniscience. He was hosted by a wealthy merchant named Nandinipriya. Ancient Jain scholars such as Kapila, Maghavan and Keshi studied in Shravasti. At Shravasti, Jamāli, Mahavira's son-in-law, created the first of the eight heretical sects by opposing tenets of Jainism as taught by Mahavira himself. The eighth heretical sect, Digambara sect, was created by Sivabhuti at Rathavirapur. As described in the Jaina text Uttaradhyayana Sutra, the discussion between Keśiśramanācharya and Mahavira's first disciple, Gautama Swami, is said to have had taken place at Shravasti. This was the place where Upkeśa Gaccha was established by Keśiśramanācharya after he accepted Mahavira's conduct and became a white-clad monk along with all his disciples who were initially following Parshvanatha's conduct. Moreover, the Pattavali described in the Kalpa Sūtra, states the existence of "Śrāvastikā Śākhā", one of the four branches of the "Veṣavāṭikgaṇa" of the Jaina sangha. It had originated from Ācārya Kāmardhi, a disciple of Ācārya Suhastisuri, belonging to the beginning of the 3rd century BCE. Ācārya Jinaprabhasuri, in his Vividha Tirtha Kalpa confirms that a Jaina temple with an image of Sambhavanatha was renovated multiple times until it was finally completely desecrated during the reign of Alauddin Khilji.

=== Buddhism ===
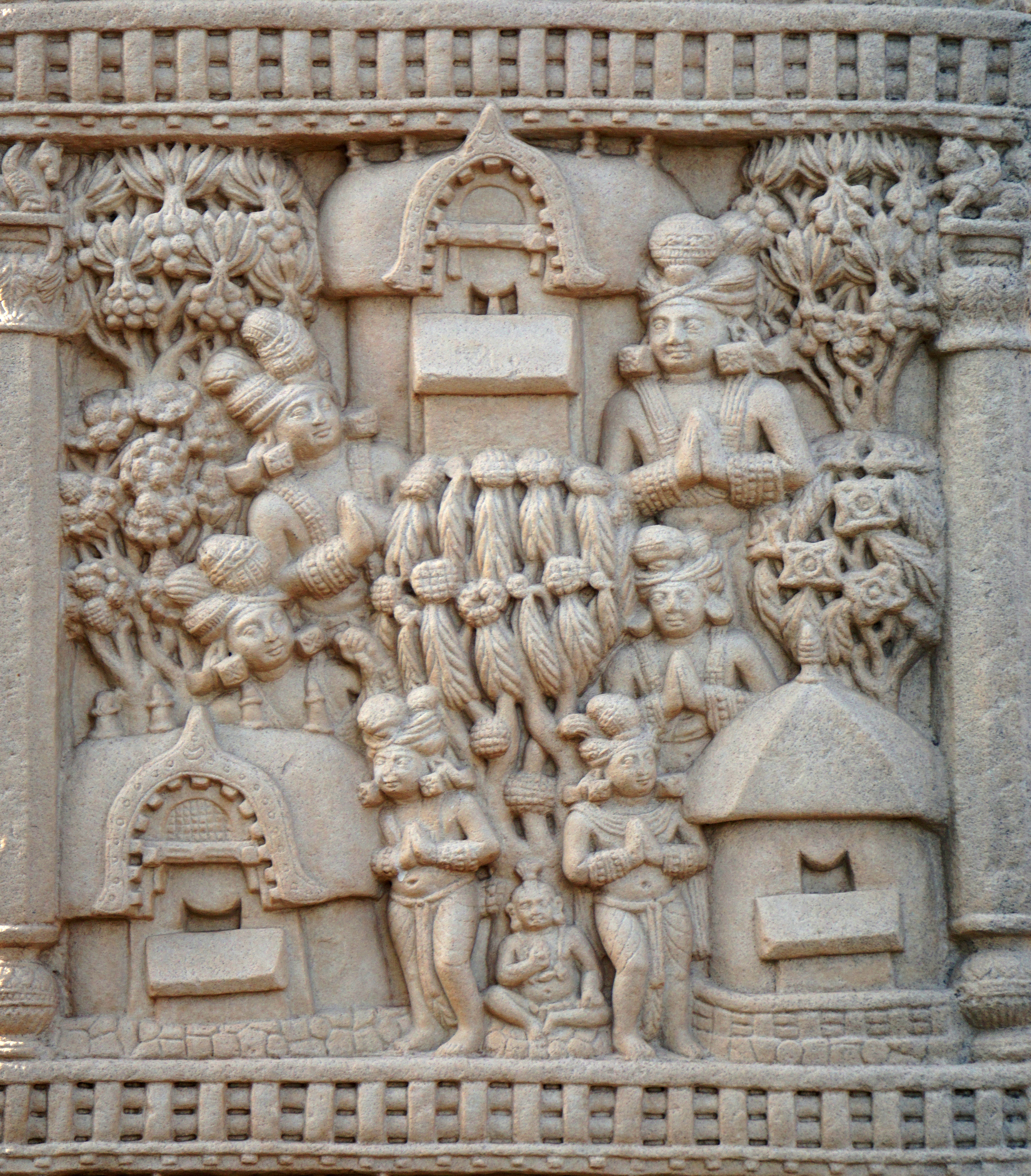
Jetavana of Sravasti showing the three preferred residences of the Buddha. Sanchi.

Kosala had a particularly strong connection to the Buddha's life. Buddha introduced himself to the king of Magadha in the Suttanipata as a Kosalan. In the Majjhima Nikāya too, king Prasenajit refers to Buddha as a Kosalan. He spent much of his time teaching in Śrāvastī, especially in the Jetavana monastery. According to Samuels, early Buddhism was not a protest against an already established Vedic-Brahmanical system, which developed in Kuru-Pancala realm, but an opposition against the growing influence of this Vedic-Brahmanical system, and the superior position granted to Brahmins in it.

=== Religious textual references ===
==== In Buddhist and Jain texts ====
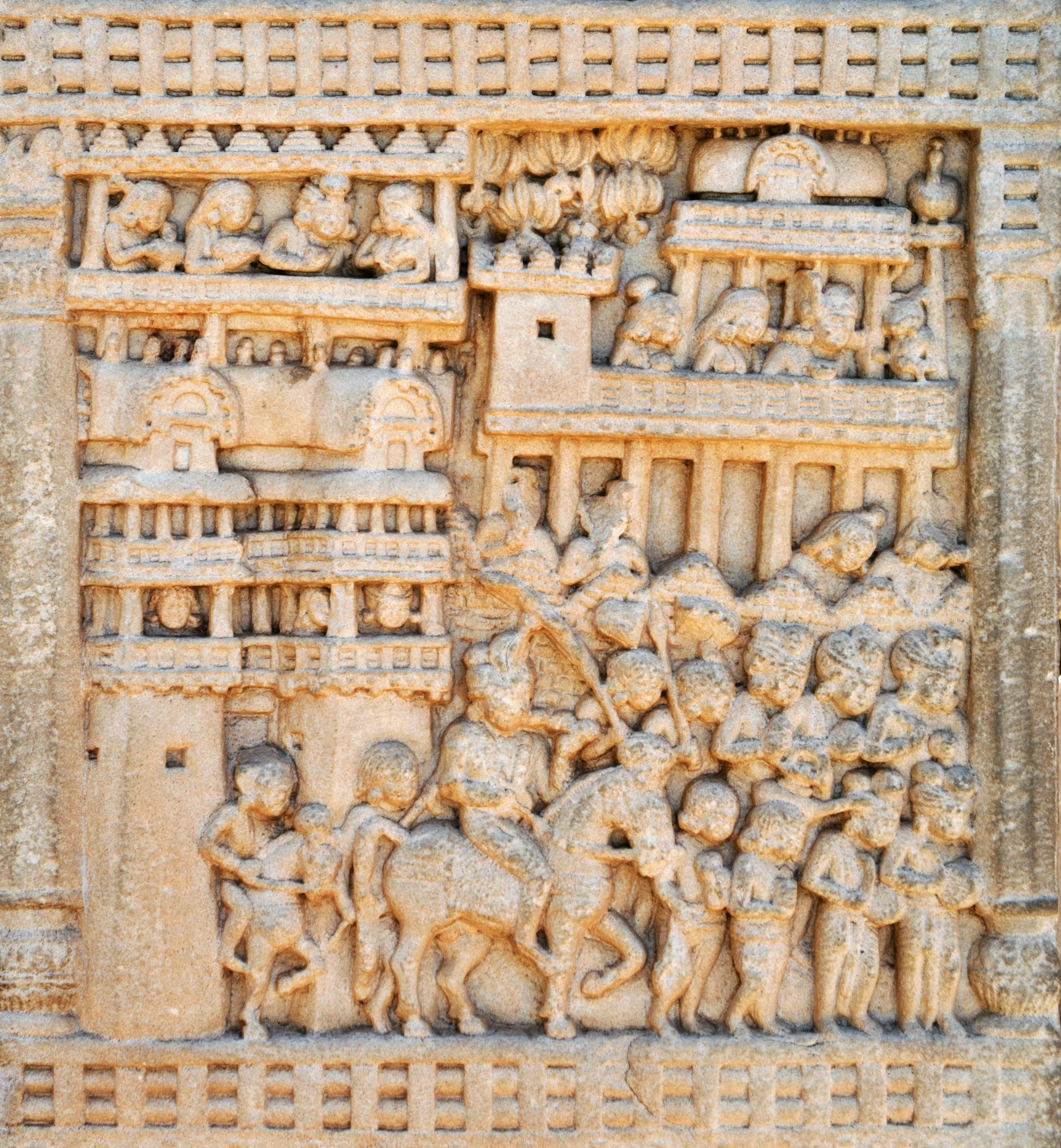
Procession of Prasenajit of Kosala leaving Sravasti to meet the Buddha, carved relief from Sanchi.

Mahavira, the 24th Tirthankara of Jainism taught in Kosala. A Buddhist text, the Majjhima Nikaya mentions Buddha as a Kosalan, which indicates that Kosala may have subjugated the Shakya clan, which the Buddha is traditionally believed to have belonged to.

==== In Vedic Literature ====
Kosala

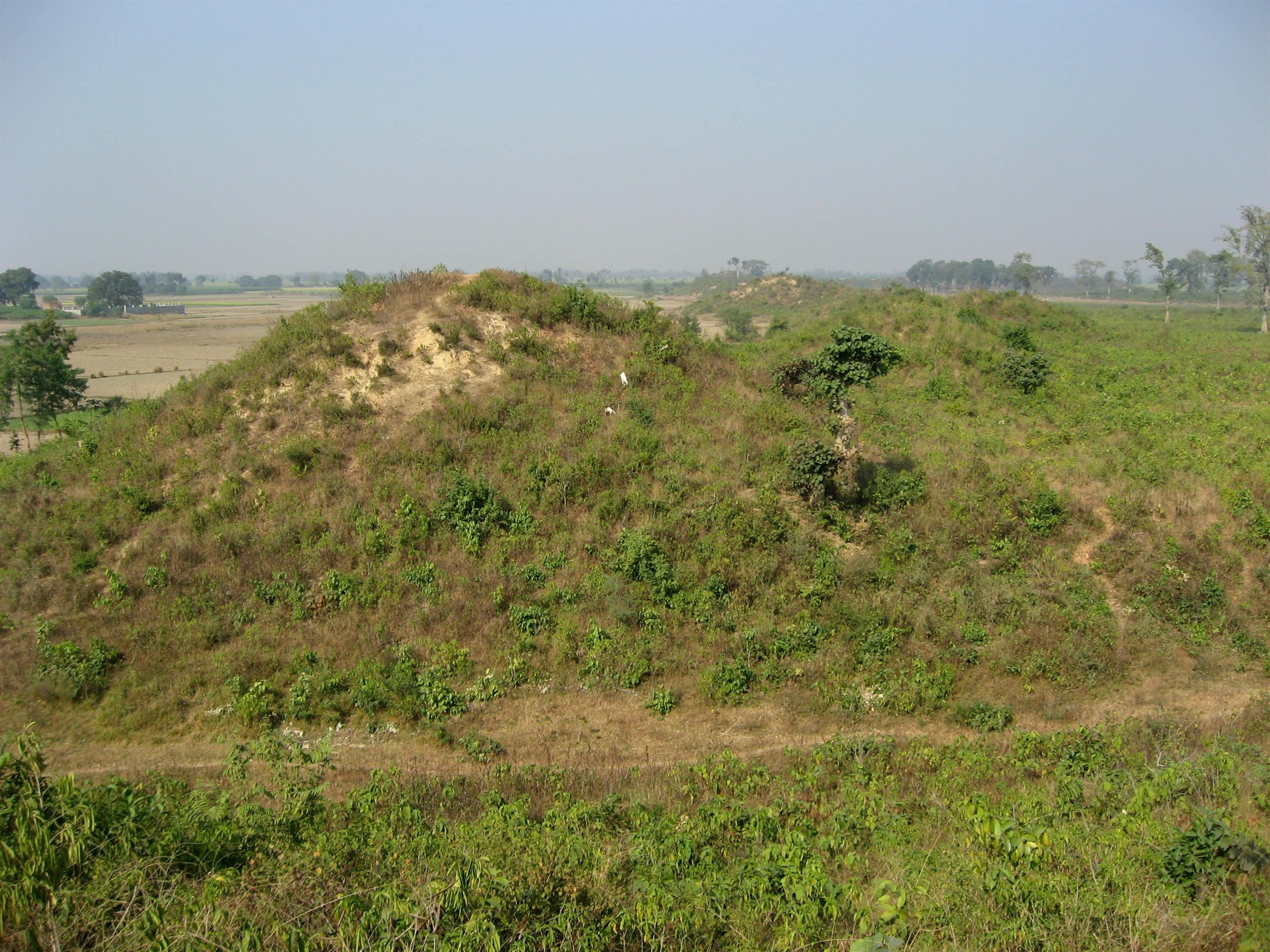
The ruins of the city walls of Shravasti, the capital of the Kosala kingdom.

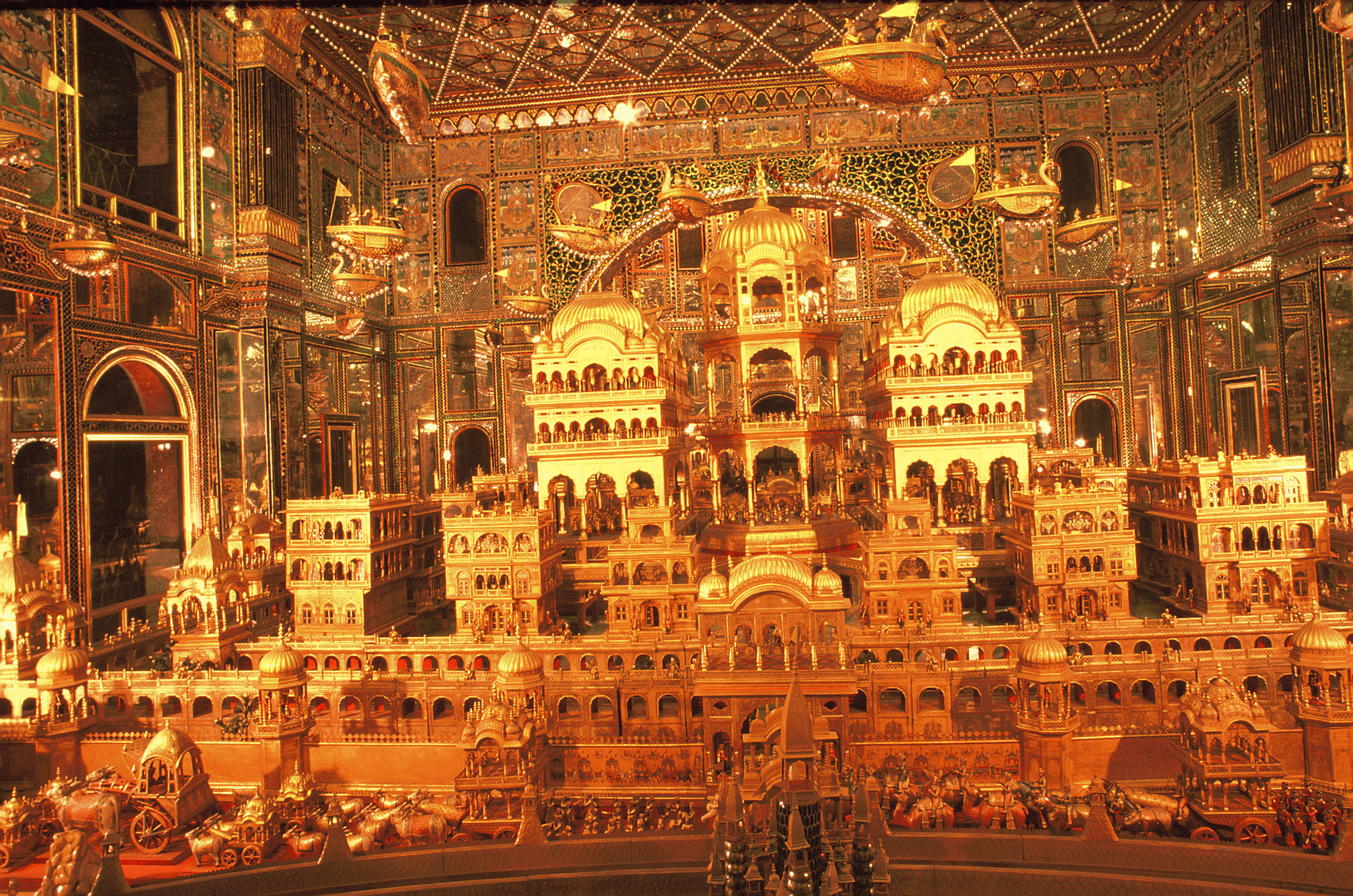
Gold carving depiction of the legendary Ayodhya at the Ajmer Jain temple.

Kosala is not mentioned in the early Vedic literature, but appears as a region in the later Vedic texts of the Shatapatha Brahmana (7th–6th centuries BCE, final version 300 BCE) and the Kalpasutras (6th-century BCE).

==== In Puranas ====
In the Ramayana, Mahabharata and the Puranas the ruling family of the Kosala kingdom was the Ikshvaku dynasty, which was descended from king Ikshvaku. The Puranas give lists of kings of the Ikshvaku dynasty from Ikshvaku to Prasenajit (Pali: Pasenadi). According to the Ramayana, Rama ruled the Kosala kingdom from his capital, Ayodhya.

== History ==
=== Pre-Mauryan ===
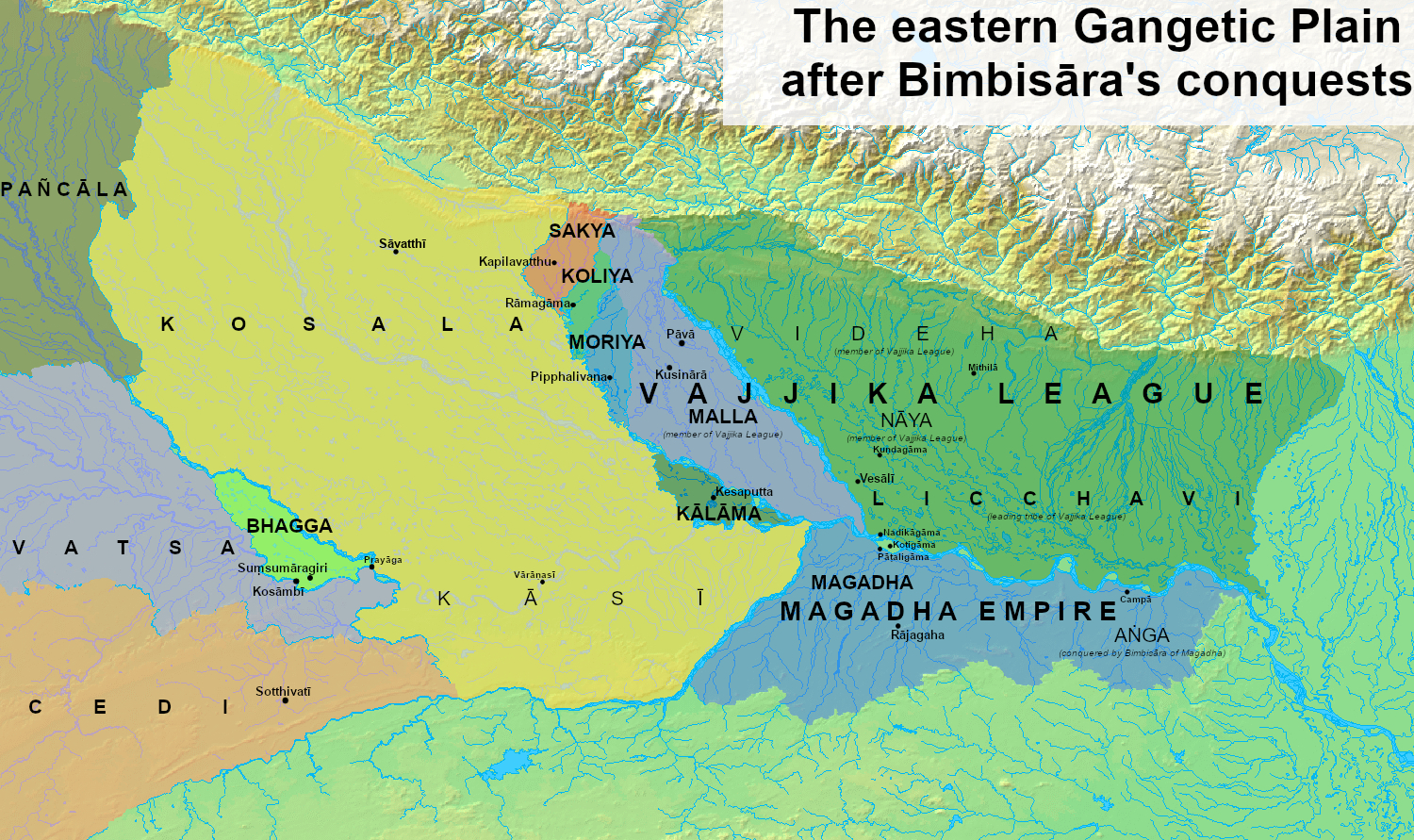
Map of the eastern Gangetic plain before Viḍūḍabha's conquests

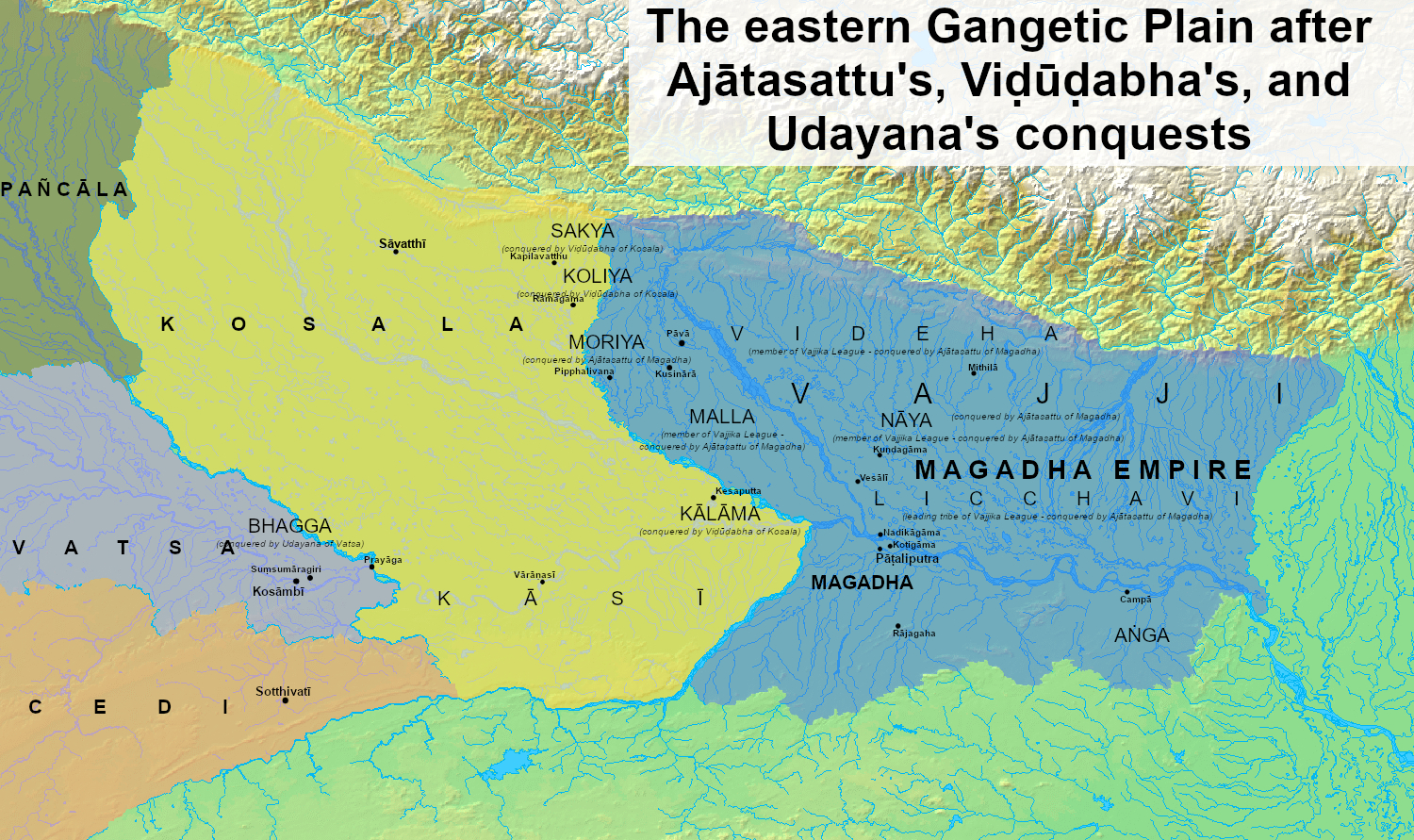
Map of the eastern Gangetic plain after Viḍūḍabha's conquest of Kālāma, Sakya and Koliya

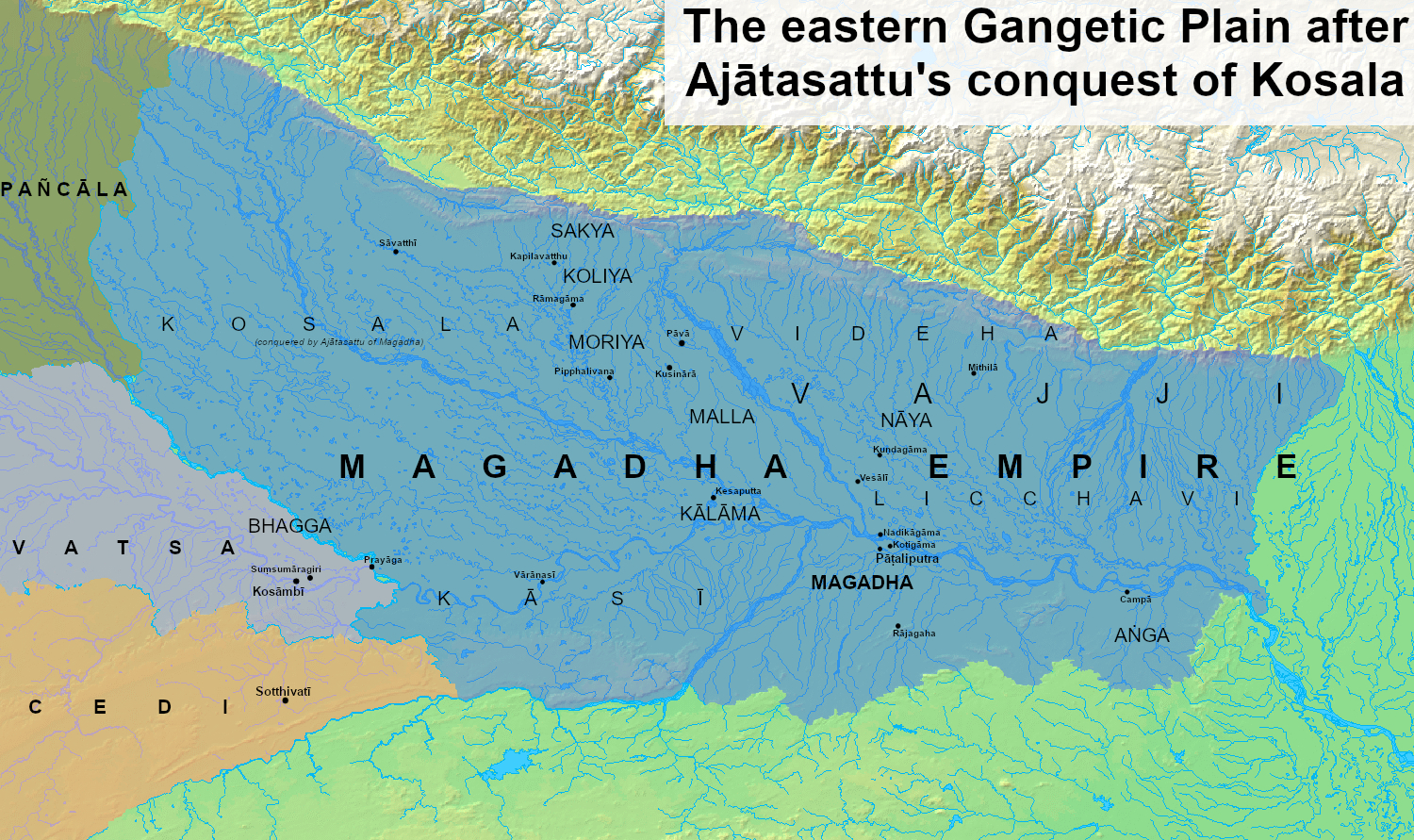
The eastern Gangetic plain after Viḍūḍabha's defeat by Ajātasattu of Magadha

Koshala's first capital of Shravasti was barely settled by the 6th century BCE, but there is the beginnings of a mud fort. By 500 BCE, Vedic people had spread to Koshala.

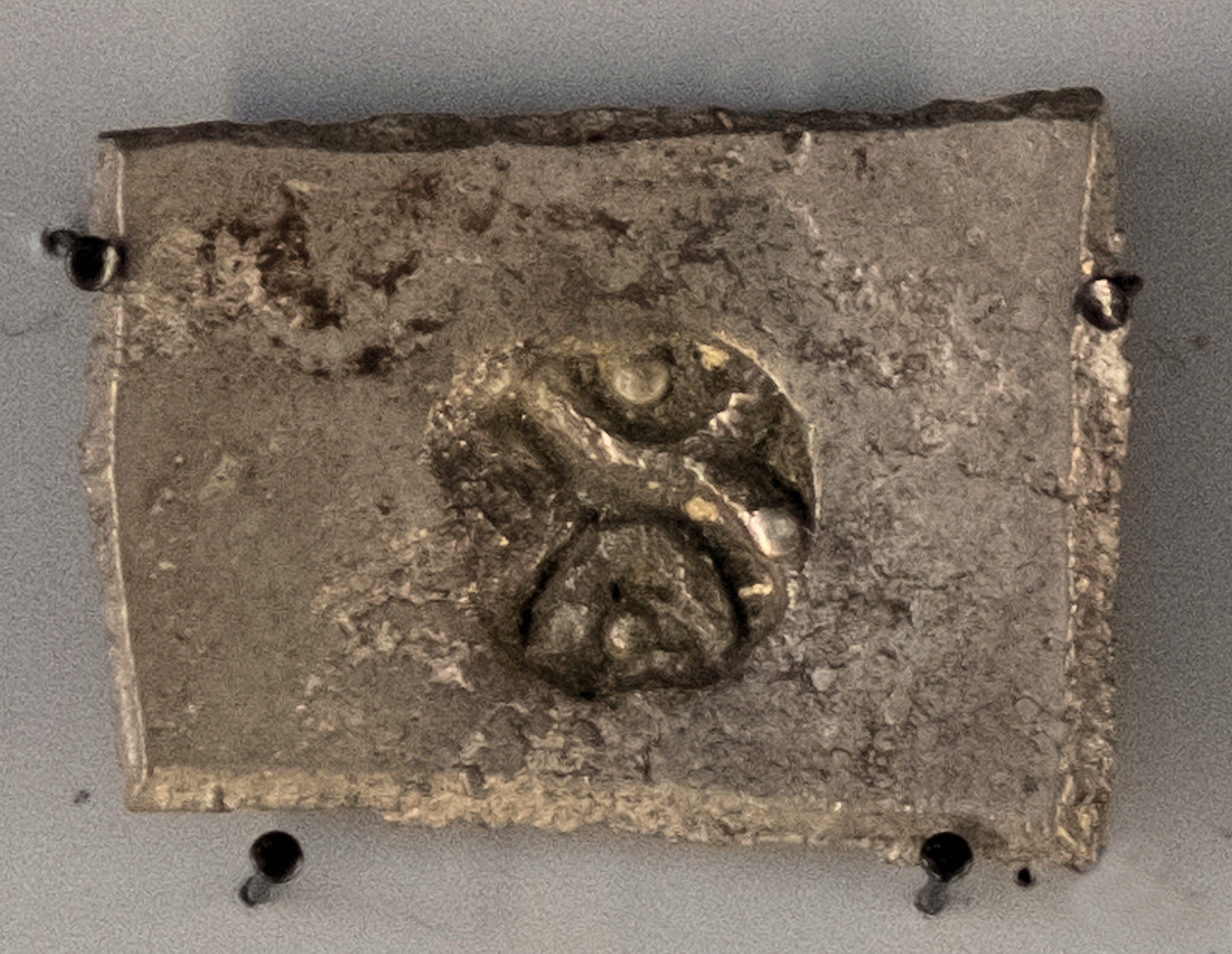
Kosala coin, 400-300 BCE

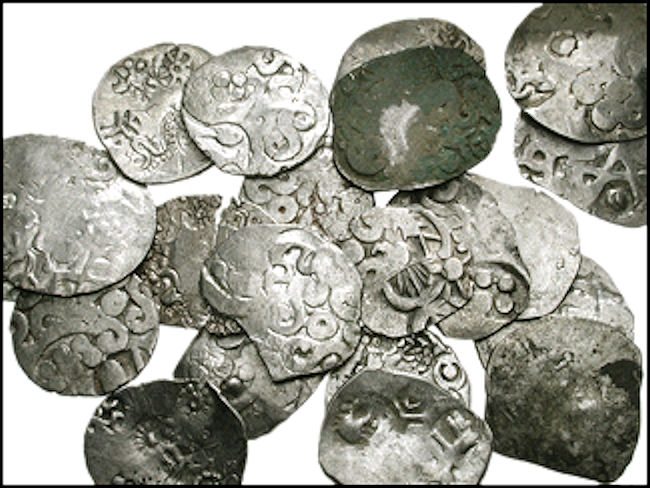
Kosala Karshapana, 5th century BCE.

By the 5th century BCE under the reign of King Mahakosala, the neighboring Kingdom of Kashi had been conquered. Mahakosala's daughter was the first wife of King Bimbisara of Magadha. As a dowry, Bimbisara received a Kashi village that had a revenue of 100,000. This marriage temporarily eased tensions between Koshala and Magadha.

By the time of Mahākosala's son Pasenadi, Kosala had become the suzerain of the Kālāma tribal republic, and Pasenadi's realm maintained friendly relations with the powerful Licchavi tribe which lived to the east of his kingdom.

During Pasenadi's reign, a Mallaka named Bandhula who had received education in Takṣaśilā, had offered his services as a general to the Kauśalya king so as to maintain the good relations between the Mallakas and Kosala. Later, Bandhula, along with his wife Mallikā, violated the Abhiseka-Pokkharaṇī sacred tank of the Licchavikas, which resulted in armed hostilities between the Kauśalya and the Licchavikas. Bandhula was later treacherously murdered along with his sons by Pasenadi. In retaliation, some Mallakas helped Pasenadi's son Viḍūḍabha usurp the throne of Kosala to avenge the death of Bandhula, after which Pasenadi fled from Kosala and died in front of the gates of the Māgadhī capital of Rājagaha.

At some point during his reign, Viḍūḍabha fully annexed the Kālāmas. That the Kālāmas did not request a share of the Buddha's relics after his death was possibly because they had lost their independence by then.

Shortly after the Buddha's death, the Viḍūḍabha invaded the Sakya and Koliya republics, seeking to conquer their territories because they had once been part of Kosala. Viḍūḍabha finally triumphed over the Sakyas and Koliyas and annexed their state after a long war with massive loss of lives on both sides. Details of this war were exaggerated by later Buddhist accounts, which claimed that Viḍūḍabha's invasion was in retaliation for having given in marriage to his father the slave girl who became Viḍūḍabha's mother, and that he exterminated the Sakyas. In actuality, Viḍūḍabha's invasion of Sakya might instead have had similar motivations to the Māgadhī king Ajātasattu's conquest of the Vajjika League because he was the son of a Vajjika princess and was therefore interested in the territory of his mother's homeland. The result of the Kauśalya invasion was that the Sakyas and Koliyas were absorbed into Viḍūḍabha's kingdom.

The massive life losses incurred by Kosala during its conquest of Sakya weakened it significantly enough that it was itself was soon annexed by its eastern neighbour, the kingdom of Magadha, and Viḍūḍabha was defeated and killed by the Māgadhī king Ajātasattu.

Under the reign of Mahapadma Nanda of Magadha, Koshala rebelled but the rebellion was put down.

=== Under Mauryan rule ===
It is assumed that during the Mauryan reign, Kosala was administratively under the viceroy at Kaushambi. The Sohgaura copper plate inscription, probably issued during the reign of Chandragupta Maurya deals with a famine in Shravasti and the relief measures to be adopted by the officials. The Yuga Purana section of the Garga Samhita mentions about the Yavana (Indo-Greek) invasion and subsequent occupation of Saket during the reign of the last Maurya ruler Brihadratha or Pushyamitra Shunga.

=== Post-Mauryan period ===
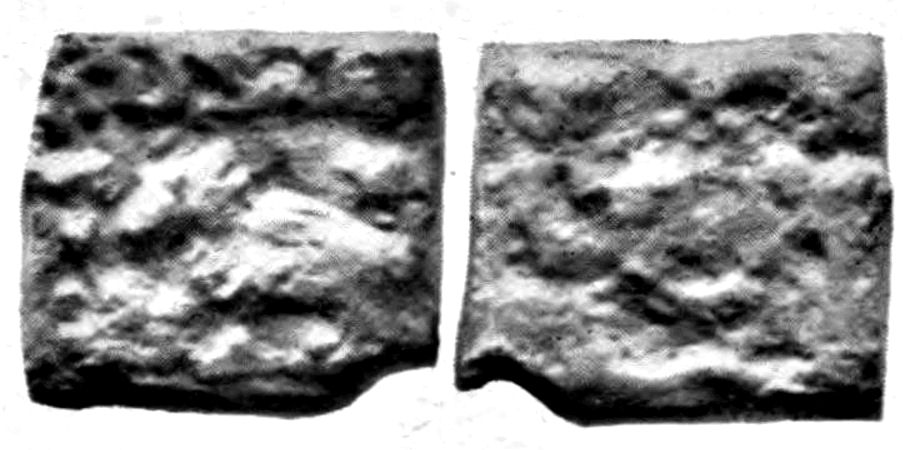
Coin of ruler Muladeva, minted in Ayodhya, Kosala. Obv: Muladevasa, elephant to left facing symbol. Rev: Wreath, above symbol, below snake.

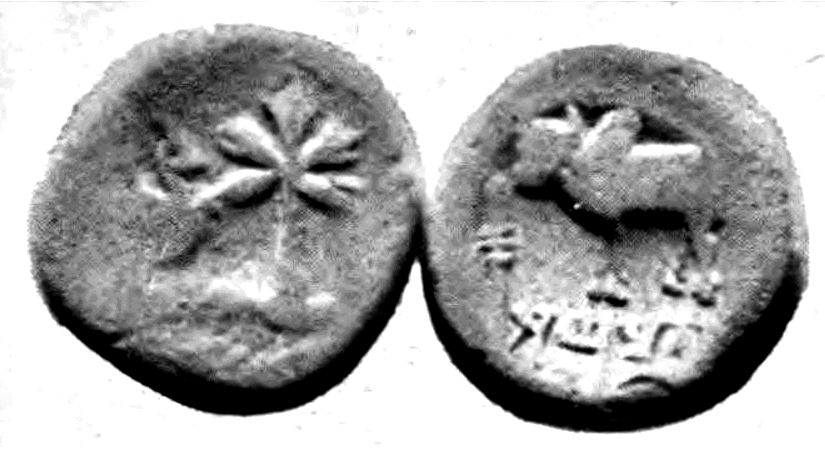
Coin of ruler Aryamitra, issued in Ayodhya, Kosala. Obv: peacock to right facing tree. Rev: Name Ayyamitasa, humped bull to left facing pole.

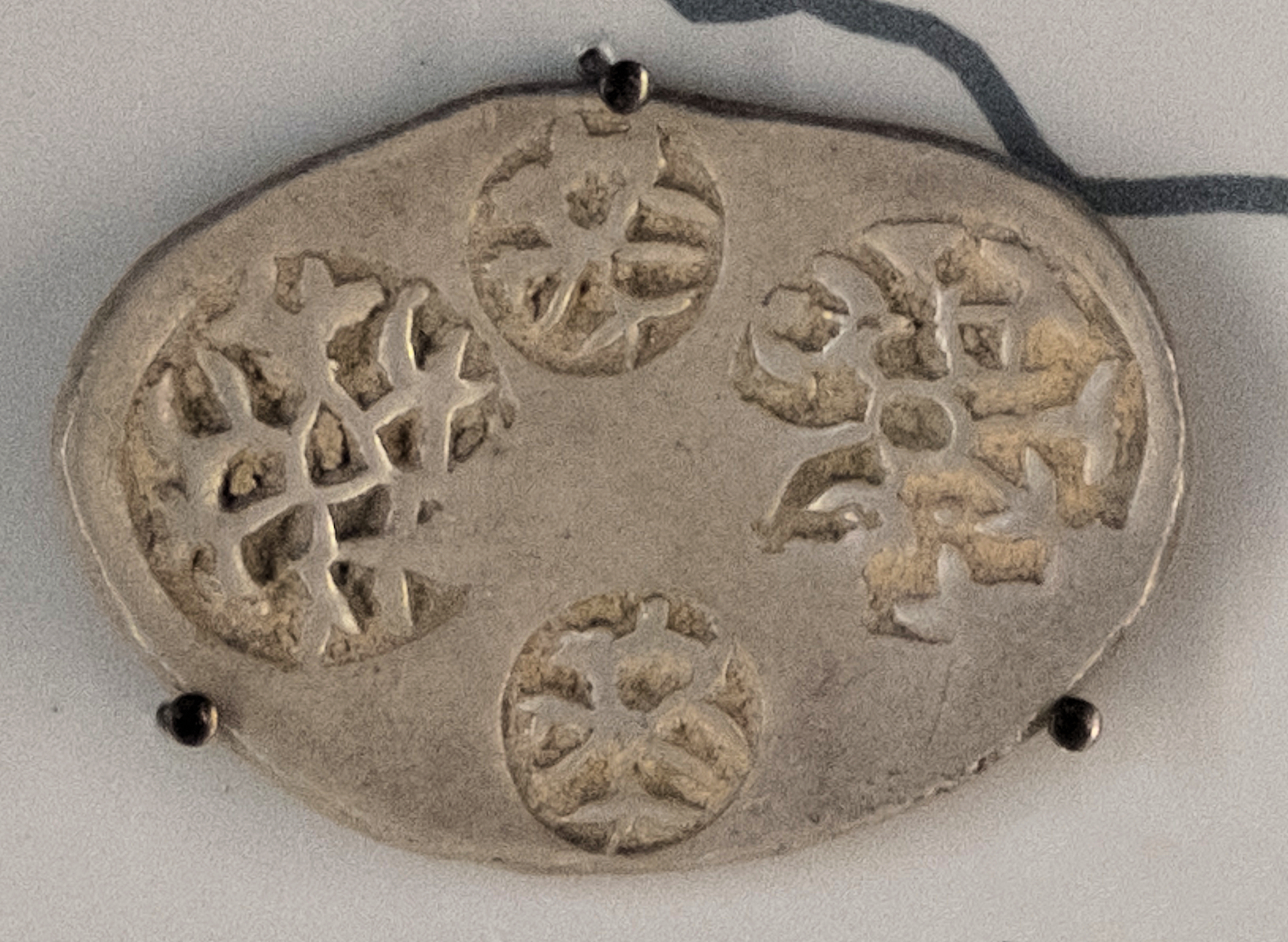
Kashi coin, 400-300 BCE.

The names of a number of rulers of Kosala of the post-Maurya period are known from the square copper coins issued by them, mostly found at Ayodhya. The rulers, forming the Deva dynasty, are: Muladeva, Vayudeva, Vishakhadeva, Dhanadeva, Naradatta, Jyesthadatta and Shivadatta. There is no way to know whether king Muladeva of the coins is identifiable with Muladeva, murderer of the Shunga ruler Vasumitra or not (though a historian, Jagannath has tried to do so). King Dhanadeva of the coins is identified with king Dhanadeva (1st century BCE) of Ayodhya inscription. In this Sanskrit inscription, King Kaushikiputra Dhanadeva mentions about setting a ketana (flag-staff) in memory of his father, Phalgudeva. In this inscription he claimed himself as the sixth in descent from Pushyamitra Shunga. Dhanadeva issued both cast and die-struck coins and both the types have a bull on obverse.

Other local rulers whose coins were found in Kosala include: a group of rulers whose name ends in "-mitra" is also known from their coins: Satyamitra, Aryamitra, Vijayamitra and Devamitra, sometimes called the "Late Mitra dynasty of Kosala". Other rulers known from their coins are: Kumudasena, Ajavarman and Sanghamitra.

== See also ==
- Kosala Kingdom
- Ayodhya
- Rama
- Prasenjit of Kosala
- Janapada
- Mahajanapada
- Ancestors of Rama
- List of Ikshvaku dynasty kings
