= Pasenadi =

6th-century BCE ruler of Indian state of Kosala

- Raja
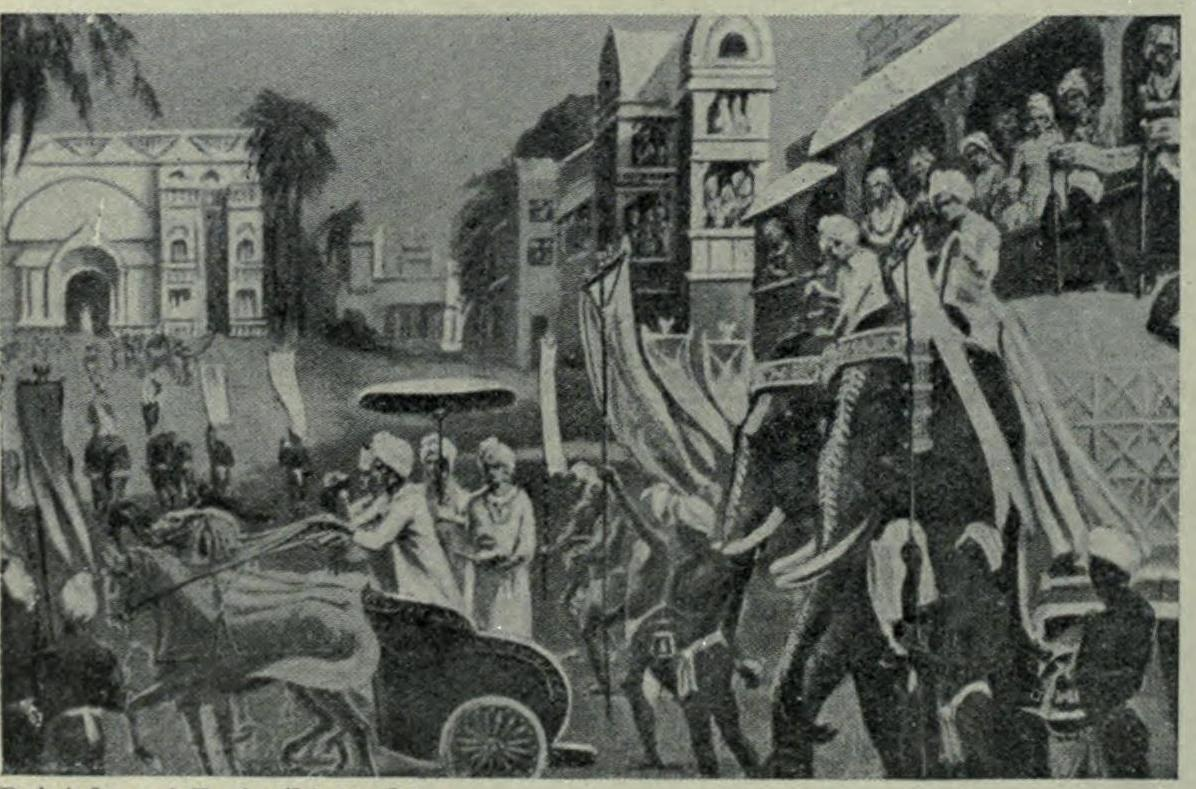
- Prasenajit of Kosala pays a visit to the Buddha

King of Kosala
- Reign: 6th or 5th century BCE
- Predecessor: Sanjaya Mahākosala
- Successor: Viḍūḍabha
- Queen: Mallika of Kosala
- Issue: Jeta, Virudhaka, Princess Vajira
- Dynasty: Ikshvaku
- Father: Dhaj

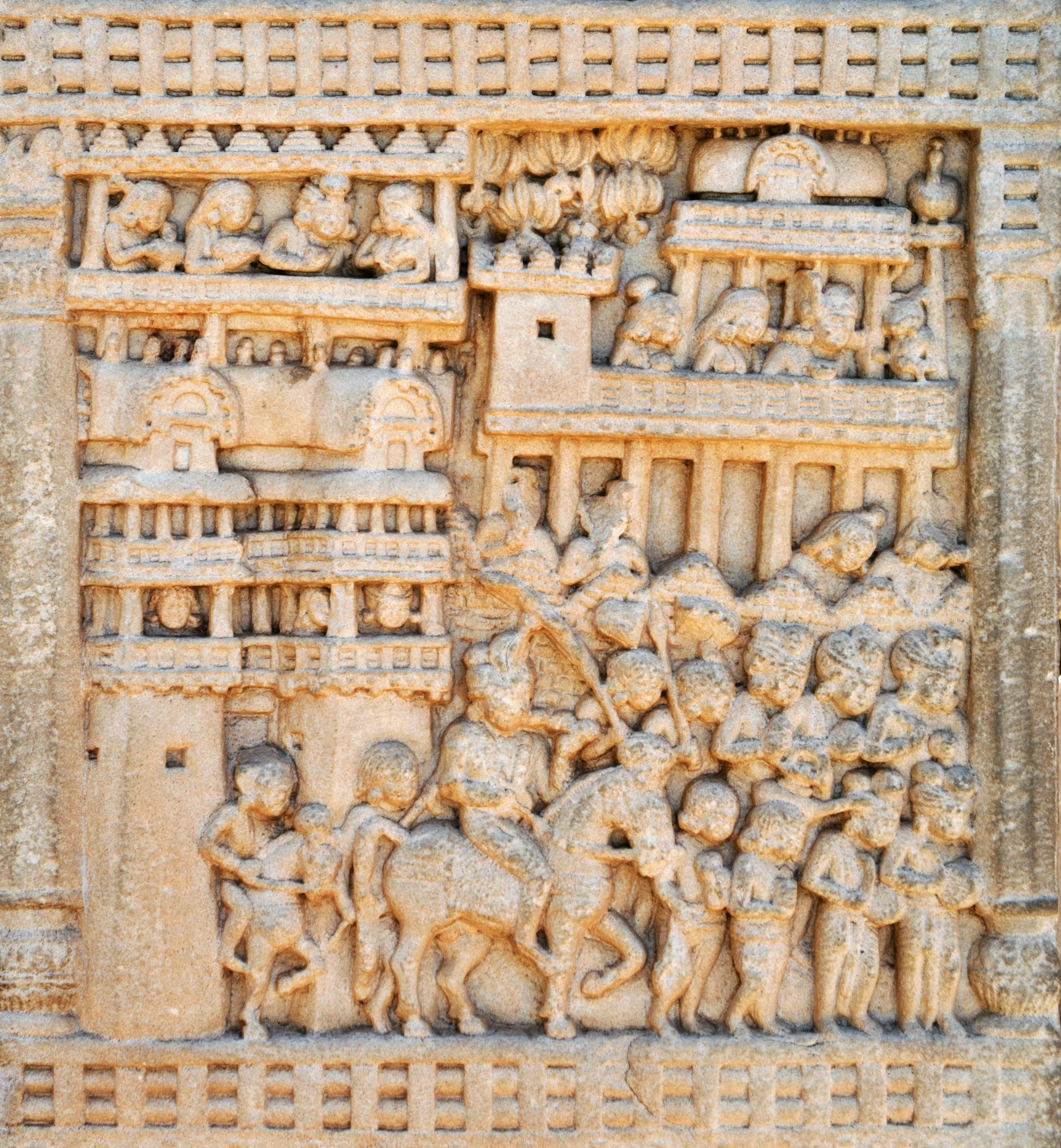
Procession of Prasenajit of Kosala leaving Sravasti to meet the Buddha. Sanchi

Pasenadi or Prasenajit (Pali: पसेनदि, romanized: Pasenadi; Sanskrit: प्रसेनजित्, romanized: Prasenajit;) was a 6th or 5th century BCE Aikṣvāka ruler of Kosala, where Shravasti was his capital. He succeeded after Sanjaya Mahākosala. As a king, he was a prominent Upāsaka or lay follower of Gautama Buddha, and built many Buddhist monasteries for the Buddha.

== Life ==
Pasenadi studied in Taxila in his early life. He was the king of Kosala (modern Oudh or Awadh). His first queen was a Magadhan princess, a sister of king Bimbisara. His second and chief queen was Vāsavakhattiyā, a Sākya girl, daughter of the chief of garland-makers for Mahānāma. From this marriage, he had a son, Viḍūḍabha and a daughter, Princess Vajira, who was later married to his nephew, Ajatashatru (Pali: Ajātasattu). He married his sister Kosala Devi to Bimbisara.

=== Reign ===
By the time of Pasenadi, Kosala had become the suzerain of the Kālāma tribal republic, and Pasenadi's realm maintained friendly relations with the powerful Licchavi tribe which lived to the east of his kingdom.

During Pasenadi's reign, a Mallaka named Bandhula who had received education in Takṣaśilā, had offered his services as a general to the Kauśalya king so as to maintain the good relations between the Mallakas and Kosala. Later, Bandhula, along with his wife Mallikā, violated the Abhiseka-Pokkharaṇī sacred tank of the Licchavikas, which resulted in armed hostilities between the Kauśalya and the Licchavikas. Bandhula was later treacherously murdered along with his sons by Pasenadi. In retaliation, some Mallakas helped Pasenadi's son Viḍūḍabha usurp the throne of Kosala to avenge the death of Bandhula, after which Pasenadi fled from Kosala and died in front of the gates of the Māgadhī capital of Rājagaha.

The Puranas instead of Viḍūḍabha mention the name of Kṣudraka as his successor.

Preceded by Mahākosala	King of Kosala	Succeeded by Viḍūḍabha
