= Viḍūḍabha =

Last ruler of Kosala kingdom

King of Kosala
- Reign: 5th century BC
- Predecessor: Pasenadi
- Successor: Kingdom abolished
- Born: Kosala
- Father: Pasenadi
- Mother: Vasavakhattiya

Viḍūḍabha (Pali: विडूडभ Viḍūḍabha; Sanskrit: विरूढक Virūḍhaka) was a king of Kosala during the lifetime of the Buddha.

== Life ==
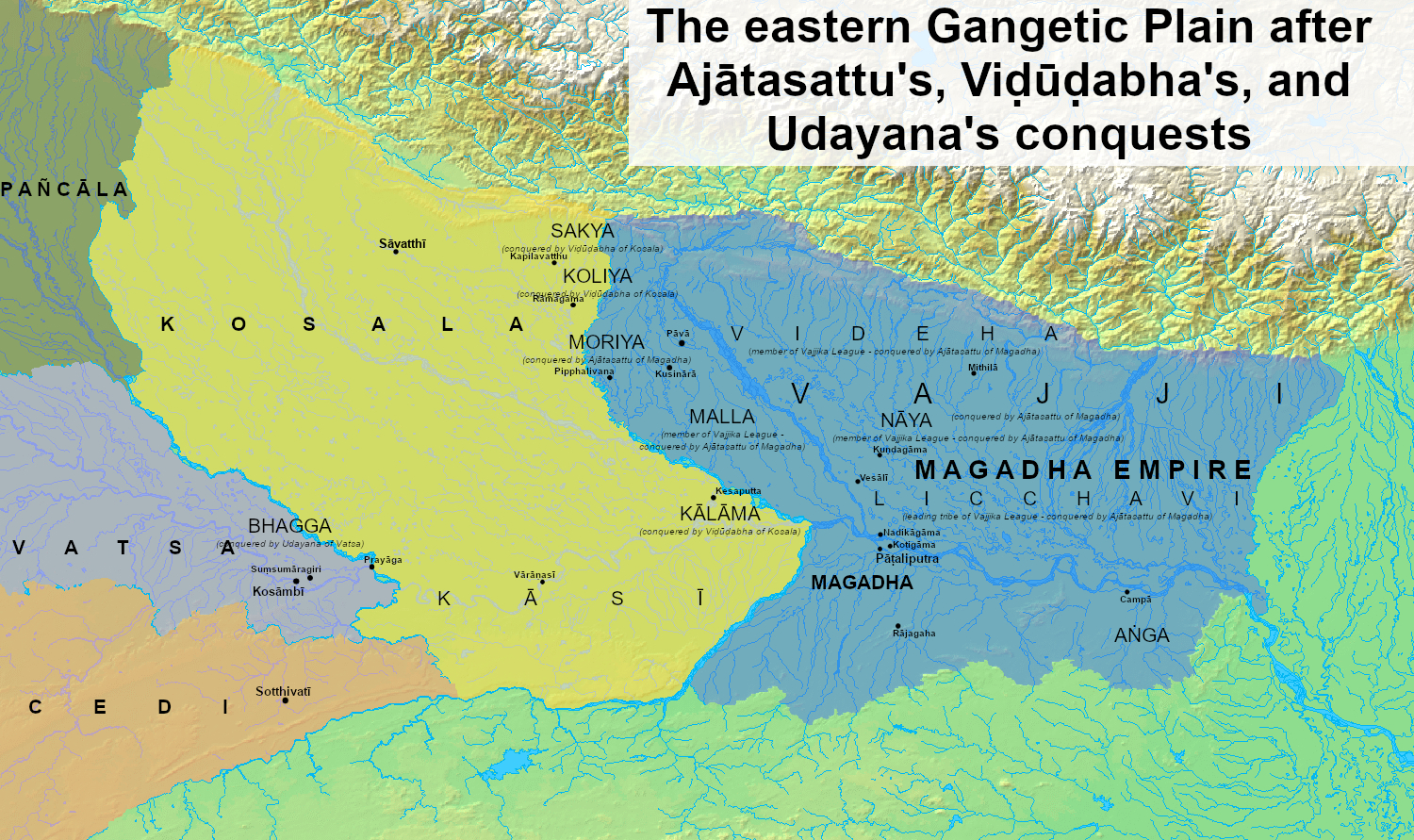
Map of the eastern Gangetic plain after Viḍūḍabha's conquest of Kālāma, Sakya and Koliya

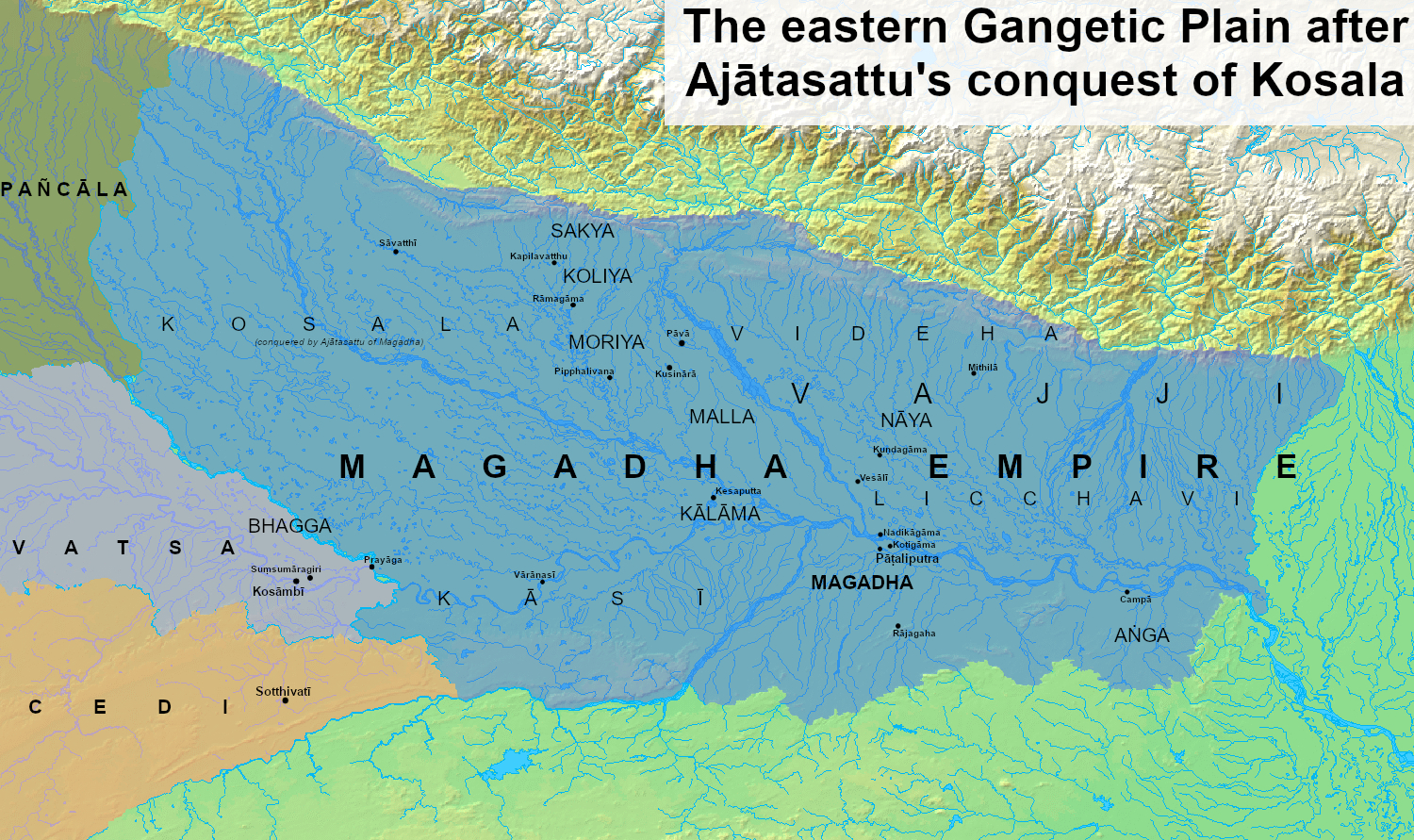
The eastern Gangetic plain after Viḍūḍabha's defeat by Ajātasattu of Magadha

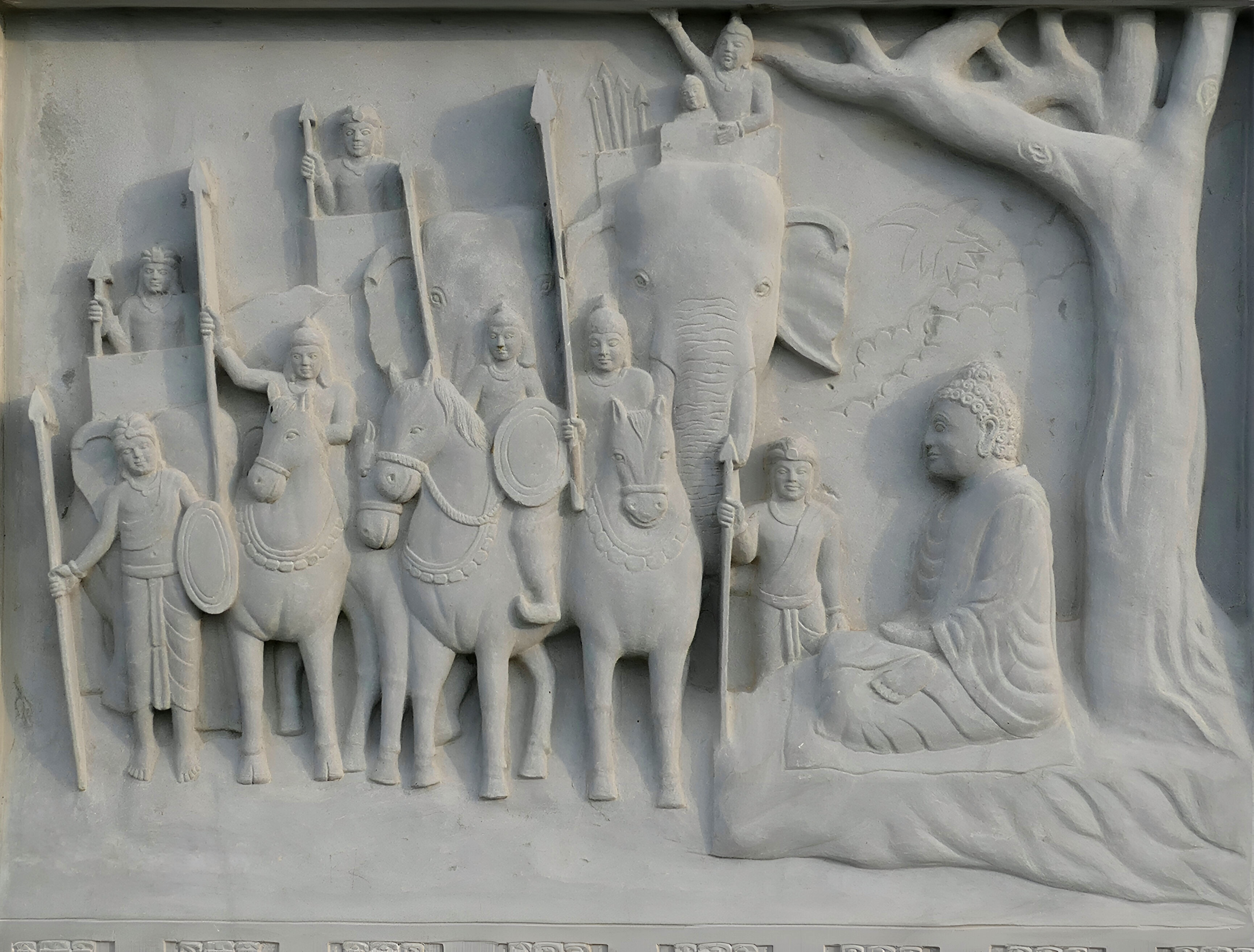
The Buddha Prevents King Vidudabha from Attacking the Sakyans, Buddhavanam Stupa Drum Reliefs, Telangana, photograph by Anandajoti Bhikkhu

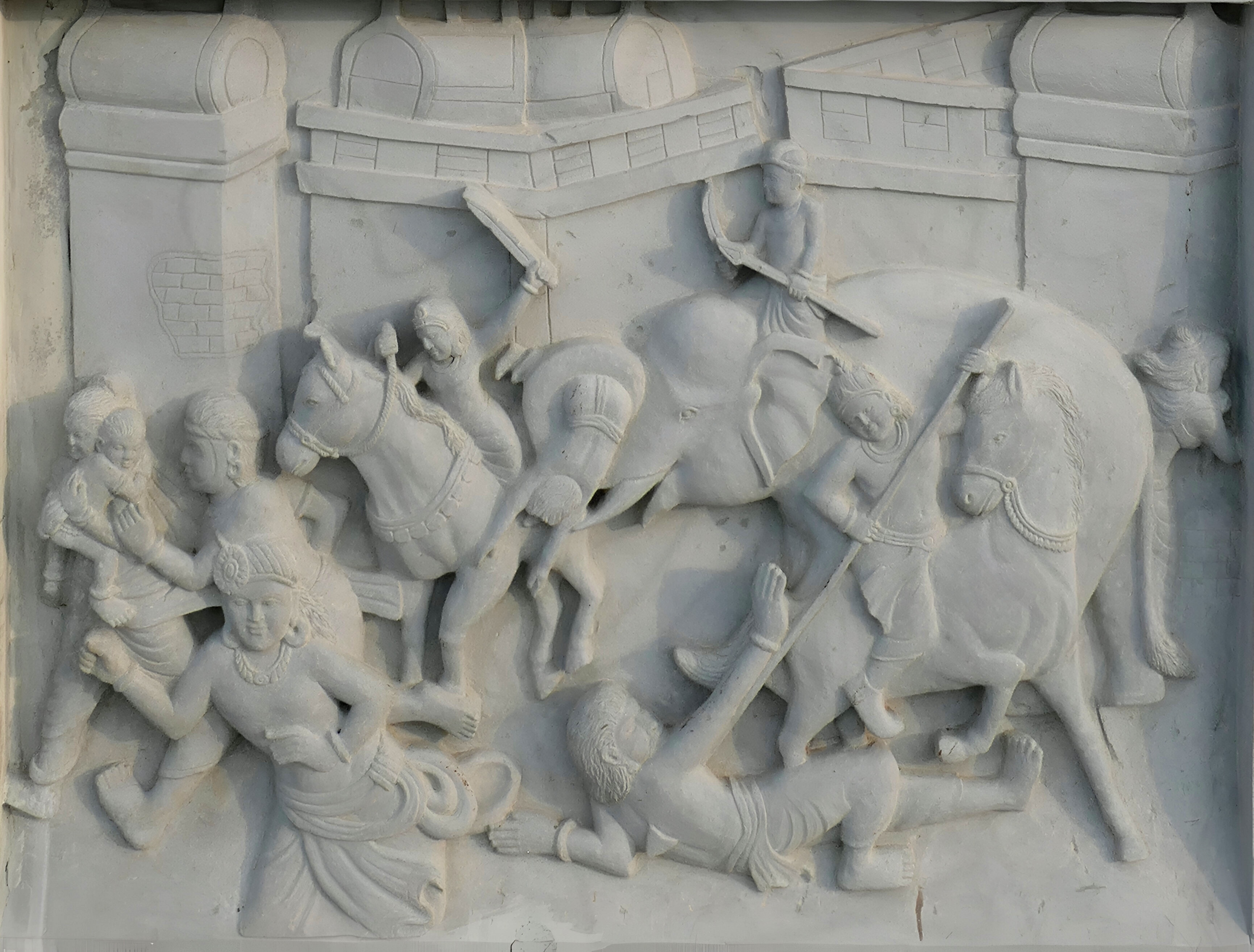
King Vidudabha Attacks the Sakyans, Buddhavanam Stupa Drum Reliefs, Telangana, photograph by Anandajoti Bhikkhu

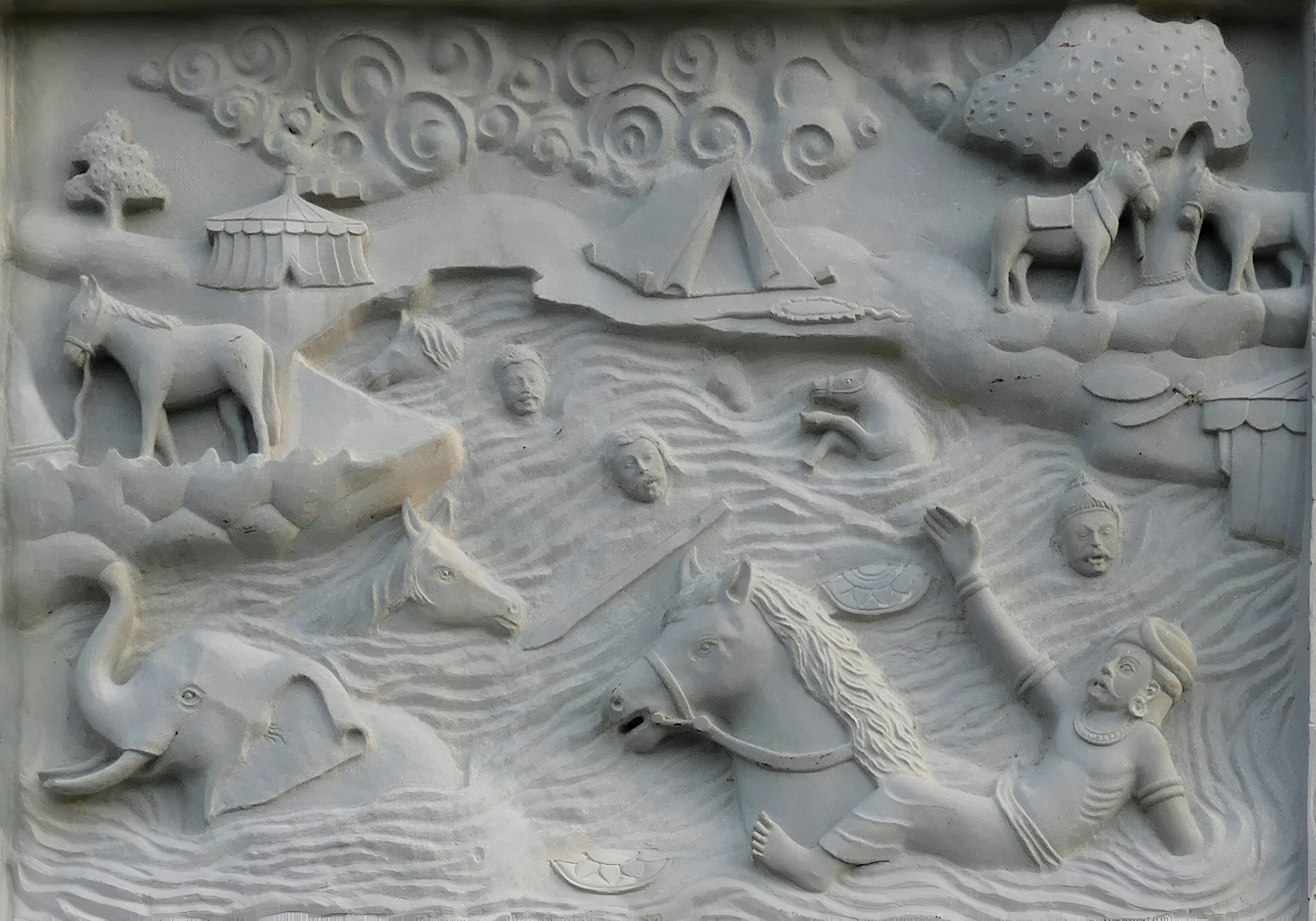
Vidudabha and His Army Are Swept Away, Buddhavanam Stupa Drum Reliefs, Telangana, photograph by Anandajoti Bhikkhu

=== Early life ===
He was the son of Prasenajit and Vāsavakhattiyā, the daughter of a Shakyan chief named Mahānāma by a slave girl Nāgamundā. He grew up to be a handsome and healthy young man. He was curious about his grandfather (Mahānāma) and grandmother (Nāgamundā), but his mother Vāsavakhattiyā kept preventing him from visiting them. However, one day, she finally gave in. In the Shakya realm, he did not receive a warm welcome as he expected (for he was the son of a slave girl) and was offended when he learnt about his mother's true identity.

=== Rise to power ===
During Pasenadi's reign, a Mallaka named Bandhula who had received education in Takṣaśilā, had offered his services as a general to the Kauśalya king so as to maintain the good relations between the Mallakas and Kosala. Later, Bandhula, along with his wife Mallikā, violated the Abhiseka-Pokkharaṇī sacred tank of the Licchavikas, which resulted in armed hostilities between the Kauśalya and the Licchavikas. Bandhula was later treacherously murdered along with his sons by Pasenadi. In retaliation, some Mallakas helped Pasenadi's son Viḍūḍabha usurp the throne of Kosala to avenge the death of Bandhula, after which Pasenadi fled from Kosala and died in front of the gates of the Māgadhī capital of Rājagaha.

=== Reign ===
At some point during his reign, Viḍūḍabha fully annexed the Kālāma republic which was already a vassal of Kosala. That the Kālāmas did not request a share of the Buddha's relics after his death was possibly because they had lost their independence by then.

Shortly after the Buddha's death, Viḍūḍabha invaded the Sakya and Koliya republics, seeking to conquer their territories because they had once been part of Kosala. Viḍūḍabha finally triumphed over the Sakyas and Koliyas and annexed their state after a long war with massive loss of lives on both sides. Details of this war were exaggerated by later Buddhist accounts, which claimed that Viḍūḍabha's invasion was in retaliation for a slave girl given in marriage to his father who became Viḍūḍabha's mother, and that he exterminated the Sakyas. In actuality, Viḍūḍabha's invasion of Sakya might instead have had similar motivations to the Māgadhī king Ajātasattu's conquest of the Vajjika League because he was the son of a Vajjika princess and was therefore interested in the territory of his mother's homeland. The result of the Kauśalya invasion was that the Sakyas and Koliyas merely lost political importance after being annexed into Viḍūḍabha's kingdom. The Sakyas nevertheless soon disappeared as an ethnic group after their annexation, having become absorbed into the population of Kosala, with only a few displaced families maintaining the Sakya identity afterwards. The Koliyas likewise disappeared as a polity and as a tribe soon after their annexation.

The massive life losses incurred by Kosala during its conquest of Sakya weakened it significantly enough that it eventually was soon annexed by its eastern neighbour, the kingdom of Magadha, and Viḍūḍabha was defeated and killed by the Māgadhī king Ajātasattu.

== Sources ==
- Sastri, K. A. Nilakanta, ed. (1988) [1967], Age of the Nandas and Mauryas (Second ed.), Delhi: Motilal Banarsidass, ISBN 81-208-0465-1
- Sen, Sailendra Nath (1999) [1988], Ancient Indian History and Civilization (Second ed.), New Age International Publishers, ISBN 81-224-1198-3
- Sharma, J. P. (1968). Republics in Ancient India, C. 1500 B.C.-500 B.C. Leiden, Netherlands: E. J. Brill. pp. 179–180. ISBN 978-9-004-02015-3.
- Basham, A. L. The Wonder That was India. New York: Hawthorn Books, 1963.

Regnal titles
Preceded by Pasenadi	King of Kosala; 5th century BC	Succeeded by Māgadhī conquest
