= Chandragupta Maurya =

Founder of the Maurya Empire (340–295 BCE)

Chandragupta Maurya 𑀘𑀦𑁆𑀤𑁆𑀭𑀕𑀼𑀧𑁆𑀢 𑀫𑁅𑀭𑀬𑀸 Sandrakottos
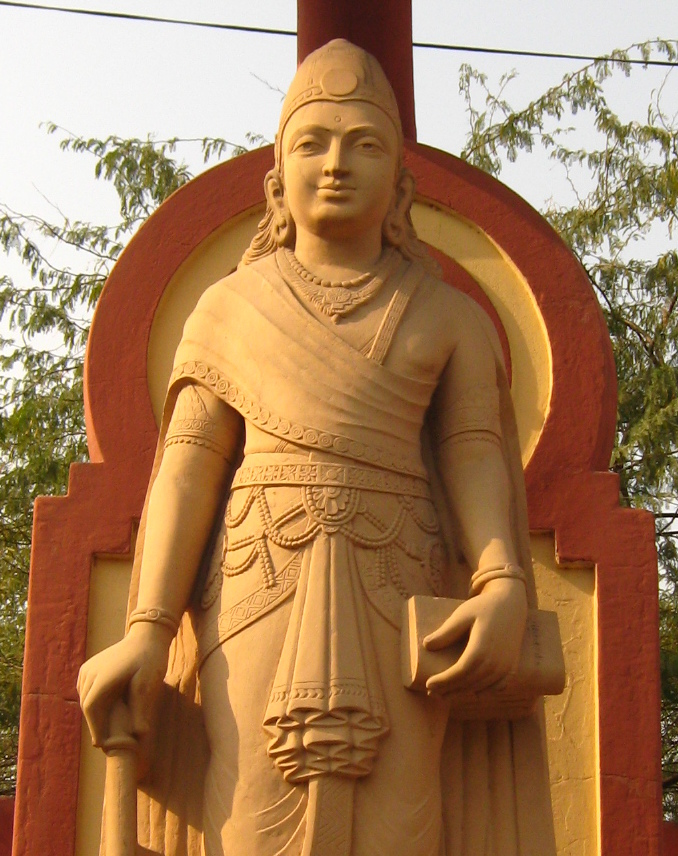

1st Mauryan Emperor
- Reign: c. 320 – c. 297 BCE
- Coronation: c. 320 BCE
- Predecessor: Position established
- Successor: Bindusara
- Born: possibly c. 350–340 BCE unknown
- Died: after c. 297 BCE; Kalbappu (Chandragiri) (present-day Karnataka, India) (According to Jain tradition)
- Spouse: Durdhara; A daughter of Seleucus I and Apama (name unknown)
- Issue: Bindusara
- Dynasty: Maurya

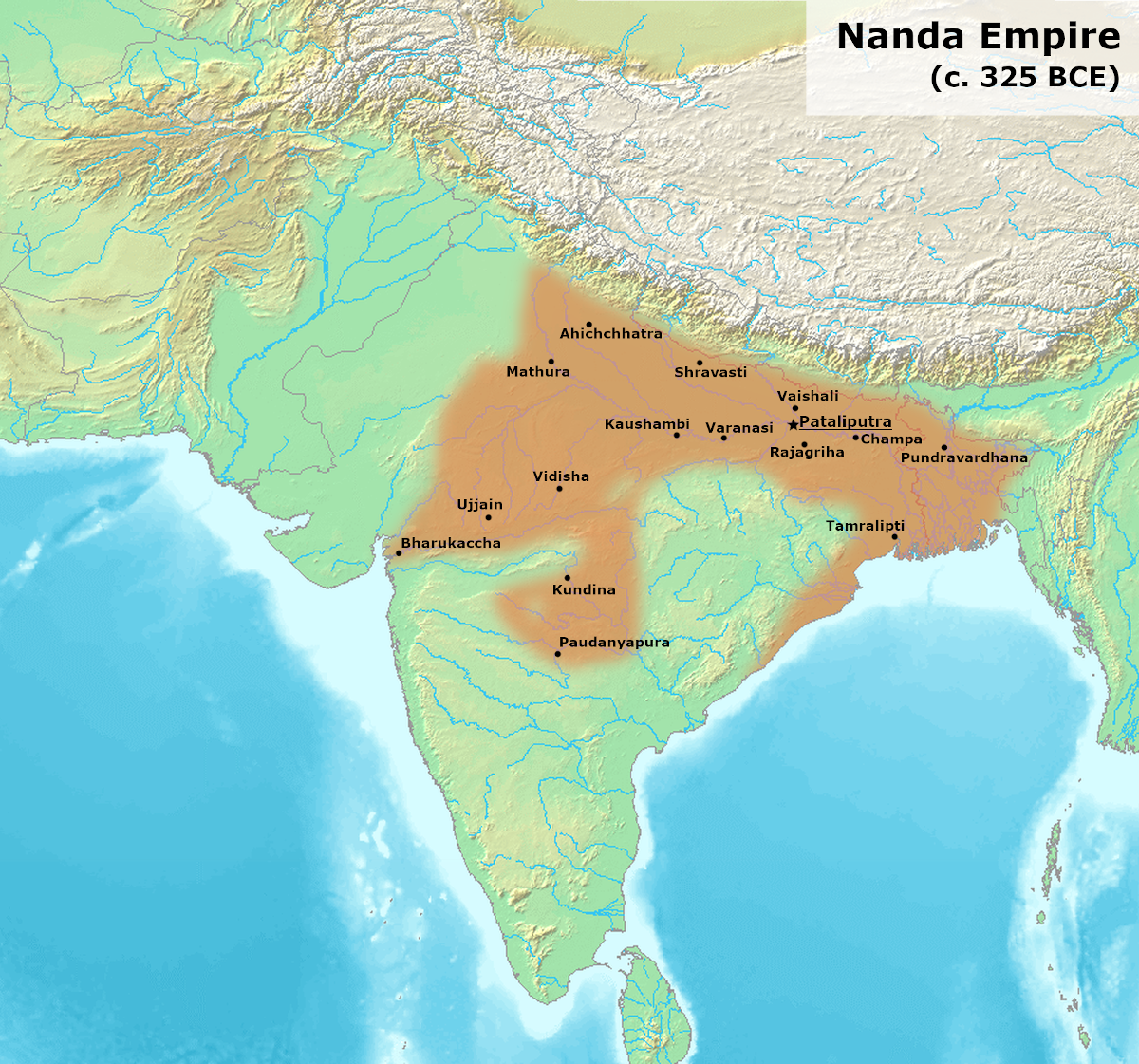
Possible extent of Nanda Empire, c. 325 BCE.

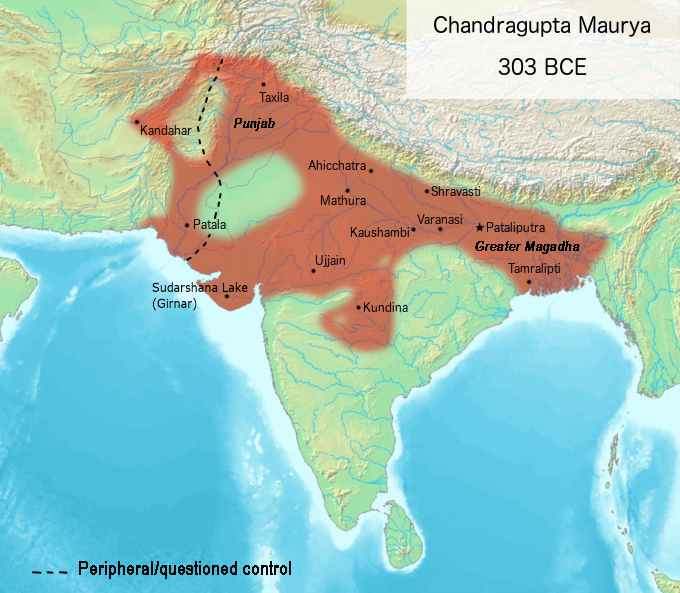
There are no contemporary records of Chandragupta's military conquests and the reach of his empire. The extent is deduced from Greek and Roman historians and religious Indian texts, all written centuries after his death. Based on these, Chandragupta's empire was extensive, here conceptualized at c. 303 BCE as a network of core areas and trade- and communication-networks. (Note: See also Maurya Empire, network model.) (Note: The western extent is disputed. Gedrosia and Kandahar: Kosmin (2014, p. 33): "Seleucus transferred to Chandragupta's kingdom the easternmost satrapies of his empire, certainly Gandhara, Parapamisadae [Kabul], and the eastern parts of Gedrosia, and possibly also Arachosia [Kandahar] and Aria as far as Herat."; Kosmin (2014, p. 277): "The discovery in Kandahar of two royal edicts issued by Chandragupta's famous grandson, Ashoka, confirming Mauryan possession of Arachosia, at least by the mid-third century; [...] in the absence of evidence of later Mauryan expansion and with the friendly relations maintained between the two kingdoms (see later), the most economical explanation is that Seleucus ceded the region of Kandahar, but the state of our evidence obliges caution."; Parapamisadae (Kabul) and Arachosia (Kandahar): Tarn (1922, p. 100) and Coningham & Young (2015, pp. 452–453) have questioned the inclusion of eastern Afghanistan (Kabul-Kandahar). Coningham & Young (2015, p. 452) note that "a growing number of researchers would now agree that the Ashokan edicts may have represented 'an area of maximum contact rather than streamlined bureacrayic control'."; Gedrosia: Smith (1914, p. 149): "The satrapy of Gedrosia (or Gadrosia) extended far to the west, and probably only the eastern part of it was annexed by Chandragupta. The Malin range of mountains,[c] which Alexander experienced such difficulty in crossing, would have furnished a natural boundary."; Tarn (1922, p. 100): "In Gedrosia the boundary is known: the country ceded was that between the Median Hydaspes (probably the Purali[e]) and the Indus."; Gujarat: Chakrabarty (2010, p. 29): "We are assuming that the basic historical-geographical configuration of the Magadhan power was achieved before the beginning of the Maurya dynasty, whose founder Chandragupta Maurya simply added to it the stretch from the Indus valley to the southern foot of the Hindukush, giving the Mauryan India a strong foothold in the Oxus to the Indus interaction zone of Indian history. The evidence is in some cases, as in the cases of Gujarat, Bengal, and Assam, shadowy, but if Chandragupta had undertaken expeditions in these directions, there would have been echoes of these expeditions in the literary traditions."; Aria (Herat): Raychaudhuri & Mukherjee (1997, p. 594):"[Aria] has been wrongly included in the list of ceded satrapies by some scholars [...] on the basis of wrong assessments of the passage of Strabo [...] and a statement by Pliny."; Grainger (2014, p. 109): "Seleucus "must [...] have held Aria", and furthermore, his "son Antiochos was active there fifteen years later."; Sherwin-White & Kuhrt (1993, pp. 79–80): "The region of Aria is definitely known to have been Seleucid under Seleucus I and Antiochus I as it definitely was after Antiochus III's great campaign in the east against the Parthians and Bactrians. [...] There is no evidence whatever that it did not remain Seleucid, like Drangiana, with which it is linked by easy routes."; "For more than a century, the Seleucids remained in control of the [Drangiana] region. [...] Drangiana was conquered by the Parthians." .)

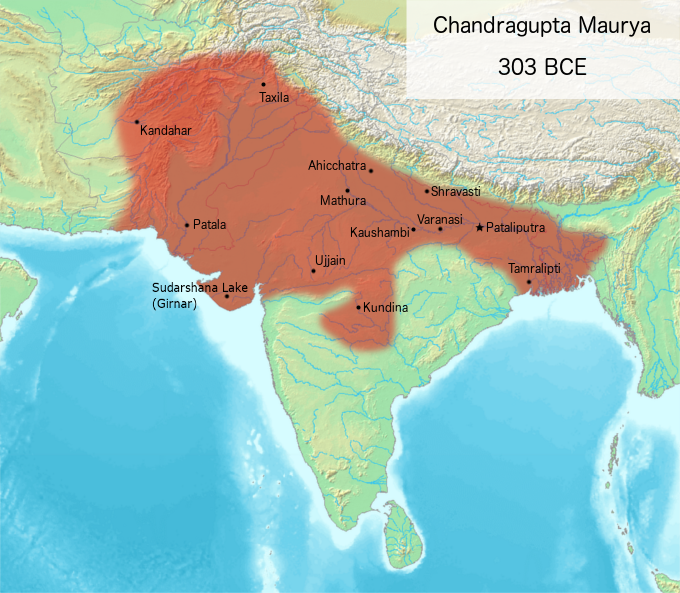
Traditional representation of extent of Chandragupta Maurya's empire c. 303 BCE, as a solid mass of territory. (Note: See also Mauryan Empire, solid mass.) Some maps include all of Gedrosia, e.g., south-east Iran.

Chandragupta Maurya (Note: Sanskrit: चन्द्रगुप्त मौर्य IAST: Candragupta Maurya; Pali: चन्दगुत्त मोरीय, Chandagutta Moriya; Ancient Greek: Σανδράκοπτος, Sandrákoptos, Σανδράκοττος, Sandrákottos, Ἀνδροκόττος, Androkóttos) (reigned c. 320 BCE (Note: Dating: like his other dates, the date of Chandragupta's ascencion of the throne is uncertain. Jansari (2023, p. 18): "...widely, and casually, accepted that Chandragupta came to power in c.320/319 bc. However, all of the information concerning Chandragupta’s rise to power and the dates of his reign must be treated with caution: the evidence, such as it is, is based on limited and problematic Graeco-Roman and South Asian sources, little of the content of which is contemporary with the events they report." Chandragupta's conquest of the Punjab happened after a prolonged period of unrest and warfare, and, synchronized with Greek history, happened around 317 BCE (Jansari 2023, p. 17). Jansari, admitting that c.320/319 BCE is the date conventionally accepted by most scholars, follows Cribb in re-assessing Justin (XV section 4.12-22), who states that Chandragupta’s became "‘ruler of India’ when Seleucus was ‘laying the foundations’ of his own empire." According to Jansari, "this reference appears to refer to the period c.311– c.308 bc," implying that "Chandragupta gained power, and was possibly already the first Mauryan king, between c.311 and c.305 bc" (Jansari 2023, pp. 30–31): Jansari (2023, pp. 17–18): "Most scholars assert that Chandragupta’s arrival here came after his overthrow of the Nanda dynasty and his establishment of his own dynasty in its place. This timing, however, like many other aspects of Chandragupta’s reign, remains uncertain, and some scholars have also suggested that Chandragupta’s activities in the region preceded the foundation of the Mauryan empire. [note 15] The inconclusive and problematic evidence for Chandragupta’s life and events means that either interpretation is possible."; Jansari (2023, p. 36, note 15): "The commentary alongside this section of Justin in Yardley, Wheatley and Heckel (2011, 278–9) provides a good overview of the arguments, from those put forward by scholars writing in the early nineteenth century to those of recent decades, in relation to the timing of Chandragupta’s arrival in the region before or after he took the Nanda throne."; Jansari (2023, pp. 29–30): "According to Justin, it was around the time that Eudamus murdered Porus and travelled west, c.317 bc, that Chandragupta first entered the Punjab [...] It is also not clear how long Chandragupta had been in power at this stage. While some scholars have argued that he was still in the process of challenging Nanda supremacy, the general consensus at present, with a few exceptions couched in tentative language, is that he had already established his own dynasty. [note 67 ]"; Jansari (2023, p. p.38, note 67): "Just. Epit. 14.4.12–14. Trans. J. C. Yardley. Yardley, Wheatley and Heckel (2011, 278–9) provide a good overview of the way the scholarship falls on both sides of the debate. Singh (2008, 330) suggests the possibility that Chandragupta was in the process of empire-building when he arrived in the Punjab at this time.") – c. 298 BCE) (Note: Fisher (2018, p. 71): "Chandragupta (r. 320 – c. 298 BCE) led a rebellion that seized power in Magadha and founded the Maurya Dynasty. He located his capital Pataliputra (today’s Patna) at an especially strategic trading and defensive location, on the south bank of the Ganges where the Son River joined it. The actual origins of the Maurya family remain uncertain, but consensus holds that Chandragupta was low-born. One popular account asserts he was the previous king’s son by a low-ranked queen or concubine and overthrew his royal half-brothers. Maurya means “peacock,” and some Jain texts identify his family as low peacock herders, ranked by Brahmans as Shudra at best.) was the founder and the first emperor of the Maurya Empire, based in Magadha (present-day Bihar) in the Indian subcontinent.

His rise to power began in the period of unrest and local warfare that arose after Alexander the Great's Indian campaign and early death in 323 BCE, although the exact chronology and sequence of events remains subject to debate among historians. He started a war against the unpopular Nanda dynasty in Magadha on the Ganges Valley, defeated them and established his own dynasty. In addition, he raised an army to resist the Greeks, (Note: Boesche (2003), referring to Radha Kumud Mookerji, Chandragupta Maurya and His Times, 4th ed. (Delhi: Motilal Banarsidass, 1988 [1966]), 31, 28-33: "Just after Alexander's death in 323 B.C.E., Chandragupta and Kautilya began their conquest of India by stopping the Greek invaders. In this effort they assassinated two Greek governors, Nicanor and Philip, a strategy to keep in mind when I later examine Kautilya's approval of assassination. "The assassinations of the Greek governors," wrote Radha Kumud Mookerji, "are not to be looked upon as mere accidents."") defeated them, and took control of the eastern Indus Valley. His conquest of Magadha is generally dated to c. 322–319 BCE, and his expansion to Punjab subsequently at c. 317–312 BCE, (Note: It is noted by Jansari, "there is no statement in Justin relating to the start of Chandragupta’s reign, simply that he was ‘ruler of India’ while Seleucus was securing and establishing the foundations of his own empire."(Jansari 2023, p. 31) Trautman interprets it as meaning that Chandragupta had already conquered both the Nanda Empire and Punjab at that point when Seleucus was coming to power in 311-305.(Trautmann 1970, pp. 59–60) Yardley, Wheatley and Heckel think that the conquest of Punjab / Indus Valley was still happening in 311-308 BCE, but after Chandragupta had already overthrown the Nandas to become king of Magadha.(Yardley, Wheatley & Heckel 2011, pp. 277–291): Tarn refers to some traditional Jain chronologies which place Chandragupta's accession in 313/312 BCE, but he interprets it to be date Chandragupta had completed his conquests, excepting the later western expansion acquired from Seleucus.(Tarn 1922, pp. 46–47) Tarn has interpreted Justin's original Latin passage differently from Trautman (who, p.59, footnote 1 criticizes Tarn for "straining the word-order and the sense and tense" of the Latin), interpreting it to be saying Chandragupta getting his kingdom contemporary with Seleucus. However, even so, Tarn (p.47, footnote 3) takes the view "Chandragupta seized the crown of Magadha c. 321 and completed the conquest of his empire by 312", excepting the later western expansion acquired from Seleucus.; The statement of Justin that "Chandragupta ‘gathered a band of outlaws and incited the Indians to revolution’ against the Nanda dynasty, after which ‘he was preparing for hostilities against Alexander’s governors’"(Jansari 2023, p. 29) has also been interpreted by (Trautmann 1970, pp. 57–58) and (Yardley, Wheatley & Heckel 2011, p. 289) as saying clearly that Chandragupta's conquest of Magadha took place before Alexander's satraps in Punjab were overthrown. However, they note that some scholars have nevertheless speculated about Chandragupta becoming a ruler in Punjab first, before conquering Magadha.; Yardley, Wheatley and Heckel state that Justin's Epitome "is the critical text for reconstructing the chronology of events in India after the death of Alexander" but "matters of detail, sequence of events, and chronology are rendered difficult to interpret by the spasmodic and compressed nature of the Epitome, drawing second-hand, as it does" (Yardley, Wheatley & Heckel 2011, p. 277)) but some scholars have speculated that he might have initially consolidated his power base in Punjab, before conquering Magadha; an alternative chronology places these events all in the period c. 311–305 BCE. According to the play Mudrarakshasa, Chandragupta was assisted by his mentor Chanakya, who later became his minister. He expanded his reach subsequently into parts of the western Indus Valley (Note: Haig (1894, p. 24): "...the general rising of the northern peoples headed by Chandragupta, the founder of the Maurya dynasty of Pataliputra, followed in rapid succession. The Lower Indus Valley now became free from foreign rule, and the local chiefs were no doubt left to their own devices. Nominally the territory may have been a dependency of the Mauryan kingdom, but, separated from the main body of that kingdom by a wide expanse of desert, and at a vast distance from the capital on the Ganges, its tie of allegiance must have been of the slightest. This independence, or semi-independence, lasted under no doubt varying degrees of definiteness […] till […] Demetrius, in the second century B.C., invaded Patalene in force and completely subjected it to Bactria.") and possibly eastern Afghanistan through a dynastic marriage alliance with Seleucus I Nicator c. 305–303 BCE. His empire also included Gujarat (Note: Corroborated archaeologically at Sudarshana Lake.) and a geographically extensive network of cities and trade-routes.

There are no historical facts about Chandragupta's origins and early life, only legends, while the narrative of his reign is mainly deduced from a few fragments in Greek and Roman sources, and a few Indian religious texts, all written centuries after his death. The prevailing levels of technology and infrastructure limited the extent of Chandragupta's rule, (Note: Fisher (2018, p. 72): "Chandragupta’s many military and diplomatic conquests extended his overlordship further than any previous Indian ruler: from Afghanistan to Bengal and from the Himalayas down into the northern Deccan. But his administration lacked the technology and infrastructure to penetrate very deeply into society outside of Magadha.") and the administration was decentralised, with provinces and local governments, (Note: Stein & Arnold (2010): "Around 270 bce, the first Indian documentary records, issued by the Buddhist king Ashoka, were added to the Greek source. Though Ashoka’s inscriptions were deciphered in the nineteenth century, we still cannot be sure about the political formation that existed under this Mauryan king, much less under the kingdom’s founder, Ashoka’s grandfather Chandragupta, who was possibly a contemporary of Alexander. Evidence in the form of a Sanskrit treatise called the Arthashastra – depicting a centralized, tyrannical, spy-ridden and compul sively controlling regime – probably does not pertain to Mauryan times. If its political world was not pure theory, it could only have been achieved within a small city-state, not a realm as vast as that defined by the distribution of Ashoka’s inscriptions, over some 1500 miles from Afghanistan to southern India.") and large autonomous regions within its limits. (Note: Ludden (2013, pp. 29–30): "The geography of the Mauryan Empire resembled a spider with a small dense body and long spindly legs. The highest echelons of imperial society lived in the inner circle composed of the ruler, his immediate family, other relatives, and close allies, who formed a dynastic core. Outside the core, empire travelled stringy routes dotted with armed cities. Outside the palace, in the capital cities, the highest ranks in the imperial elite were held by military commanders whose active loyalty and success in war determined imperial fortunes. Wherever these men failed or rebelled, dynastic power crumbled. ... Imperial society flourished where elites mingled; they were its backbone, its strength was theirs. Kautilya’s Arthasastra indicates that imperial power was concentrated in its original heartland, in old Magadha, where key institutions seem to have survived for about seven hundred years, down to the age of the Guptas. Here, Mauryan officials ruled local society, but not elsewhere. In provincial towns and cities, officials formed a top layer of royalty; under them, old conquered royal families were not removed, but rather subordinated. In most janapadas, the Mauryan Empire consisted of strategic urban sites connected loosely to vast hinterlands through lineages and local elites who were there when the Mauryas arrived and were still in control when they left.") Chandragupta's reign, and the Maurya Empire, which reached its peak under his grandson Ashoka the Great, (Note: At its peak, the Mauryan Empire extended across North India, from modern day Bengal in the east, to as far westward as Afghanistan below the Hindu Kush, as well as making inroads into Central India and as far south as the northern Deccan: Bose & Jalal, p. 39): "The political history of the centuries following the rise of Buddhism and Jainism saw the emergence and consolidation of powerful regional states in northern India. Among the strongest of these was the kingdom of Magadha, with its capital at Pataliputra (near the modern city of Patna). The Magadhan kingdom expanded under the Maurya dynasty in the fourth and fifth centuries BCE to become an empire embracing almost the whole of the subcontinent. Chandragupta Maurya founded the dynasty in 322 BCE, just a few years after Alexander the Great's brief foray into northwestern India. The Maurya empire reached its apogee under the reign of Ashoka (268–231 BCE)."; Ludden (2013, p. 47): "IMPERIAL BHARAT The Mauryas defined an ancient territory called Bharat. Marching along old trade routes, the empire acquired the geometrical shape of a tall triangle with a broad base, with its apex in Magadha. One long northern leg ran west up the Ganga, across Punjab, into the Hindu Kush; and one long leg ran south-west from Pataliputra, up the Son river valley, down the Narmada River into Berar, Maharashtra, and Gujarat. The broad base spanned Punjab, the Indus, Rajasthan, Gujarat, and western Maharashtra. The northwestern frontier revolved around Gandhara and Kashmir; the south-western frontier around Nasika, now Nasik, in Maharashtra. North of Kashmir and west of the Khyber Pass, Greek dynasties held sway. South of Nasika, the Mauryan presence consisted primarily of diplomatic missions.") began an era of economic prosperity, reforms, infrastructure expansions. Buddhism, Jainism and Ājīvika prevailed over the non-Maghadian Vedic and Brahmanistic traditions, initiating, under Ashoka, the expansion of Buddhism, and the synthesis of Brahmanic and non-Brahmanic religious traditions which converged in Hinduism. His legend still inspires visions of an undivided Indian nation.

== Historical sources ==
Chandragupta's confrontations with the Greeks and the Nanda king are shortly referred to in a few passages in Greek-Roman sources from the 1st century BCE to the 2nd century CE. Impressions of India at that time are given by a number of other Greek sources. He is further mentioned in Brahmanical, Buddhist, and Jain religious texts and legends, which give impressions of his later reception; they significantly vary in detail. According to Mookerji, the main sources on Chandragupta and his time, in chronological order are:

- Greek sources by three companions of Alexander, namely Nearchus, Onesicritus, and Aristobulus of Cassandreia, who write about Alexander and do not mention Chandragupta;
- The Greek ambassador Megasthanes, a contemporary of Chandragupta, whose works are lost, but fragments are preserved in the works of other authors, namely Greco-Roman authors Strabo (64 BCE–19 CE), Diodorus (died c. 36 BCE, wrote about India), Arrian (c. 130–172 CE, wrote about India), Pliny the Elder (1st cent. CE, wrote about India), Plutarch (c. 45–125 CE), and Justin (2nd cent. CE). According to Mookerji, without these sources this period would be "a most obscure chapter of Indian history."
- The Brahmanical Puranas (Gupta-times), religious texts which viewed the Nandas and Mauryas as illegitimate rulers, because of their shudra background;
- Later Brahmanical narratives include legends in Vishakhadatta's Mudrarakshasa (4th–8th century), Somadeva's Kathasaritsagara (11th century) and Kshemendra's Brihatkathamanjari (11th century). Mookerji includes the Arthasastra as a source, a text now dated to the 1st–3rd century CE, and attributed to Chanakya during Gupta-times.
- The earliest Buddhist sources are dated to the fourth-century CE or after, including the Sri Lankan Pali texts Dipavamsa (Rajavamsa section), Mahavamsa, Mahavamsa tika and Mahabodhivamsa.
- 7th to 10th century Jain inscriptions at Shravanabelgola; these are disputed by scholars as well as the Svetambara Jain tradition. The second Digambara text interpreted to be mentioning the Maurya emperor is dated to about the 10th-century such as in the Brhatkathakosa of Harisena (Jain monk), while the complete Jain legend about Chandragupta is found in the 12th-century Parisishtaparvan by Hemachandra.

The Greek and Roman texts do not mention Chandragupta directly, except for a second-century text written by the Roman historian Justin. They predominantly describe India, or mention the last Nanda emperor, who usurped the throne of the king before him (Curtis, Diodorus, Plutarch). Justin states that Chandragupta was of humble origin, and includes stories of miraculous legends associated with him, such as a wild elephant appearing and submitting itself to him as a ride to him before a battle. Justin's text states that Chandragupta "achieved [India's] freedom", and "aspired to royalty by all men," as he offended Nanda and was ordered to death, but saved himself "by a speedy flight."

Plutarch states that Chandragupta, as a young man, saw Alexander the Great. He is described as a great king, but not as great in power and influence as Porus in northwestern India or Agrammes (Dhana Nanda) in eastern India.

The Brahmanical Puranic texts do not discuss the details of Chandragupta's ancestry, but rather cover the ancestry of the last Nanda king, and the restoration of just rule by Kautilya (Chanakya; the identification with Kautilya, the author of the Arthashastra, dates from a later period). The Nanda king is described to be cruel, against dharma and shastras, and born out of an illicit relationship followed by a coup. According to Mookerji, the Arthasastra refers to the Nanda rule as against the spiritual, cultural, and military interests of the country, a period where intrigue and vice multiplied. In a later addition, the Arthasastra states that the text was written by him who returned dharma, nurtured diversity of views, and ruled virtuously that kindled love among the subjects for his rule, an insertion linking the Guptas to the Mauryans.

Buddhist texts such as Mahavamsa describe Chandragupta to be of Kshatriya origin. These sources, written about seven centuries after his dynasty ended, state that both Chandragupta and his grandson Ashoka – a patron of Buddhism – were Moriyas, a branch of Gautama Buddha's Shakya noble family. These Buddhist sources attempt to link the dynasty of their patron Ashoka directly to the Buddha. The sources claim that the family branched off to escape persecution from a King of Kosala and Chandragupta's ancestors moved into a secluded Himalayan kingdom known for its peacocks. The Buddhist sources explain the epithet maurya comes from these peacocks, or Mora in Pali (Sanskrit: Mayura). The Buddhist texts are inconsistent; some offer other legends to explain his epithet. For example, they mention a city named "Moriya-nagara" where all buildings were made of bricks colored like the peacock's neck. The Maha-bodhi-vasa states he hailed from Moriya-nagara, while the Digha-Nikaya states he came from the Maurya clan of Pipphalivana. The Buddhist sources also mention that "Brahmin Chanakya" was his counselor and with whose support Chandragupta became the king at Patliputra. He has also been controversially linked with Sisikottus (or Śaśigupta, which has same etymology as of Chandragupta), an Indian dynast appointed by Alexander in Paropamisadae, on the account of similar names.

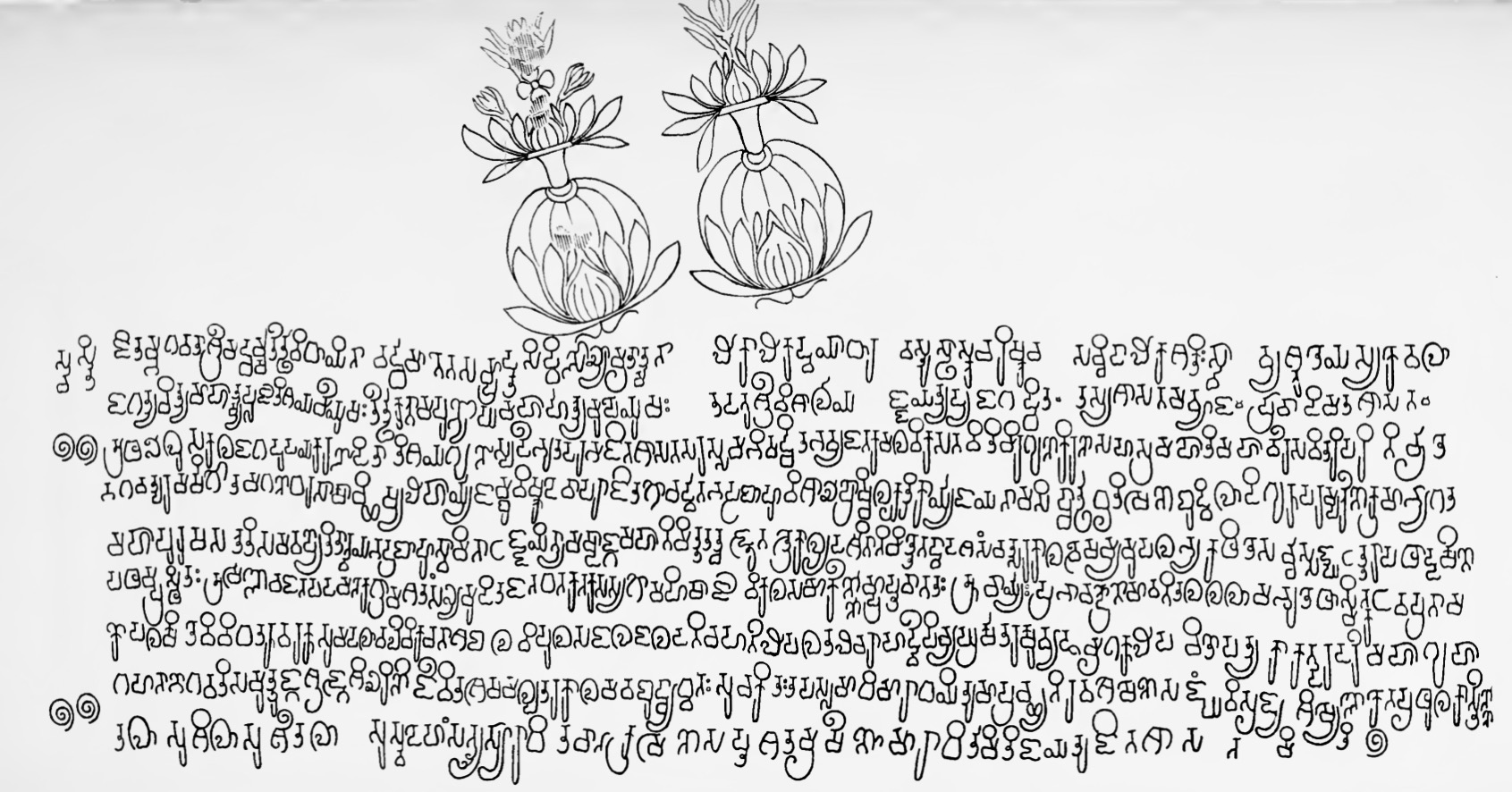
7th-century Bhadrabahu inscription at Shravanabelagola (Sanskrit, Purvahale Kannada script). This is the oldest inscription at the site, and it mentions Bhadrabahu and Prabhacandra. Lewis Rice and Digambara Jains interpret Prabhacandra to be Chandragupta Maurya, while others such as J F Fleet, V. R. Ramachandra Dikshitar, and Svetambara Jains state this interpretation is wrong.

The 12th-century Digambara text Parishishtaparvan by Hemachandra is the main and earliest Jain source of the complete legend of Chandragupta. It was written nearly 1,400 years after Chandragupta's death. Canto 8, verses 170 to 469, describes the legend of Chandragupta and Chanakya's influence on him. Other Digambara Jain sources state he moved to Karnataka after renouncing his kingdom and performed Sallekhana – the Jain religious ritual of peacefully welcoming death by fasting. The earliest mention of Chandragupta's ritual death is found in Harisena's Brhatkathakosa, a Sanskrit text of stories about Digambara Jains. The Brhatkathakosa describes the legend of Bhadrabahu and mentions Chandragupta in its 131st story. However, the story makes no mention of the Maurya Empire, and mentions that his disciple Chandragupta lived in and migrated from Ujjain – a kingdom (northwest Madhya Pradesh) about a thousand kilometers west of the Magadha and Patliputra (central Bihar). This has led to the proposal that Harisena's Chandragupta may be a later era, different person.

== Biographical information ==
=== Date ===
None of the ancient texts mention when Chandragupta was born. Plutarch claims that Chandragupta in his youth saw Alexander the Great during the latter's invasion of India (c. 326–325 BCE):

Androcottus [Chandragupta], when he was a stripling, saw Alexander himself, and we are told that he often said in later times that Alexander narrowly missed making himself master of the country, since its king was hated and despised on account of his baseness and low birth.

Assuming the Plutarch account is true, Raychaudhuri proposed in 1923 that Chandragupta may have been born after 350 BCE. There is also a passage of Justin's history which had been read as referring to a meeting between Chandragupta and Alexander. However, according to Thomas Trautmann, this was a due to mistranslation in early printed book, and the correct reading was Nandrum (Nanada king), rather than Alexandrum.

Some early printed editions of Justin's work wrongly mentioned "Alexandrum" instead of "Nandrum"; this error was corrected in philologist J. W. McCrindle's 1893 translation. In the 20th century, historians Hem Chandra Raychaudhuri and R. C. Majumdar believed "Alexandrum" to be correct reading, and theorized that Justin refers to a meeting between Chandragupta and Alexander the Great ("Alexandrum"). However, this is incorrect: research by historian Alfred von Gutschmid in the preceding century had clearly established that "Nandrum" is the correct reading supported by multiple manuscripts: only a single defective manuscript mentions "Alexandrum" in the margin.

According to other Greco-Roman texts, Chandragupta attacked the Greek-Indian governors during a period of unrest and local warfare after Alexander's death (died c. 323 BCE), acquiring control of the eastern Indus Valley. The chronology and dating of Chandragupta's activities in the Punjab is uncertain, either before or after he took the Nanda-throne. The defeat of the Greeks is dated by Mookerji at 323; Jansari dates the arrival of Chandragupta in the Punjab at c. 317, in line with the chronology of Greek history.

The texts do not include the start or end year of Chandragupta's reign. According to some Hindu and Buddhist texts, Chandragupta ruled for 24 years. The Buddhist sources state Chandragupta Maurya ruled 162 years after the death of the Buddha. However, the Buddha's birth and death vary by source and all these lead to a chronology that is significantly different from the Greco-Roman records. Similarly, Jain sources composed give different gaps between Mahavira's death and his accession. As with the Buddha's death, the date of Mahavira's death itself is also a matter of debate, and the inconsistencies and lack of unanimity among the Jain authors cast doubt on Jain sources. This Digambara Jain chronology, also, is not reconcilable with the chronology implied in other Indian and non-Indian sources.

Historians such as Irfan Habib and Vivekanand Jha assign Chandragupta's reign to c. 322–298 BCE. Upinder Singh dates his rule from 324 or 321 BCE to 297 BCE. Kristi Wiley states he reigned between 320 and 293 BCE. Jansari, admitting that c.320/319 is the date conventionally accepted by most scholars, follows Cribb in re-assessing Justin (XV section 4.12-22), who states that Chandragupta's became "'ruler of India' when Seleucus was 'laying the foundations' of his own empire." According to Jansari, "this reference appears to refer to the period c.311– c.308," implying that "Chandragupta gained power, and was possibly already the first Mauryan king, between c.311 and c.305 BCE."

Chandragupta and Seleucus Nicator entered into a dynastic marriage-alliance at c. 305–303 BCE.

The circumstances and year of Chandragupta's death are also unclear and disputed. According to Roy, Chandragupta's abdication of throne may be dated to c. 298 BCE, and his death between 297 and 293 BCE.

=== Name ===
Greek writer Phylarchus (c. third century BCE), who is quoted by Athenaeus, calls Chandragupta "Sandrokoptos". The later Greco-Roman writers Strabo, Arrian, and Justin (c. second century) call him "Sandrocottus". In Greek and Latin accounts, Chandragupta is known as Sandrakottos (Greek: Σανδράκοττος) and Androcottus (Greek: Ανδροκόττος).

British orientialist and philologist Sir William Jones (1746–1794) was the first to propose, in 1793, that Chandragupta Maurya known from the Sanskrit literature must be equivalent to the Indian king known as "Sandracottus" in Graeco-Roman historical sources. Jones' discovery "was of vital importance," states historian Sushma Jansari, because "it meant, for the first time, that Indian and Graeco-Roman history could be synchronised and dates assigned to this period of ancient Indian history." Consequently, Chandragupta's reign has been referred to as "the sheet anchor of Indian chronology."

=== Titles ===
The king's epithets mentioned in the Sanskrit play Mudrarakshasa include "Chanda-siri" (Chandra-shri), "Piadamsana" (Priya-darshana), and Vrishala. Piadamsana is similar to Priyadasi, an epithet of his grandson Ashoka. The word "Vrishala" is used in Indian epics and law books to refer to non-orthodox people. According to one theory, it may be derived from the Greek royal title Basileus, but there is no concrete evidence of this: the Indian sources apply it to several non-royals, especially wandering teachers and ascetics. Chandragupta also received the epithet "Sandrokottos the Great" (Σανδροκόττος ο Μέγας) after decisively defeating the Seleucid Empire.

=== Religion ===
In contrast to the Jain legends that developed about 900 years later and state that Chandragupta died as a Jain, contemporary Greek evidence states that Chandragupta consumed wine and continued to perform Brahminical rituals and offerings (Yajna) and animal sacrifices (Bali) strictly associated with Vedic Brahminism; and he delighted in hunting and otherwise leading a life at odds with the Jain practice of ahimsa or nonviolence towards living beings. (Note: The authors and their affiliations listed in the title page of An Advanced History of India are: R. C. Majumdar, M.A., Ph.D. Vice-Chancellor, Dacca University; H. C. Raychaudhuri, M.A., Ph.D., Carmichael Professor of Ancient Indian History and Culture, Calcutta University; and Kalikinkar Datta, M.A., Ph.D. Premchand Raychand Scholar, Mount Medallist, Griffith Prizeman, Professor and Head of the Department of History, Patna College, Patna) There are no contemporary sources or evidence that agree with the popular story of Chandragupta converting to Jainism in his later life. Even some Śvetāmbara analyses suggest later Digambara legends may have conflated Chandragupta Maurya with a later Mauryan figure, such as Samprati Chandragupta (who is known as the "Jain Ashoka").

== Biography ==
=== Historical background ===
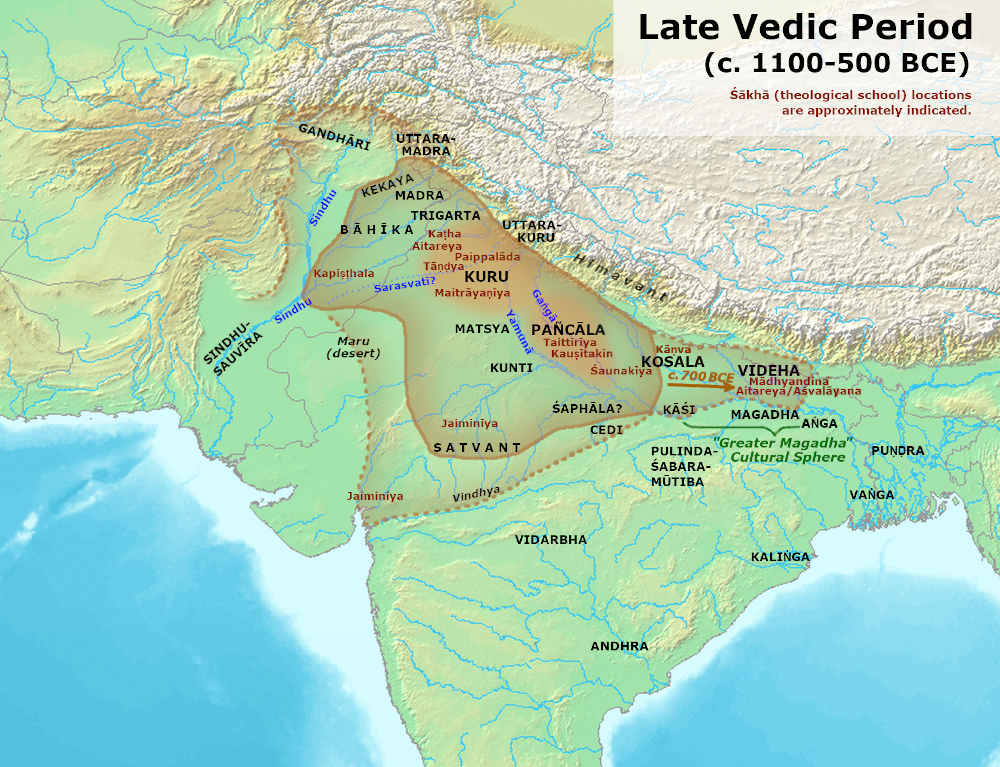
Late Vedic era map showing the boundaries of Āryāvarta with Janapadas in northern India. Beginning of Iron Age kingdoms in India—Kuru, Panchala, Kosala, Videha.

Around 350 BCE, Magadha, ruled by the Nanda dynasty, emerged as the dominant power after a "process of internecine warfare" between the janapadas.

Alexander the Great entered the Northwest Indian subcontinent in his Indian campaign, which he ended in 325 BCE due to a mutiny prompted by the prospect of confronting another large empire, presumably the Nanda Empire, and before Chandragupta came into power. Alexander left India, and assigned the northwestern (Indus Valley) Indian subcontinent territories to Greek governors. He died in Babylon in 323 BCE after which war broke out between his generals.

=== Early life ===
==== Family background ====
There is no historical information on Chandragupta's youth. One medieval commentator states Chandragupta to be the son of one of the Nanda's wives with the name Mura. Other narratives describe Mura as a concubine of the king. Another Sanskrit dramatic text Mudrarakshasa uses the terms Vrishala and Kula-Hina (meaning - "not descending from a recognized clan or family") to describe Chandragupta. The word Vrishala has two meanings: one is the son of a shudra; the other means the best of kings. A later commentator used the former interpretation to posit that Chandragupta had a Shudra background. However, historian Radha Kumud Mukherjee opposed this theory, and stated that the word should be interpreted as "the best of kings". The same drama also refers to Chandragupta as someone of humble origin, like Justin. According to the 11th-century texts of the Kashmiri Hindu tradition – Kathasaritsagara and Brihat-Katha-Manjari – the Nanda lineage was very short. Chandragupta was a son of Purva-Nanda, the older Nanda based in Ayodhya. (Note: According to Roy (2012, pp. 61–62), Chandragupta Maurya was a Shudra lineage, king.) The common theme in the Hindu sources is that Chandragupta came from a humble background and with Chanakya, he emerged as a dharmic king loved by his subjects.

==== Chanakya ====
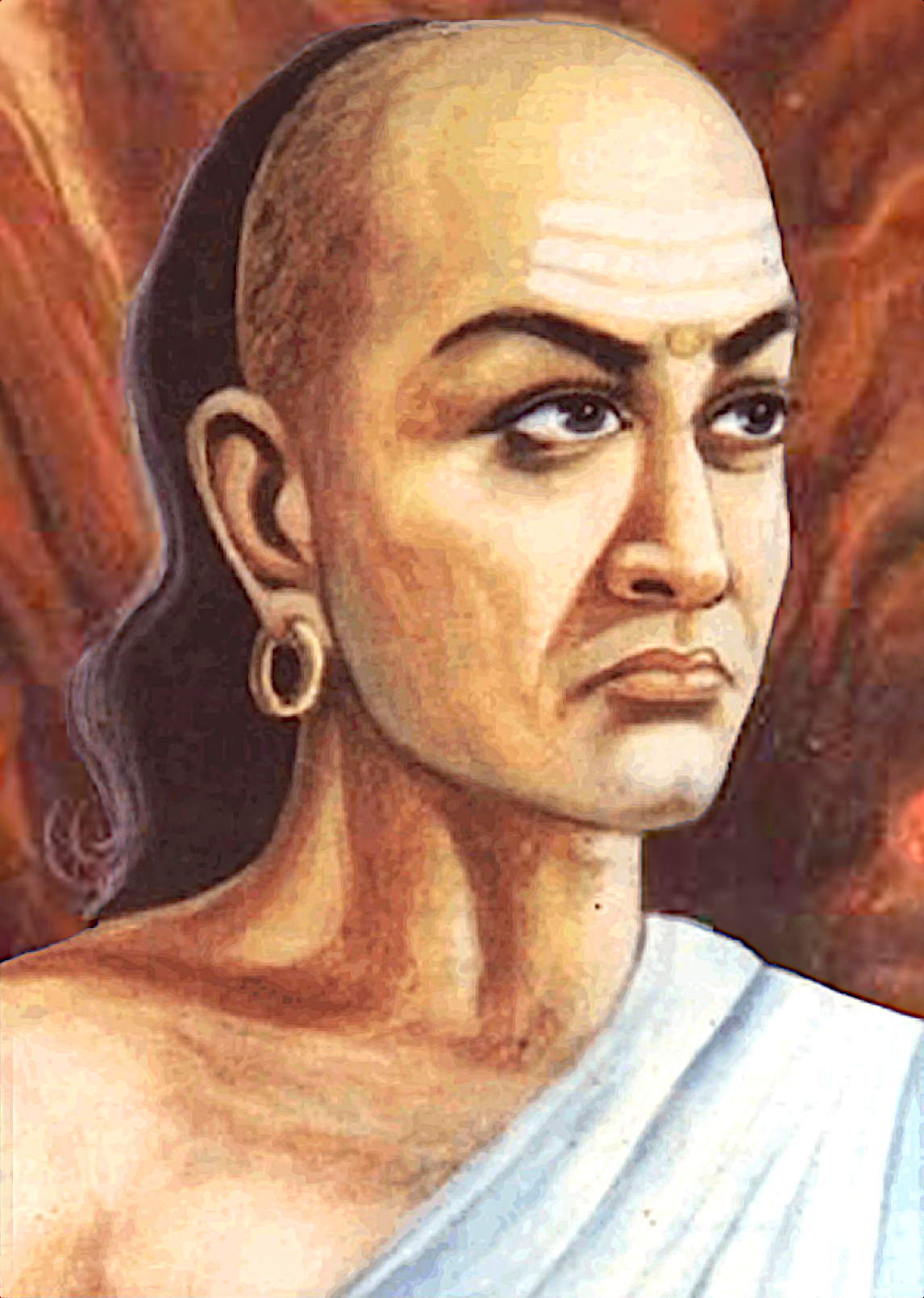
Chandragupta's guru was Chanakya, with whom he studied as a child and with whose counsel he built the Empire. This image is a 1915 attempt at depicting Chanakya.

Legends about Chanakya couple him to Chandragupta, acting as his mentor and spiritual teacher, complementing the image of a chakravartin. (Note: Compare the origin of the Vijayanagara Empire and the role of Vidyaranya.)

According to the Digambara legend by Hemachandra, Chanakya was a Jain layperson and a Brahmin. When Chanakya was born, Jain monks prophesied that Chanakya will one day grow up to help make someone an emperor and will be the power behind the throne. Chanakya believed in the prophecy and fulfilled it by agreeing to help the daughter of a peacock-breeding community chief deliver a baby boy. In exchange, he asked the mother to give up the boy and let him adopt him at a later date. The Jain Brahmin then went about making money through magic, and returned later to claim young Chandragupta, whom he taught and trained. Together, they recruited soldiers and attacked the Nanda Empire. Eventually, they won and proclaimed Patliputra as their capital.

The Buddhist and Hindu legends present different versions of how Chandragupta met Chanakya. Broadly, they mention young Chandragupta creating a mock game of a royal court that he and his shepherd friends played near Vinjha forest. Chanakya saw him give orders to the others, bought him from the hunter, and adopted Chandragupta. Chanakya taught and admitted him in Taxila to study the Vedas, military arts, law, and other shastras.

According to the Buddhist legend, Chanakya was chosen as president of the samgha which administered the Danasala, a charity foundation, but was dismissed by Dhana Nanda due to his ugliness and manners. Chanaky cursed the king, fled Pataliputra, and then met Chandragupta.

=== Rise to power ===
==== Unrest and warfare in the Punjab ====
The Roman historian Justin (2nd Century CE) states, in Epit. 15.4.12-13, that after Alexander's death, Greek governors in India were assassinated, liberating the people of Greek rule. This revolt led by Chandragupta, who in turn established an oppressive regime himself "after taking the throne":

India, after the death of Alexander, had assassinated his prefects, as if shaking the burden of servitude. The author of this liberation was Sandracottos [Chandragupta], but he had transformed liberation in servitude after victory, since, after taking the throne, he himself oppressed the very people he has liberated from foreign domination."

— Junianus Justinus, Histoires Philippiques Liber, XV.4.12-13

Raychaudhuri states that, according to Justin Epitome 15.4.18–19, Chandragupta organized an army. He notes that early translators interpreted Justin's original expression as "body of robbers", but states Raychaudhuri, the original expression used by Justin may mean mercenary soldier, hunter, or robber. Mookerji refers to McCrindle as stating that "robbers" refers to the people of the Punjab, "kingless people." Mookerju further quotes Rhys Davids, who states that "it was from the Punjab that Chandragupta recruited the nucleus of the force with which he besieged and conquered Dhana-Nanda."

The nature of early relationship between these governors and Chandragupta is unknown. According to Habib & Jha, Justin mentions Chandragupta as a rival of the Alexander's successors in north-western India. Alain Daniélou further explains:

In the Swat, Nicanor was killed. Philip, who was guarding Taxila with Ambhi, replaced Nicanor as satrap of Gandhara, but was himself assassinated in 325 B.C.E.[...] Chandragupta began attacking the Greek principalities. The Brahmans fomented revolts against the unclean foreigners. Peithon withdrew to Arachosia (Kandahar) in 316. After treacherously killing an Indian prince probably Ambhi. Eudemus left India with one hundred and twenty elephants to join Eumenes army. He was beaten and put to death with Eumenes by Antigonus, king of Babylon. It took no great effort for Chandragupta to annex the Greek kingdoms, which had prepared the terrain for him.

According to Mookerji, the Buddhist text Mahavamsa Tika describes how Chandragupta and Chanakya raised an army by recruiting soldiers from many places after the former completed his education at Taxila, to resist the Greeks. Chanakya made Chandragupta the leader of the army. The Digambara Jain text Parishishtaparvan states that this army was raised by Chanakya with coins he minted and an alliance formed with Parvataka. According to Nath Sen, Chandragupta recruited and annexed local military republics such as the Yaudheyas that had resisted Alexander's Empire.

The chronology and dating of Chandragupta's activities in the Punjab is uncertain. This may be either before or after he took the Nanda-throne. The defeat of the Greeks is dated by Mookerji at 323 BCE; Jansari dates the arrival of Chandragupta in the Punjab at c. 317, in line with the chronology of Greek history.

==== Offense of the Nanda-king and flight ====
According to Justin, Chandragupta offended the Nanda king ("Nandrum" or "Nandrus") who ordered his execution. Mookerji quotes Justin as stating

Sandracottus (Chandragupta) was the leader who achieved its freedom. He was born in humble life but was prompted to aspire to royalty by an omen. By his insulent behaviour he had offended Nandrus (Note: Some early printed editions of Justin's work wrongly mentioned "Alexandrum" instead of "Nandrum"; this error was corrected in philologist J. W. McCrindle's 1893 translation. In the 20th century, historians Hem Chandra Raychaudhuri and R. C. Majumdar believed "Alexandrum" to be correct reading, and theorized that Justin refers to a meeting between Chandragupta and Alexander the Great ("Alexandrum"). However, this is incorrect: research by historian Alfred von Gutschmid in the preceding century had clearly established that "Nandrum" is the correct reading supported by multiple manuscripts: only a single defective manuscript mentions "Alexandrum" in the margin.) and was ordered to be put to death when he sought safety by a speedy flight.

Justin narrates two miraculous incidents as omens and portents of Sandracottus (Chandragupta) fate. In the first incident, when Chandragupta was asleep after having escaped from Nandrum, a big lion came up to him, licked him, and then left. In the second incident, when Chandragupta was readying for war with Alexander's generals, a huge wild elephant approached him and offered itself to be his steed.

The Mudrarakshasa states that Chanakya felt insulted by the king, whereafter he swore to destroy the Nanda dynasty. The Jain version states that it was the Nanda king who was publicly insulted by Chanakya. In either case, Chanakya fled, found Chandragupta, and started a war against the Nanda king.

==== War against the Nandas and seizure of Pataliputra ====
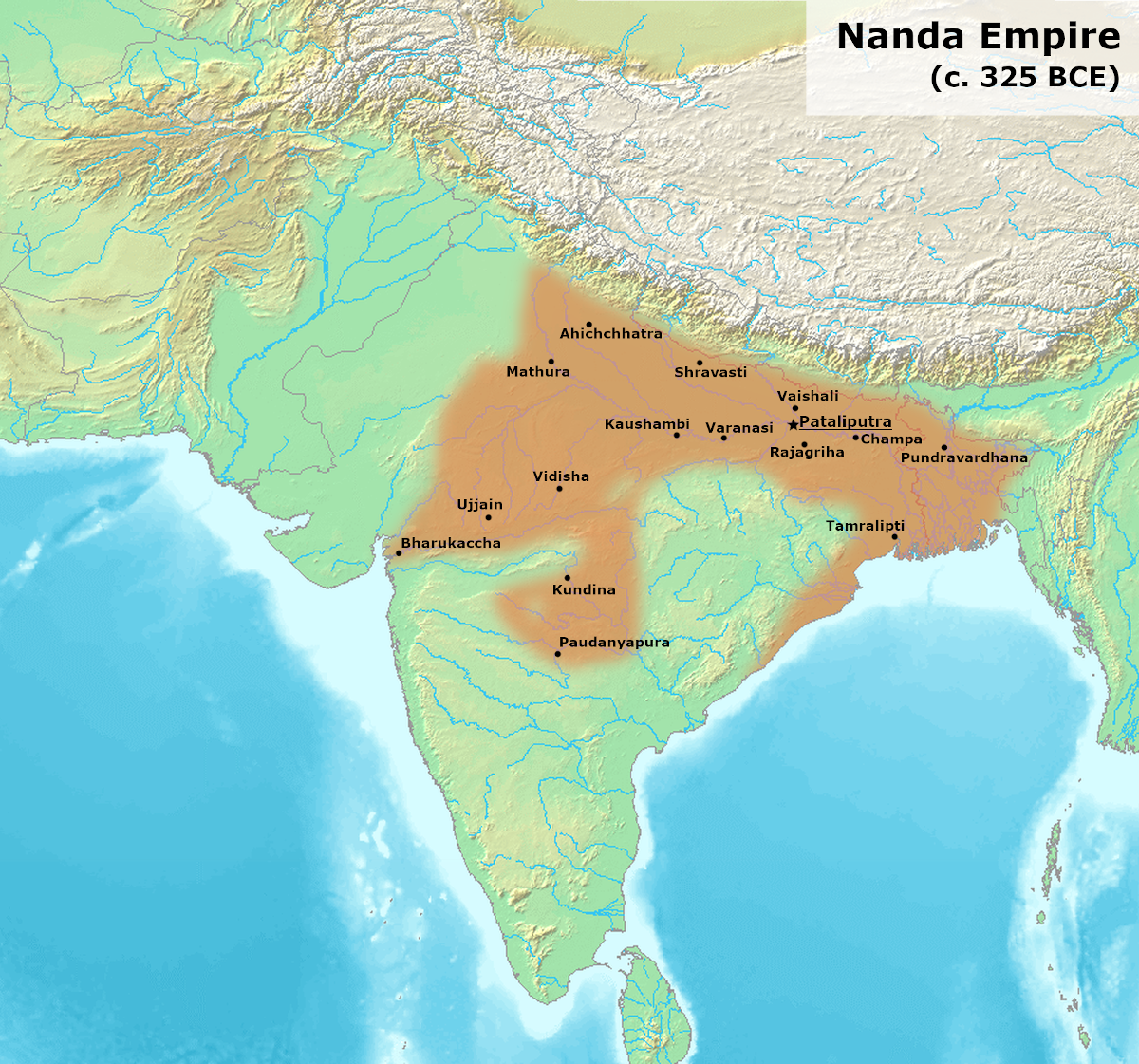
Nanda Empire, c. 325 BCE

According to Mookerji, after defeating the Greeks, the army of Chandragupta and Chanakya revolted against the unpopular Nandas and conquered the Nanda outer territories, and then advanced on Pataliputra, the capital city of the Nanda Empire, which according to Mookerji they conquered deploying guerrilla warfare methods with the help of mercenaries from conquered areas. With the defeat of Dhana Nanda, Chandragupta Maurya founded the Maurya Empire.

The Buddhist Mahavamsa Tika and Jain Parishishtaparvan records Chandragupta's army unsuccessfully attacking the Nanda capital. Chandragupta and Chanakya then began a campaign at the frontier of the Nanda empire, gradually conquering various territories on their way to the Nanda capital. He then refined his strategy by establishing garrisons in the conquered territories, and finally besieged the Nanda capital Pataliputra. There Dhana Nanda accepted defeat. In contrast to the easy victory in Buddhist sources, the Hindu and Jain texts state that the campaign was bitterly fought because the Nanda dynasty had a powerful and well-trained army. These legends state that the Nanda emperor was defeated, deposed and exiled by some accounts, while Buddhist accounts claim he was killed.

Historically reliable details of Chandragupta's campaign into Pataliputra are unavailable and the legends written centuries later are inconsistent. While his victory, and ascension of the throne, is usually dated at c. 322–319 BCE, which would put his war in the Punjab after his ascension, an ascension "between c. 311–305 BCE" is also possible, placing his activity in the Punjab at c. 317 BCE.

The conquest was fictionalised in Mudrarakshasa, in which Chandragupta is said to have acquired Punjab, and then allied with a local king named Parvatka under the Chanakya's advice, where-after they advanced on Pataliputra. (Note: Bhattacharyya (1977, p. 8) states that the empire was built by a gradual conquest of provinces after the initial consolidation of Magadha.) (Note: Hemacandra (1998, pp. 176–177) notes that according to the Digambara Jain version by Hemachandra, the success of Chandragupta and his strategist Chanakya was stopped by a Nanda town that refused to surrender. Chanakya disguised himself as a mendicant and found seven mother goddesses (saptamatrikas) inside. He concluded these goddesses were protecting the town people. The townspeople sought the disguised mendicant's advice on how to end the blockade of the army surrounding their town. Hemacandra wrote Chanakya swindled them into removing the mother goddesses. The townspeople removed the protective goddesses and an easy victory over the town followed. Thereafter, the alliance of Chandragupta and Parvataka overran the Nanda empire and attacked Pataliputra with an "immeasurable army". With a depleted treasury, exhausted merit, and insufficient intelligence, the Nanda emperor lost.)

In contrast to the easy victory of Buddhist sources, the Hindu and Jain texts state that the campaign was bitterly fought because the Nanda dynasty had a powerful and well-trained army.Greco-Roman writer Plutarch stated, in his Life of Alexander, that the Nanda king was so unpopular that had Alexander tried, he could have easily conquered India. Buddhist texts such as Milindapanha claim Magadha was ruled by the Nanda dynasty, which, with Chanakya's counsel, Chandragupta conquered to restore dhamma.

Legends narrate that the Nanda emperor was defeated, but was allowed to leave Pataliputra alive with a chariot full of items his family needed. The Jain sources attest that his daughter fell in love at first sight with Chandragupta and married him.Though daughter is not named the source later name mother of Chandragupta's son as Durdhara.

=== Dynastic marriage-alliance with Seleucus ===
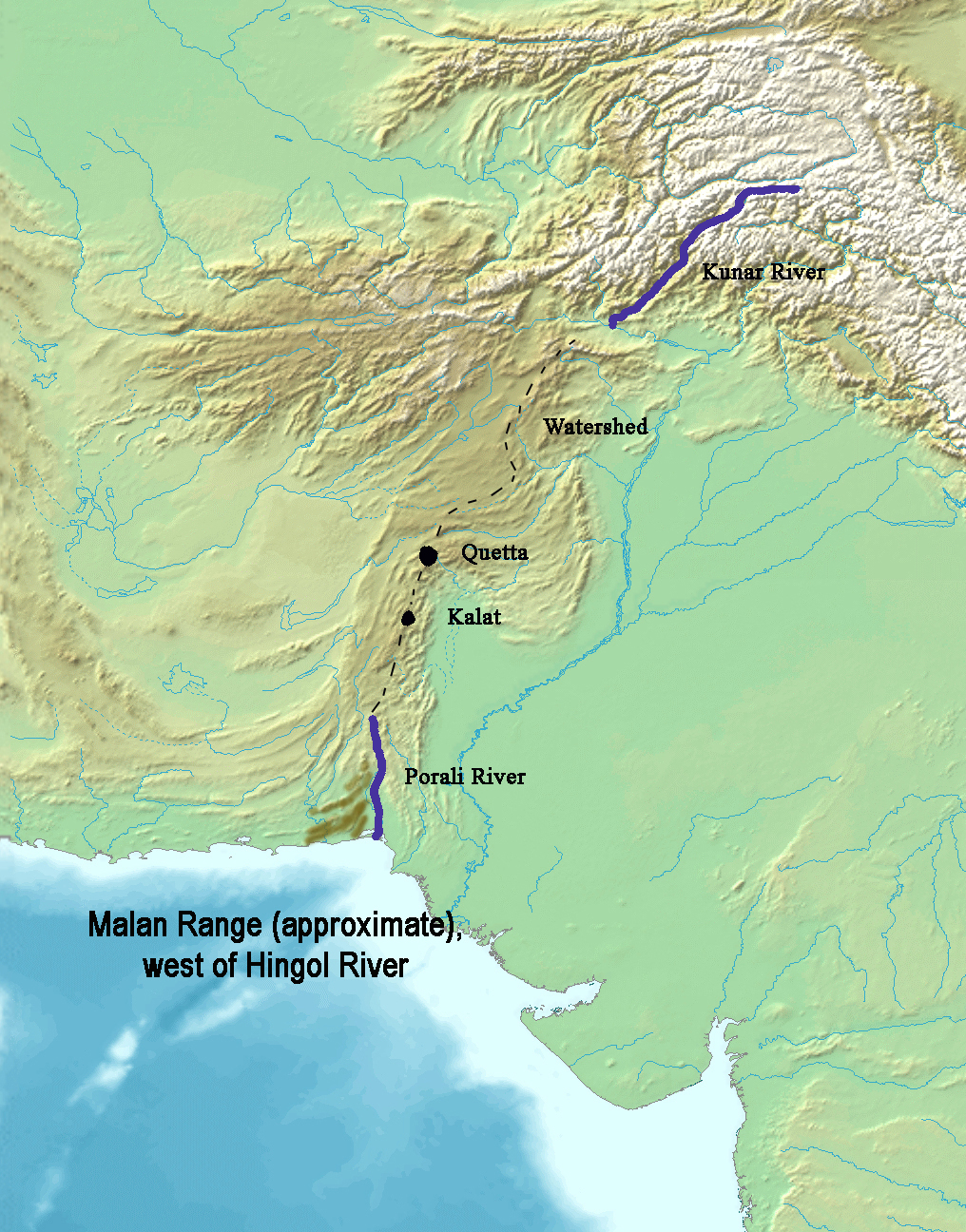
Malan Range and limit of ceded territory according to Tarn (1922)

According to Appian, Seleucus I Nicator, one of Alexander's Macedonian generals who in 312 BCE established the Seleucid Empire with its capital at Babylon, brought Persia and Bactria under his own authority, putting his eastern front facing the empire of Chandragupta.

Somewhere between 305 and 303 BCE Seleucus and Chandragupta confronted each other, Seleucus intending to retake the former satrapies each of the Indus. Yet, Seleucus Nicator and Chandragupta formed a dynastic marriage-alliance, Seleucus receiving five hundred elephants, and Chandragupta gaining control over the regions bordering at the east on the Indus. Strabo, in his Geographica, XV, 2.9 composed about 300 years after Chandragupta's death, describes a number of tribes living along the Indus, and then states that "The Indians occupy [in part] some of the countries situated along the Indus, which formerly belonged to the Persians."

The geographical position of the tribes is as follows: along the Indus are the Paropamisadae, above whom lies the Paropamisus Mountains: then, towards the south, the Arachoti: then next, towards the south, the Gedroseni, with the other tribes that occupy the seaboard; and the Indus lies, latitudinally, alongside all these places; and of these places, in part, some that lie along the Indus are held by Indians, although they formerly belonged to the Persians. Alexander [III 'the Great' of Macedon] took these away from the Arians and established settlements of his own, but Seleucus Nicator gave them to Sandrocottus [Chandragupta], upon terms of intermarriage and of receiving in exchange five hundred elephants.

The exact extent of the acquired territories is unknown. A modest interpretation limits the extension to the western Indus Valley, including the coast of eastern Gedrosia (Balochistan) up to the Malan mountain raing (Hingol river), the Punjab, (Note: Boesche (2003): "taking much of western India (the Punjab and the Sindh) from the Greeks and concluding a treaty with Seleucus") and the eastern part of Paropamisadae (Gandhara). Arachosia (Kandahar, present-day Afghanistan), is a possibility, while Aria (present-day Herat, Afghanistan) is also often mentioned, but rejected by contemporary scholarship. (Note: According to Grainger, Seleucus "must ... have held Aria" (Herat), and furthermore, his "son Antiochos was active there fifteen years later". (Grainger, John D. 1990, 2014. Seleukos Nikator: Constructing a Hellenistic Kingdom. Routledge. p. 109).) Tarn, writing in 1922, and Coningham and Young, have questioned the inclusion of eastern Afghanistan (Kabul-Kandahar), Coningham and Young noting that "a growing number of researchers would now agree that the Ashokan edicts may have represented 'an area of maximum contact rather than streamlined bureaucratic control'." Coningham & Young also question the extent of control over the lower Indus Valley, following Thapar, noting that this may have been an area of peripheral control. Raymond Allchin also notes the absence of major cities in the lower Indus valley.

The details of the engagement treaty are also not known. Since the extensive sources available on Seleucus never mention an Indian princess, it is thought that Chandragupta himself or his son Bindusara marrying a Seleucid princess, in accordance with contemporary Greek practices to form dynastic alliances. The Rajavamsa states that Chandragupta married a daughter of Seleucus I and Apama not long after the latter's defeat. As well, an Indian Puranic source, the Pratisarga Parva of the Bhavishya Purana, described the marriage of Chandragupta with a Greek ("Yavana") princess, daughter of Seleucus.

Chandragupta sent 500 war elephants to Seleucus, which played a key role in Seleucus' victory at the Battle of Ipsus. In addition to this treaty, Seleucus dispatched Megasthenes as an ambassador to Chandragupta's court, and later Antiochos sent Deimakos to his son Bindusara at the Maurya court at Patna.

Megasthenes served as a Greek ambassador in his court for four years.

=== Control of Gujarat ===
In the south-west, Chandragupta's rule over present-day Gujarat is attested to by Ashoka's inscription in Junagadh. On the same rock, about 400 years later, Rudradaman inscribed a longer text sometime about the mid second–century. Rudradaman's inscription states that the Sudarshana lake in the area was commissioned during the rule of Chandragupta through his governor Vaishya Pushyagupta and conduits were added during Ashoka's rule through Tushaspha. The Mauryan control of the region is further corroborated by the inscription on the rock, which suggests that Chandragupta controlled the Malwa region in Central India, located between Gujarat and Pataliputra.

=== Jain accounts of renunciation and retirement in Karnataka ===
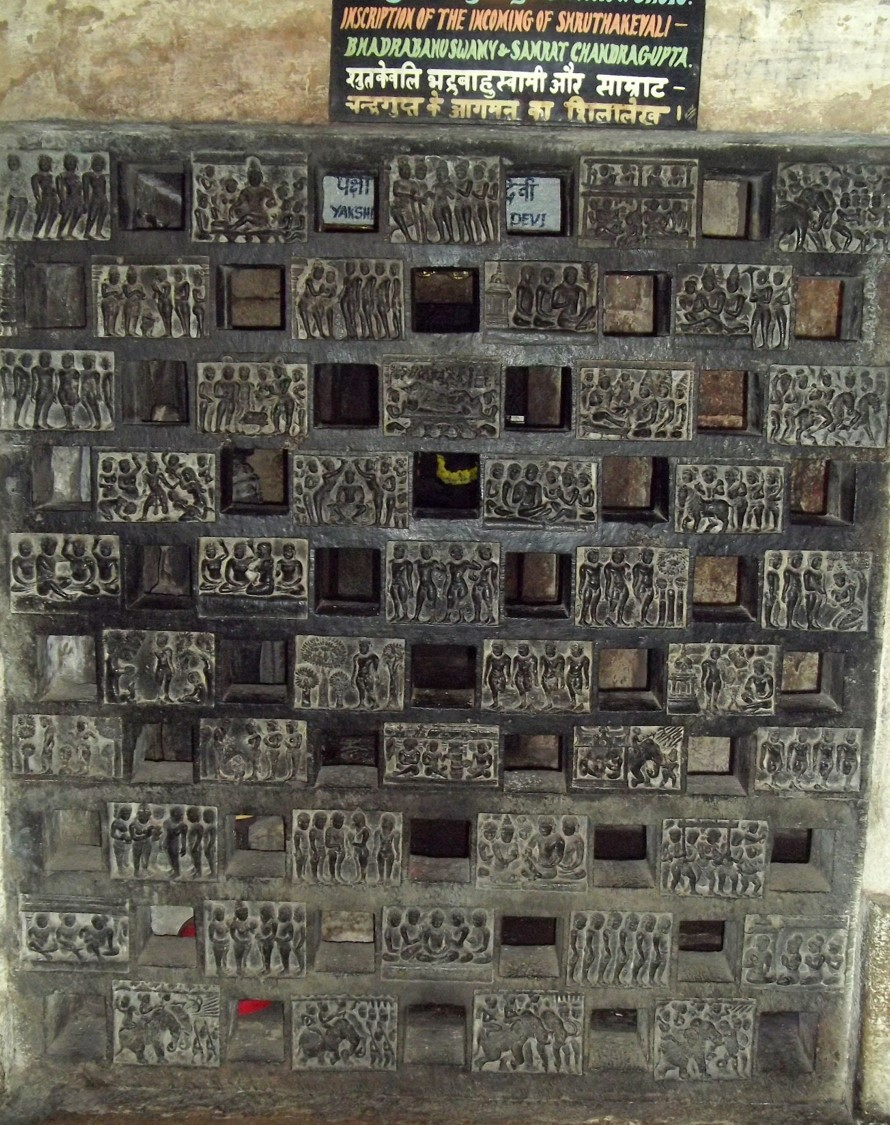
1,300-year-old Shravanabelagola relief shows death of Chandragupta after taking the vow of Sallekhana. Some consider it about the legend of his arrival with Bhadrabahu.

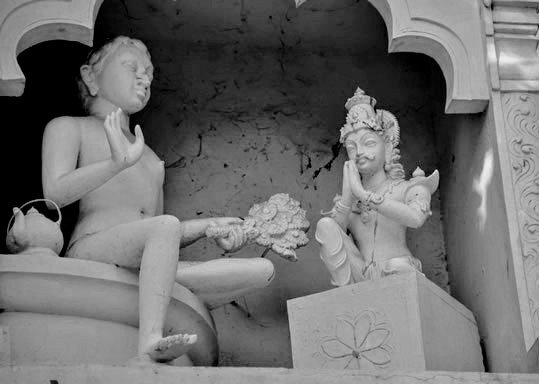
A statue depicting Chandragupta Maurya (right) with his spiritual mentor Acharya Bhadrabahu at Shravanabelagola

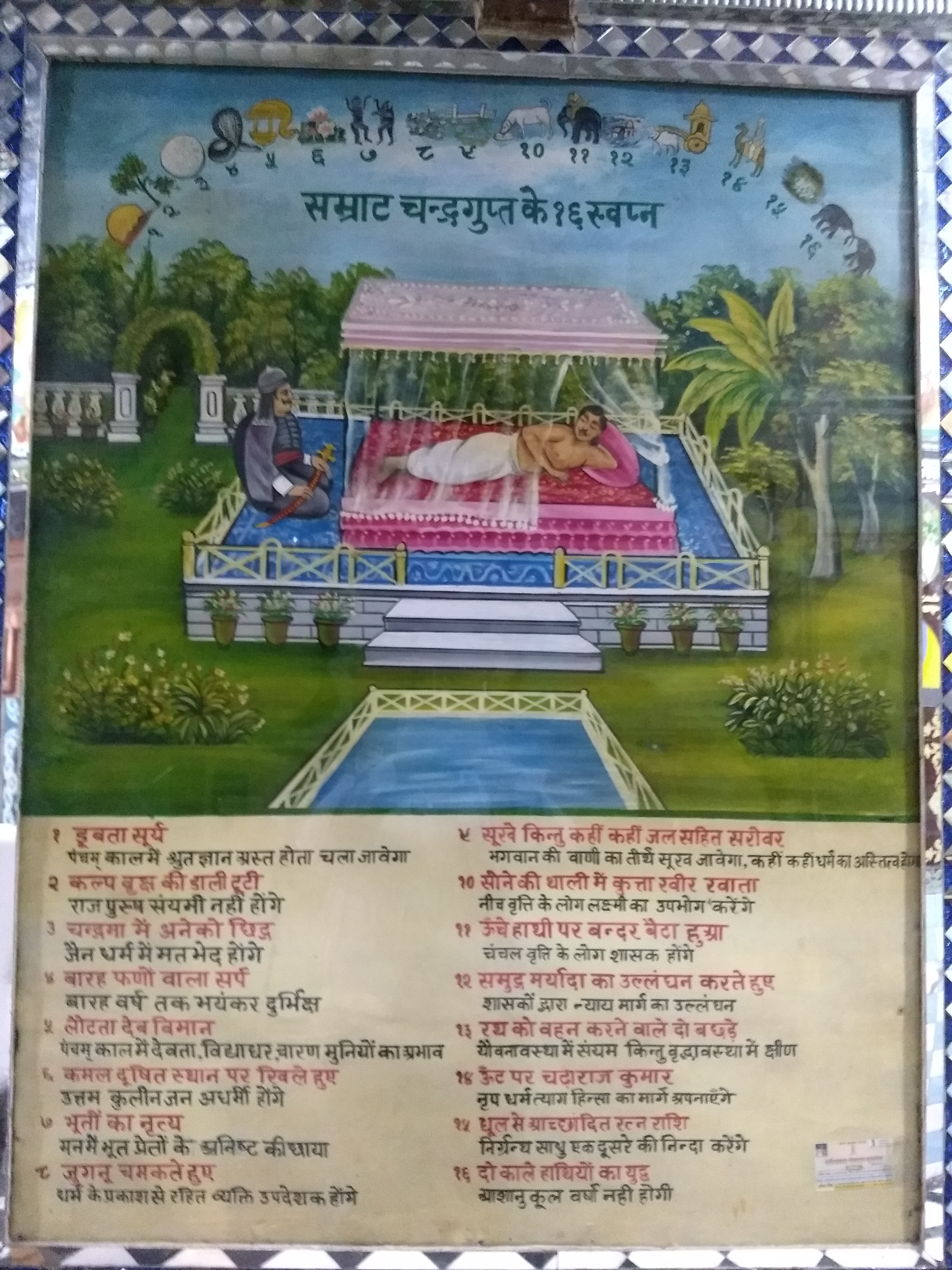
Chandragupta Maurya having 16 auspicious dreams in Jainism

According to Digambara Jain accounts Chandragupta abdicated at an early age and settled as a monk under Bhadrabāhu in Shravanabelagola, in present-day south Karnataka. According to these accounts, Bhadrabāhu forecast a 12-year famine because of all the killing and violence during the conquests by Chandragupta Maurya. He led a group of Jain monks to south India, where Chandragupta Maurya joined him as a monk after abdicating his empire to his son Bindusara. Together, states a Digambara legend, Chandragupta and Bhadrabahu moved to Shravanabelagola, in present-day south Karnataka. Chandragupta lived as an ascetic at Shravanabelagola for several years before fasting to death as per the practice of sallekhana, according to the Digambara legend. In accordance with the Digambara tradition, the hill on which Chandragupta is stated to have performed asceticism is now known as Chandragiri hill, and Digambaras believe that Chandragupta Maurya erected an ancient temple that now survives as the Chandragupta basadi.

The 12th-century Svetambara Jain legend by Hemachandra presents a different picture. The Hemachandra version includes stories about Jain monks who could become invisible to steal food from imperial storage and the Jain Brahmin Chanakya using violence and cunning tactics to expand Chandragupta's empire and increase imperial revenues. It states in verses 8.415 to 8.435, that for 15 years as emperor, Chandragupta was a follower of non-Jain "ascetics with the wrong view of religion" and "lusted for women". Chanakya, who was a Jain convert himself, persuaded Chandragupta to convert to Jainism by showing that Jain ascetics avoided women and focused on their religion. The legend mentions Chanakya aiding the premature birth of Bindusara, It states in verse 8.444 that "Chandragupta died in meditation (can possibly be sallekhana.) and went to heaven". According to Hemachandra's legend, Chanakya also performed sallekhana.

==== Textual sources ====
The Digambara Jain accounts are recorded in the Brihakathā kośa (931 CE) of Harishena, Bhadrabāhu charita (1450 CE) of Ratnanandi, Munivaṃsa bhyudaya (1680 CE) and Rajavali kathe,

Regarding the inscriptions describing the relation of Bhadrabahu and Chandragupta Maurya, Radha Kumud Mookerji writes,

The oldest inscription of about 600 AD associated "the pair (yugma), Bhadrabahu along with Chandragupta Muni." Two inscriptions of about 900 AD on the Kaveri near Seringapatam describe the summit of a hill called Chandragiri as marked by the footprints of Bhadrabahu and Chandragupta munipati. A Shravanabelagola inscription of 1129 mentions Bhadrabahu "Shrutakevali", and Chandragupta who acquired such merit that he was worshipped by the forest deities. Another inscription of 1163 similarly couples and describes them. A third inscription of the year 1432 speaks of Yatindra Bhadrabahu, and his disciple Chandragupta, the fame of whose penance spread into other words.

Along with texts, several Digambara Jain inscriptions dating from the 7th–15th century refer to Bhadrabahu and a Prabhacandra. Later Digambara tradition identified the Prabhacandra as Chandragupta, and some modern era scholars have accepted this Digambara tradition while others have not, Several of the late Digambara inscriptions and texts in Karnataka state the journey started from Ujjain and not Patliputra (as stated in some Digambara texts).

==== Analysis of the Jain sources ====
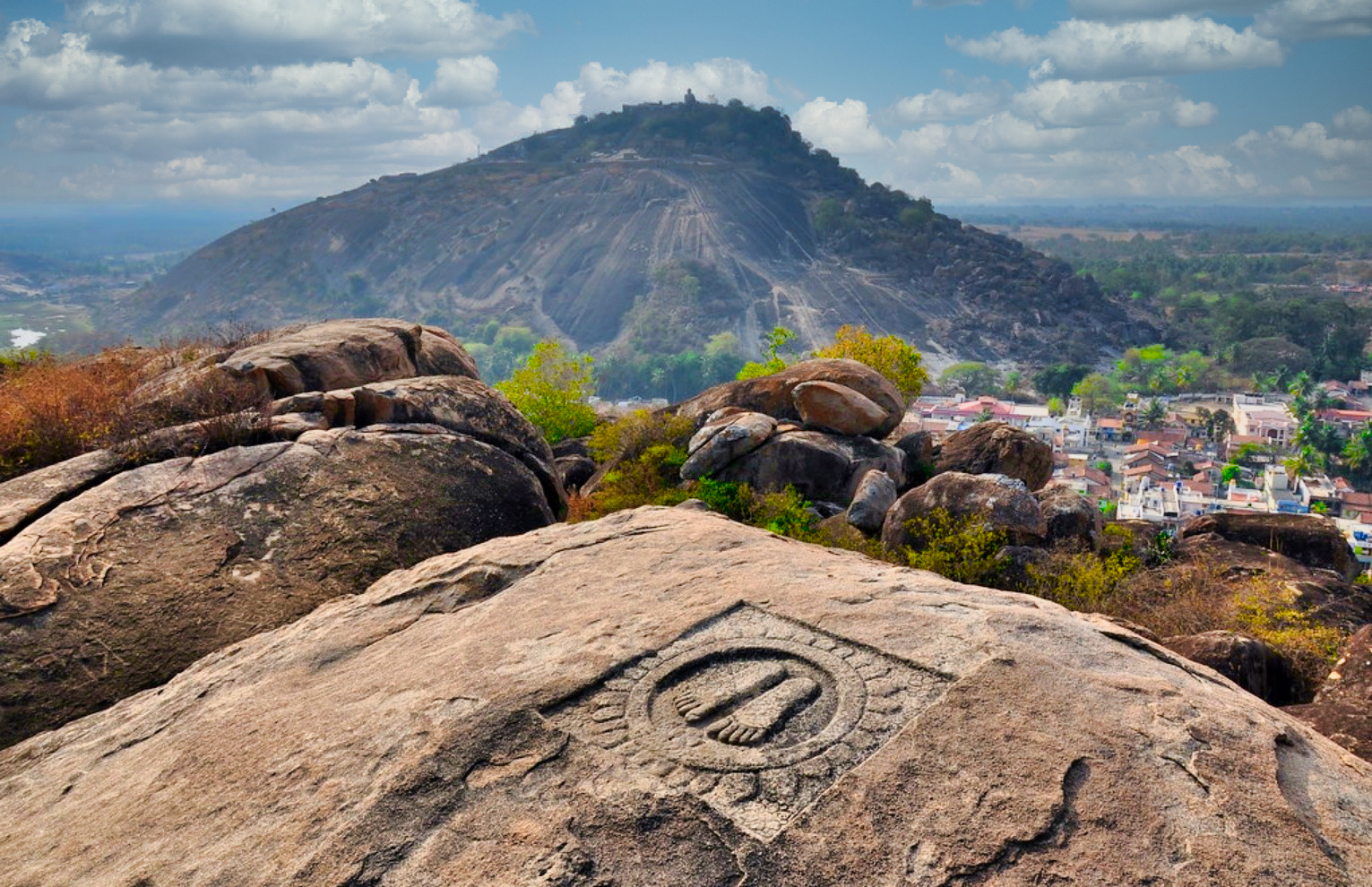
The Footprints of Chandragupta Maurya on Chandragiri Hill, where Chandragupta (the unifier of India and founder of the Maurya Dynasty) performed Sallekhana

According to Jeffery D. Long, in one Digambara version it was Samprati Chandragupta who renounced, migrated and performed sallekhana in Shravanabelagola. Long notes that scholars attribute the disintegration of the Maurya empire to the times and actions of Samprati Chandragupta, the grandson of Ashoka and great-great-grandson of Chandragupta Maurya, concluding that the two Chandraguptas have been confused to be the same in some Digambara legends.

Scholar of Jain studies and Sanskrit Paul Dundas says the Svetambara tradition of Jainism disputes the ancient Digambara legends. According to a fifth-century text of the Svetambara Jains, the Digambara sect of Jainism was founded 609 years after Mahavira's death, or in first-century CE. Digambaras wrote their own versions and legends after the fifth-century, with their first expanded Digambara version of sectarian split within Jainism appearing in the tenth-century. The Svetambaras texts describe Bhadrabahu was based near Nepalese foothills of the Himalayas in third-century BCE, who neither moved nor travelled with Chandragupta Maurya to the south; rather, he died near Patliputra, according to the Svetambara Jains.

According to V. R. Ramachandra Dikshitar – an Indologist and historian, several of the Digambara legends mention Prabhacandra, who had been misidentified as Chandragupta Maurya particularly after the original publication on Shravanabelagola epigraphy by B. Lewis Rice. The earliest and most important inscriptions mention Prabhacandra, which Rice presumed may have been the "clerical name assumed by Chadragupta Maurya" after he renounced and moved with Bhadrabahu from Patliputra. Dikshitar stated there is no evidence to support this and Prabhacandra was an important Jain monk scholar who migrated centuries after Chandragupta Maurya's death.

According to historian Sushma Jansari, "A closer look at the evidence for Chandragupta's conversion to Jainism and his and Bhadrabāhu's association with Śravaṇa Beḷgoḷa reveals that it is both late and problematic. In addition, except for Jain sources, there is no evidence to support the view of Chandragupta's conversion and migration." Jansari concludes, "Overall, therefore, the evidence as it currently stands suggests that the story of Chandragupta's conversion to Jainism and abdication (if, indeed, he did abdicate), his migration southwards and his association (or otherwise) with Bhadrabāhu and the site of Śravaṇa Beḷgoḷa developed after c.600 AD."

Dikshitar has taken Rice's deduction of Chandragupta Maurya retiring and dying in Shravanabelagola as the working hypothesis, since no alternative historical information or evidence is available about Chandragupta's final years and death.

==== Assumed control of Southern India ====
There is uncertainty about the other conquests that Chandragupta may have achieved, especially in the Deccan region of southern India. At the time of his grandson Ashoka's ascension in c. 268 BCE, the empire extended up to present-day Karnataka in the south, so the southern conquests may be attributed to either Chandragupta or his son Bindusara.

According to Mookerji, Chandragupta expanded his empire into the south, referring to Plutarch, who stated that "Androcottus [...] with an army of six hundred thousand men overran and subdued all India." Mookerji notes that details are lacking, but argues that "there is reliable evidence for it in the inscriptions of Ashoka." Mookerji also refers to the Jain tradition that Chandragupta retired at Sravana Belgola, Karnakata, and to references in Tamil records.

According to Kulke and Rothermund, if the Jain tradition about Chandragupta ending his life as a renunciate in Karnakata is considered correct, it appears that Chandragupta initiated the southern conquest.

Yet, the Digambara Jain accounts are problematic. His conversion and retirement at Śravaṇa Beḷgoḷa with Bhadrabāhu are only attested in Digambara Jain sources, which developed after 600 CE. They may actually refer to Samprati Chandragupta the great-great-grandson of Chandragupta Maurya, and are contradicted by Svetambaras Jain texts, who situate Bhadrabahunear the Nepalese foothills of the Himalayas in third-century BCE, neither moving nor travelling with Chandragupta Maurya to the south. The Digambara legends may also have misidentified Prabhacandra, an important Jain monk scholar who migrated centuries after Chandragupta Maurya's death, as Chandragupta Maurya.

Two poetic anthologies from the Tamil Sangam literature corpus – Akananuru and Purananuru – allude to the Nanda rule and Maurya empire. For example, poems 69, 281 and 375 mention the army and chariots of the Mauryas, while poems 251 and 265 may be alluding to the Nandas. However, the poems dated between first-century BCE to fifth-century CE do not mention Chandragupta Maurya by name, and some of them could be referring to a different Moriya dynasty in the Deccan region in the fifth century CE. According to Upinder Singh, these poems may be mentioning Mokur and Koshar kingdoms of Vadugars (northerners) in Karnataka and Andhra Pradesh, with one interpretation being that the Maurya Empire had an alliance with these at some point of time.

== Empire ==
=== Administration ===
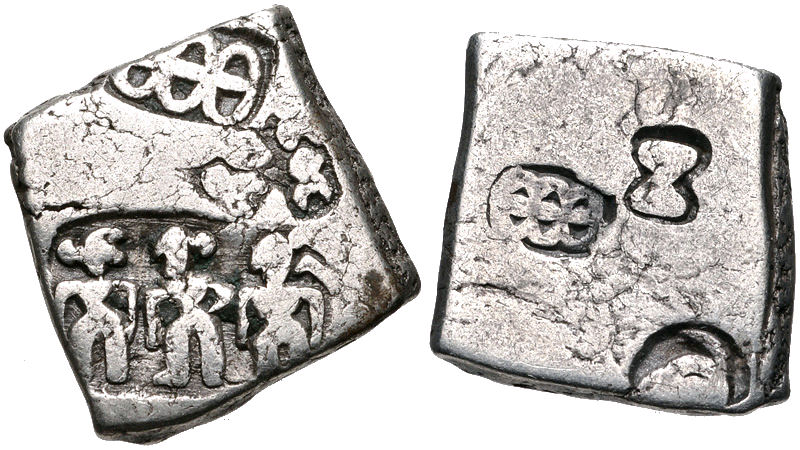
Chandragupta Maurya period Karshapana coin, circa 315–310 BCE

After conquering northern India, Chandragupta and Chanakya passed a series of major economic and political reforms. Chandragupta established a decentralised administration with provinces and local governments, and a mantriparishad (council of advisers) advising the king. While it is often thought that Chandragupta applied the statecraft and economic policies described in Arthashastra, which was earlierly thought to be written by his minister Chanakya but it's now thought by most scholars that the Arthashastra is not of Mauryan origin, and contains prescriptions which are incompatible with Chandragupta's reign.

The Maurya rule was a structured administration; Chandragupta had a council of ministers (amatya), with Chanakya was his chief minister. The empire was organised into territories (janapada), centres of regional power were protected with forts (durga), and state operations were funded with treasury (kosa). Strabo, in his Geographica composed about 300 years after Chandragupta's death, describes aspects of his rule in his chapter XV.46–69. He had councillors for matters of justice and assessors to collect taxes on commercial activity and trade goods. His officers inspected situations requiring law and order in the cities; the crime rate was low.

According to Megasthenes, Chandragupta's rule was marked by three parallel administrative structures. One managed the affairs of villages, ensuring irrigation, recording land ownership, monitoring tools supply, enforcing hunting, wood products and forest-related laws, and settling disputes. Another administrative structure managed city affairs, including all matters related to trade, merchant activity, visit of foreigners, harbors, roads, temples, markets, and industries. They also collected taxes and ensured standardized weights and measures. The third administrative body overlooked the military, its training, its weapons supply, and the needs of the soldiers.

Chanakya was concerned about Chandragupta's safety and developed elaborate techniques to prevent assassination attempts. Various sources report Chandragupta frequently changed bedrooms to confuse conspirators. He left his palace only for certain tasks: to go on military expeditions, to visit his court for dispensing justice, to offer sacrifices, for celebrations, and for hunting. During celebrations, he was well-guarded, and on hunts, he was surrounded by female guards who were presumed to be less likely to participate in a coup conspiracy. These strategies may have resulted from the historical context of the Nanda emperor who had come to power by assassinating the previous emperor.

During Chandragupta's reign and that of his dynasty, many religions thrived in India, with Buddhism, Jainism and Ajivika gaining prominence along with other folk traditions.

=== Infrastructure projects ===
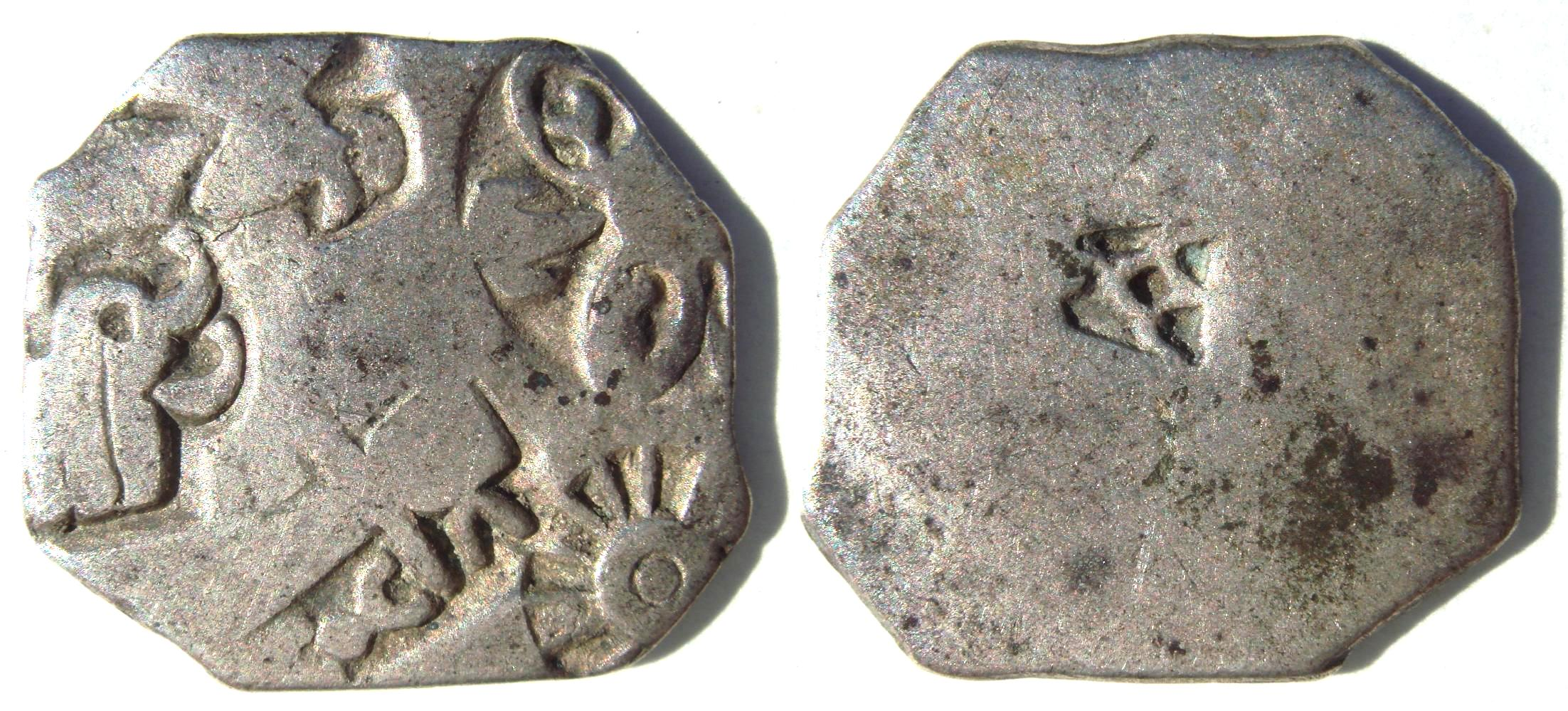
Silver punch mark coin (Karshapana) of the Maurya Empire, with symbols of wheel and elephant (3rd century BCE)

The empire built a strong economy from a solid infrastructure such as irrigation, temples, mines, and roads. Ancient epigraphical evidence suggests Chandragupta, under counsel from Chanakya, started and completed many irrigation reservoirs and networks across the Indian subcontinent to ensure food supplies for the civilian population and the army, a practice continued by his dynastic successors. Regional prosperity in agriculture was one of the required duties of his state officials.

The strongest evidence of infrastructure development is found in the Junagadh rock inscription of Rudradaman in Gujarat, dated to about 150 CE. It states, among other things, that Rudradaman repaired and enlarged the reservoir and irrigation conduit infrastructure built by Chandragupta and enhanced by Asoka. Chandragupta's empire also built mines, manufacturing centres, and networks for trading goods. His rule developed land routes to transport goods across the Indian subcontinent. Chandragupta expanded "roads suitable for carts" as he preferred those over narrow tracks suitable for only pack animals.

According to Kaushik Roy, the Maurya dynasty rulers were "great road builders". The Greek ambassador Megasthenes credited this tradition to Chandragupta after the completion of a thousand-mile-long highway connecting Chandragupta's capital Pataliputra in Bihar to Taxila in the north-west where he studied. The other major strategic road infrastructure credited to this tradition spread from Pataliputra in various directions, connecting it with Nepal, Kapilavastu, Dehradun, Mirzapur, Odisha, Andhra, and Karnataka. Roy stated this network boosted trade and commerce, and helped move armies rapidly and efficiently.

Chandragupta and Chanakya seeded weapon manufacturing centres, and kept them as a state monopoly of the state. The state, however, encouraged competing private parties to operate mines and supply these centres. They considered economic prosperity essential to the pursuit of dharma (virtuous life) and adopted a policy of avoiding war with diplomacy yet continuously preparing the army for war to defend its interests and other ideas in the Arthashastra.

=== Arts and architecture ===
The evidence of arts and architecture during Chandragupta's time is mostly limited to texts such as those by Megasthenese and Kautilya. The edict inscriptions and carvings on monumental pillars are attributed to his grandson Ashoka. The texts imply the existence of cities, public works, and prosperous architecture but the historicity of these is in question.

Archeological discoveries in the modern age, such as those Didarganj Yakshi discovered in 1917 buried beneath the banks of the Ganges suggest exceptional artisanal accomplishment. The site was dated to third century BCE by many scholars but later dates such as the Kushan era (1st-4th century CE) have also been proposed. The competing theories state that the art linked to Chandragupta Maurya's dynasty was learnt from the Greeks and West Asia in the years Alexander the Great waged war; or that these artifacts belong to an older indigenous Indian tradition. Frederick Asher of the University of Minnesota says "we cannot pretend to have definitive answers; and perhaps, as with most art, we must recognize that there is no single answer or explanation".

=== Religion ===
Chandragupta sponsored Vedic sacrifices and Brahmanical rituals, and hosted major festivals marked by procession of elephants and horses.

While many religions thrived within his realms and his descendants' empire, Buddhism, Jainism and Ājīvika gained prominence prevailing over Vedic and Brahmanistic traditions, initiating, under Ashoka, the expansion of Buddhism and the synthesis of Brahmanic and non-Brahmanic religious traditions which converged in Hinduism.

== Legacy ==
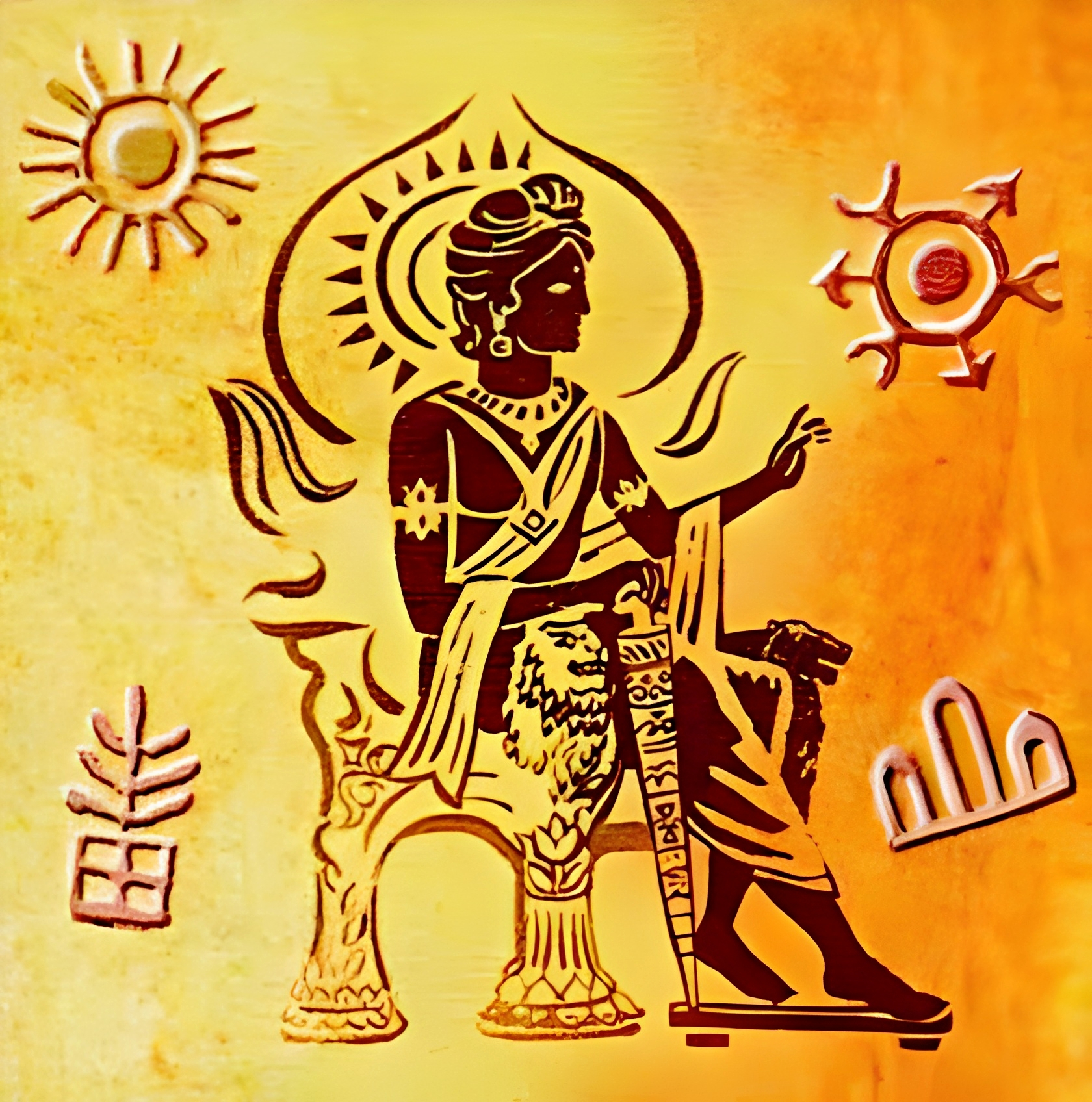
Chandragupta Maurya stamp issued by Indian Government in 2001

A memorial to Chandragupta exists on Chandragiri hill in Shravanabelagola, Karnataka. The Indian Postal Service issued a commemorative postage stamp honouring Chandragupta Maurya in 2001.

Historian Sushma Jansari notes that, in the 20th century, diverging views on Chandragupta have developed between western academics and Indian scholars. While westerners tend to take a reserved view on Chandragupta's accomplishments, Indian authors have portrayed Chandragupta as a very successful king who established the first Indian nation.

== In popular culture ==
- Mudrarakshasa ("The Signet Ring of Rakshasa") is a political drama in Sanskrit by Vishakhadatta composed 600 years after the conquest of Chandragupta – probably between 300 CE and 700 CE.
- D. L. Roy wrote a Bengali drama named Chandragupta based on the life of Chandragupta. The story of the play is loosely borrowed from the Puranas and the Greek history.
- Chanakya's role in the formation of the Maurya Empire is the essence of a historical/spiritual novel The Courtesan and the Sadhu by Dr. Mysore N. Prakash.
- Chandragupta is a 1920 Indian silent film about the Mauryan king.
- Chandragupta is a 1934 Indian film directed by Abdur Rashid Kardar.
- Chandraguptha Chanakya is an Indian Tamil-language historical drama film directed by C. K. Sachi, starring Bhavani K. Sambamurthy as Chandragupta.
- Samrat Chandragupta is a 1945 Indian historical film by Jayant Desai.
- Samrat Chandragupt is a 1958 Indian historical fiction film by Babubhai Mistry, a remake of the 1945 film. It stars Bharat Bhushan in the titular role of the emperor.
- The story of Chanakya and Chandragupta was made into a film in Telugu in 1977 titled Chanakya Chandragupta.
- The television series Chanakya is an account of the life and times of Chanakya, based on the play Mudrarakshasa.
- In 2011, a television series called Chandragupta Maurya was telecast on Imagine TV.
- In 2016, the television series Chandra Nandini was a fictionalized romance saga.
- In the 2016 video game Civilization VI, Chandragupta is a playable leader for the Indian civilization.
- In 2018, a television series called Chandragupta Maurya portrays the life of Chandragupta Maurya.
- Nobunaga the Fool, a Japanese stage play and anime, features a character named Chandragupta based on the emperor.
- In the 2001 film Aśoka, directed by Santosh Sivan, Bollywood director and producer Umesh Mehra played the role of Chandragupta Maurya.

== See also ==
- List of Indian monarchs
  - List of monarchs of Magadha
- Mauryan art
- Devavarman (Maurya)
- Dasharatha Maurya
- Samprati

== Sources ==
- Albinski, Henry S. (1958), "The Place of the Emperor Asoka in Ancient Indian Political Thought", Midwest Journal of Political Science, 2 (1): 62–75, doi:10.2307/2109166, JSTOR 2109166
- Allan, J (1958), The Cambridge Shorter History Of India, Cambridge University Press
- Allchin, F. R. (1995), "The Mauryan State and Empire", in Allchin, F. R.; Erdosy, George (eds.), The Archaeology of Early Historic South Asia: The Emergence of Cities and States, Cambridge University Press, ISBN 978-0-521-37695-2
- Allchin, F. R.; Erdosy, George (1995), The Archaeology of Early Historic South Asia: The Emergence of Cities and States, Cambridge University Press, ISBN 978-0-521-37695-2
- Appian, History of Rome, The Syrian Wars
- Asher, Frederick (2015), Brown, Rebecca M.; Hutton, Deborah S. (eds.), A Companion to Asian Art and Architecture, John Wiley & Sons, ISBN 978-1-119-01953-4
- Barua, Pradeep (2005), The State at War in South Asia, vol. 2, Nebraska Press, ISBN 9780803240612, "via Project MUSE (subscription required)"
- Bentley, Jerry (1993), Old World Encounters: Cross-Cultural Contacts and Exchanges in Pre-Modern Times, Oxford University Press
- Bhattacharyya, P. K. (1977), Historical Geography of Madhyapradesh from Early Records, Motilal Banarsidass
- Boesche, Roger (2003), "Kautilya's Arthaśāstra on War and Diplomacy in Ancient India" (PDF), The Journal of Military History, 67 (1): 9, doi:10.1353/jmh.2003.0006, ISSN 0899-3718, S2CID 154243517
- Bose, Sugata; Jalal, Ayesha. Modern South Asia: History, Culture, Political Economy. London and New York: Routledge.
- Bronkhorst, Johannes (2007). Greater Magadha: Studies in the culture of early India. BRILL. ISBN 978-90-04-15719-4. OCLC 897004884.
- Chakrabarty, Dilip K. (2010), The Geopolitical Orbits of Ancient India: The Geographical Frames of the Ancient Indian Dynasties, New Delhi, Oxford and New York: Oxford University Press, ISBN 978-0-19-908832-4
- Clark, Walter Eugene (1919). "The Importance of Hellenism from the Point of View of Indic-Philology". Classical Philology. 14 (4): 297–313. doi:10.1086/360246. S2CID 161613588.
- Coningham, Robin; Young, Ruth (2015). The Archaeology of South Asia: From the Indus to Asoka, c.6500 BCE–200 CE. Cambridge University Press. ISBN 978-1-316-41898-7.
- Danielou, Alain (2003). A Brief History of India. Inner Traditions. ISBN 978-0-89281-923-2.
- Dikshitar, V. R. Ramachandra (1993), The Mauryan Polity, Motilal Banarsidass Publ., ISBN 978-81-208-1023-5
- Dundas, Paul (2003), The Jains, Routledge, ISBN 978-0-415-26605-5
- Dupree, Louis (2014), Afghanistan, Princeton University Press, ISBN 978-1-4008-5891-0
- Eraly, Abraham (2002), Gem In The Lotus, Penguin, ISBN 978-93-5118-014-2
- Fisher, Michael (2018), An Environmental History of India, From the Earliest Times to the Twenty-First-Century, New Approaches in Asian History Series, Cambridge and New York: Cambridge University Press, ISBN 9781107111622
- Fleet, J.F. (1892), Bhadrabahu, Chandragupta and Shravanabelagola (Indian Antiquary), vol. 21, Archaeological Society of India
- Ghosh, Ajit Kumar (2001), Dwijendralal Ray, Makers of Indian Literature (1st ed.), New Delhi: Sahitye Akademi, ISBN 978-81-260-1227-5
- Grainger, John D. (2014), Seleukos Nikator: Constructing a Hellenistic Kingdom, Routledge, ISBN 978-1-317-80099-6
- Grant, R.G. (2010), Commanders, Penguin
- Guha-Thakurta, Tapati (2006), Chatterjee, Partha; Ghosh, Anjan (eds.), History and the Present, Anthem Press, ISBN 978-1-84331-224-6
- Habib, Irfan; Jha, Vivekanand (2004), Mauryan India, A People's History of India, Aligarh Historians Society / Tulika Books, ISBN 978-81-85229-92-8
- Haig, Malcolm Robert (1894). The Indus Delta Country: A Memoir, Chiefly on Its Ancient Geography and History. K. Paul, Trench, Trübner & Company, Limited.
- Harrison, Thomas (2009), The Great Empires of the Ancient World, Getty Publications, ISBN 978-0-89236-987-4
- Hemacandra (1998), The Lives of the Jain Elders, translated by R.C.C. Fynes, Oxford University Press, ISBN 978-0-19-283227-6
- Jain, Jyoti Prasad (2005), Jaina Sources of the History of Ancient India: 100 BC - AD 900, Munshiram Manoharlal, ISBN 9788121511407
- Jaini, Padmanabh S. (1991), Gender and Salvation, University of California Press, ISBN 978-0-520-06820-9
- Jansari, Sushma (2023), Chandragupta Maurya: The creation of a national hero in India, UCL Press, ISBN 9781800083882
- Jones, Constance; Ryan, James D. (2006), Encyclopedia of Hinduism, Infobase Publishing, ISBN 978-0-8160-7564-5
- Long, Jeffery D (2013), Jainism: An Introduction, I.B.Tauris, ISBN 978-0-85771-392-6
- Kosmin, Paul J. (2014), The Land of the Elephant Kings: Space, Territory, and Ideology in Seleucid Empire, Harvard University Press, ISBN 978-0-674-72882-0
- Kulke, Hermann; Rothermund, Dietmar (2004), A History of India (4th ed.), London: Routledge, ISBN 978-0-415-15481-9
- Lal bhargava, Purushottam (1996). Chandragupta Maurya A Gem of Indian History. D.K Printworld. ISBN 9788124600566.
- Ludden, David (2013), India and South Asia: A Short History, Oneworld Publications, ISBN 978-1-78074-108-6
- Majumdar, R. C. (2003) [1952], Ancient India, Motilal Banarsidass, ISBN 978-81-208-0436-4
- Majumdar, R. C.; Raychauduhuri, H. C.; Datta, Kalikinkar (1960), An Advanced History of India, London: Macmillan & Company Ltd; New York: St Martin's Press
- Malalasekera, Gunapala Piyasena (2002), Encyclopaedia of Buddhism: Acala, Government of Ceylon
- Mookerji, Radha Kumud (1962), Aśoka (3rd Revised., repr ed.), Delhi: Motilal Banarsidass (reprint 1995), ISBN 978-81208-058-28
- Mookerji, Radha Kumud (1988) [first published in 1966], Chandragupta Maurya and his times (4th ed.), Motilal Banarsidass, ISBN 81-208-0433-3
- Obeyesekere, Gananath (1980), Doniger, Wendy (ed.), Karma and Rebirth in Classical Indian Traditions, University of California Press, ISBN 978-0-520-03923-0
- Olivelle, Patrick (2013), King, Governance, and Law in Ancient India: Kauṭilya's Arthaśāstra, Oxford UK: Oxford University Press, ISBN 978-0199891825
- Raychaudhuri, H. C. (1923), Political History of Ancient India: From the Accession of Parikshit to the Extinction of the Gupta Dynasty, Oxford University Press (1996 reprint, with B. N. Mukerjee Introduction)
- Raychaudhuri, Hem Chandra; Mukherjee, B.N. (1997) [1923]. Political history of ancient India, from the accession of Parikshit to the extinction of the Gupta dynasty (eight ed.). Oxford University Press India.
- Raychaudhuri, H. C. (1967), "India in the Age of the Nandas / Chandragupta and Bindusara", in K. A. Nilakanta Sastri (ed.), Age of the Nandas and Mauryas (Second ed.), Motilal Banarsidass (1988 reprint), ISBN 978-81-208-0466-1
- Roy, Kaushik (2012), Hinduism and the Ethics of Warfare in South Asia: From Antiquity to the Present, Cambridge University Press, ISBN 978-1-107-01736-8
- Salomon, Richard (1998), Indian Epigraphy: A Guide to the Study of Inscriptions in Sanskrit, Prakrit, and the other Indo-Aryan Languages, Oxford University Press, ISBN 978-0-19-535666-3
- Samuel, Geoffrey (2010), The Origins of Yoga and Tantra. Indic Religions to the Thirteenth Century, Cambridge University Press
- Sastri, Kallidaikurichi Aiyah Nilakanta (1988), Age of the Nandas and Mauryas, Motilal Banarsidass, ISBN 978-81-208-0466-1
- Sen, R.K. (1895), "Origin of the Maurya of Magadha and of Chanakya", Journal of the Buddhist Text Society of India, The Society
- Sharma, Madhulika (2001). Fire Worship in Ancient India. Publication scheme. ISBN 9788186782576.
- Sherwin-White, Susan; Kuhrt, Amelie (1993). From Samarkhand to Sardis: A New Approach to the Seleucid Empire. University of California Press.
- Singh, Upinder (2016), A History of Ancient and Early Medieval India: From the Stone Age to the 12th Century, Pearson Education, ISBN 978-93-325-6996-6
- Singh, Upinder (2017), Political Violence in Ancient India, Harvard University Press, ISBN 978-0-674-97527-9
- Smith, V.A. (1914). The Early History Of India Third Edition (third ed.). Oxford University Press.
- Stein, Burton; Arnold, David (2010), A History of India (2 ed.), Wiley-Blackwell, p. 16, ISBN 978-1-4051-9509-6
- Stoneman, Richard (2019), The Greek Experience of India: From Alexander to the Indo-Greeks, Princeton University Press, ISBN 978-0-691-18538-5
- Tarn, W. W. (1922). The Greeks in Bactria and India. Cambridge University Press.
- Thapar, Romila (1961), Aśoka and the Decline of the Mauryas, Oxford University Press
- Thapar, Romila (2004) [first published by Penguin in 2002], Early India: From the Origins to A.D. 1300, University of California Press, ISBN 978-0-520-24225-8
- Thapar, Romila (2013), The Past Before Us, Harvard University Press, ISBN 978-0-674-72651-2
- Trautmann, Thomas R. (1970), "Alexander and Nandrus in Justin 15.4.16.", Annals of the Bhandarkar Oriental Research Institute, 51 (1/4)
- Upādhye, Ādinātha Neminātha (1977), Mahāvīra and His Teachings, Bhagavān Mahāvīra 2500th Nirvāṇa Mahotsava Samiti
- Vallely, Anne (2018), Kitts, Margo (ed.), Martyrdom, Self-Sacrifice, and Self-Immolation: Religious Perspectives on Suicide, Oxford University Press, ISBN 978-0-19-065648-5
- Varadpande, Manohar Laxman (2006), Woman in Indian Sculpture, Abhinav, ISBN 978-81-7017-474-5
- Wiley, Kristi L. (16 July 2009), The A to Z of Jainism, Scarecrow, ISBN 978-0-8108-6821-2
- Zvelebil, Kamil (1973), The Smile of Murugan: On Tamil Literature of South India, BRILL, ISBN 90-04-03591-5
- Yardley, John; Wheatley, Pat; Heckel, Waldemar (2011), Justin: Epitome of the Philippic History of Pompeius Trogus, Volume II: Books 13-15, The Successors to Alexander the Great (Translation, Appendices and Commentary), Oxford University Press, Clarendon Ancient History Series

Chandragupta Maurya Maurya dynasty
Preceded by Dhana Nanda (as king of the Magadha Empire)	Emperor of the Maurya Empire; 322–297 BCE	Succeeded by Bindusara
