= Harisena (disambiguation) =

Harisena may refer to:

- Harisena, a fourth century Sanskrit poet, panegyrist, and government minister
- Harisena (Jain monk), a tenth century Digambara Jain monk
- Harishena, (r. c. 475 – c. 500– ), ruler of the Vakataka dynasty in India
- Hari Sen (1955 –2024), an Indian historian and the titular raja of the erstwhile princely state of Suket in Himachal Pradesh
- Harisena or Harishena, the tenth Cakravartin in Jain universal history

== See also ==
- Hari (disambiguation)
- Sena (disambiguation)
- Harisen, a Japanese paper fan
