= Pipphalivana =

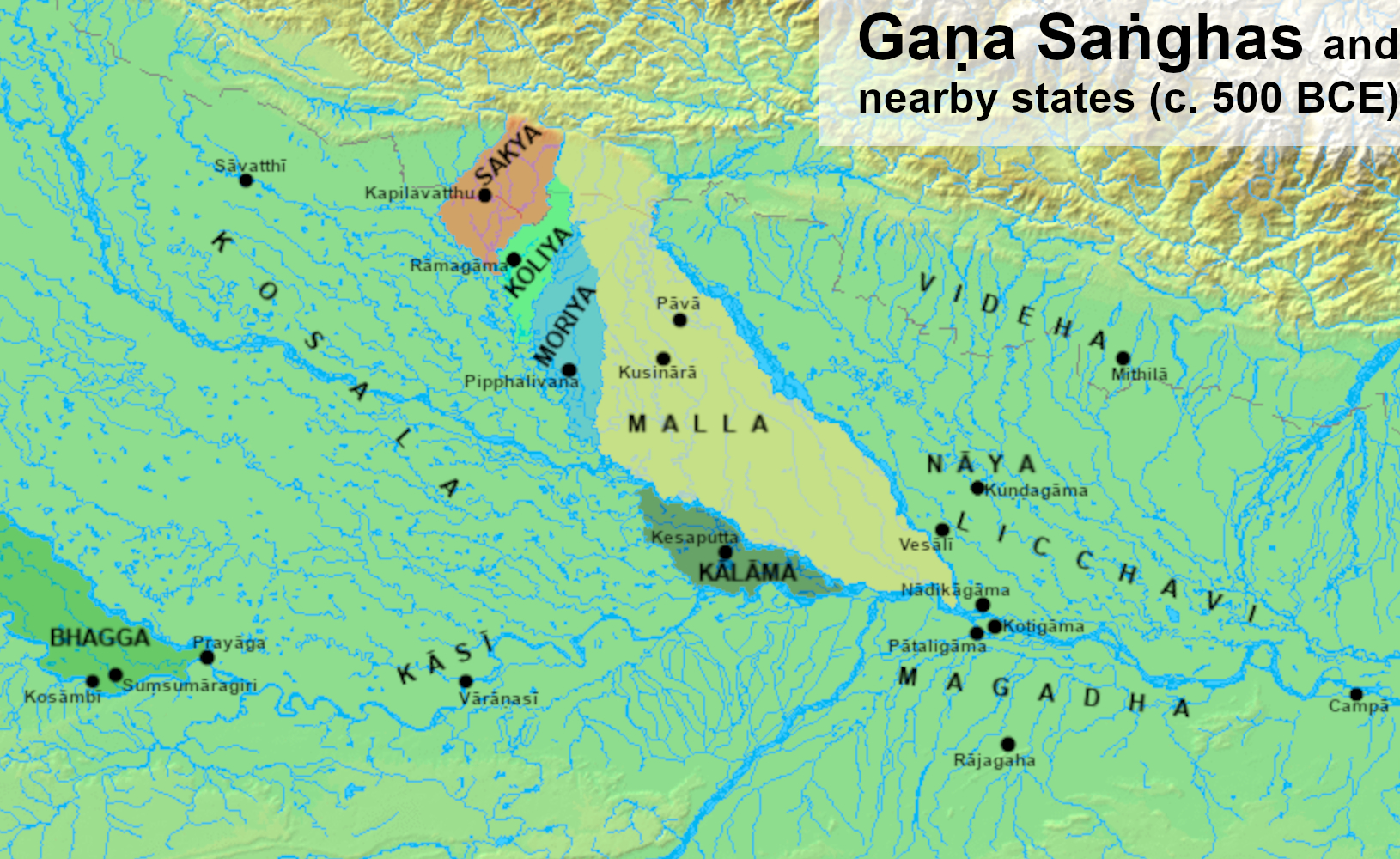
Gana Sanghas (c. 500 BCE)

Pipphalivana was the capital of the Moriya republic, a gana- sangha of the Mahajanapada period. The 7th century CE Chinese pilgrim Xuanzang later referred to it by the name of Nyagrodhavana.

Buddhist texts like the Dīgha Nikāya and Buddhavaṃsa suggest that Pipphalivana was the chief town and capital of the Moriyas.

== Location ==
Some say that Pipphalivana probably lay between Rummindei (Lumbini) in the Terai region of Nepal and Kasia in the modern-day Gorakhpur district. The town is identified with Nyagrodhavana (banyan grove), a village in Gorakhpur district which contained the famous Embers' stupa and was mentioned by Hiuen Tsang. Fa-Hien tells us that the stupa lay four yojanas to the east of the river Anoma and twelve yojanas to the west of Kusinara.

== Etymology ==
A tradition explains that the Moriyas took refuge in a pipphalivana (grove of pepper trees) and founded the city Moriyanagara there. The queen of Moriyanagara gave birth to Chandragupta, who was then raised by a herdsman and a hunter.

== Bibliography ==
- Sharma, J. P. (1968). Republics in Ancient India, C. 1500 B.C.-500 B.C. Leiden, Netherlands: E. J. Brill. ISBN 978-9-004-02015-3.
