= Sushma Jansari =

British-Indian historian

- Occupation: Curator of South Asia

Academic background
- Education: University College London

Academic work
- Institutions: The British Museum
- Website: https://sushmajansari.com/

Dr Sushma Jansari is Keeper of Global Arts, Cultures and Design at National Museum of Scotland and a Council member of the National Army Museum. She is the former Tabor Foundation curator of South Asia at the British Museum and was previously Vice Chair of Trustees of the Roald Dahl Museum and Story Centre (2020-2026. Jansari is the founder and presenter of The Wonder House podcast and a former council member and honorary joint-secretary of the Royal Numismatic Society.

== Education ==
Jansari studied ancient history at University College London, graduating with a BA in 2005 and MA in 2006. She undertook postgraduate research at this institution, completing her Doctor of Philosophy (PhD) degree in 2016 with a thesis titled "From Megasthenes to Sophytes: A re-examination of literary and numismatic sources for Seleucid-Mauryan relations in British and Indian scholarship".

== Career ==
While working on her PhD, Jansari joined the British Museum's Department of Asia and curated the ancient to mediaeval displays in the Sir Joseph Hotung Gallery for China and South Asia (opened 2017). In 2018, she was appointed Tabor Foundation curator of South Asia, becoming the first person of Indian origin to hold a permanent role curating the South Asian collections.

Jansari was lead curator (2016-2022) for the Manchester Museum South Asia Gallery, an award-winning British Museum Partnership Gallery which opened in 2023. She was the first Indian origin woman to join the Royal Numismatic Society Council (2012-2018) and hold the post of honorary joint-secretary. She introduced annual student and early career scholar lectures to the society.

As a curator of Gujarati origin, Jansari was featured in the Roots and Changes - Gujarati Influences exhibition at Brent Museum and Archives in 2021. Her book, Chandragupta Maurya: The Creation of a National Hero in India, was published by UCL Press in June 2023. The award-winning exhibition Ancient India: living traditions by Jansari, about art and religion in ancient South Asia, at The British Museum opened in May 2025. The exhibition book also titled Ancient India: living traditions was also released in May 2025 and is the first British Museum publication to be entirely vegan. The exhibition has received positive reviews.

== Podcaster ==
In 2019, Jansari launched The Wonder House podcast. She founded, presented and produced this show until 2022.

== Select publications ==
- Jansari, S. (2012). "Roman Coins from the Mackenzie Collection at the British Museum". Numismatic Chronicle. 172: 93–104.
- Jansari, S. (2012). "Roman Coins from the Masson and Mackenzie Collections in the British Museum". South Asian Studies. 29 (2): 177–193.
- Jansari, S; Ricot R. (2016). "Megasthenes and the Astomoi: a case study into ethnography and paradoxography". In Brinkhaus H.; Wieshöfer, J. (eds.). Megasthenes und seine Zeit/Megasthenes and his Time. Wiesebaden: Harrassowitz. pp. 85–96.
- Jansari, S. (2019). "The Sophytes coins: from the Punjab to Bactria and back again". Numismatic Chronicle. 178: 1–99.
- Jansari, S. (2019). "From Geography to Paradoxography: the use, transmission and survival of Megasthenes Indica". Journal of Ancient History. 8 (1): 26–49.
- Jansari, S. (2019). "Colonial Collecting in Ceylon: Dispersing the Hugh Nevill Collections across the British Isles". In Peyton, A.B.; Paul, K.A. (eds.). Arts of South Asia: Cultures of Collecting. University of Florida Press. pp. 63–94. ISBN 9781683400479.
- Jansari, S. (2020). "South Asia". In Mairs, R. (ed.). The Graeco-Bactrian and Indo-Greek World. Routledge. pp. 38–55. ISBN 9781138090699.
- Jansari, S. (2020). "Two sides of the coin: from Sophytes to Skanda-Kārttikeya". In Mairs, R. (ed.). The Graeco-Bactrian and Indo-Greek World. Routledge. pp. 487–498. ISBN 9781138090699.
- Argounova-Low, T.; Brown, A.; Jansari, S. (2020). Model of a Summer Camp. London: British Museum Press. ISBN 0714124885.
- Jansari, S. (2020). "Buildings with a Message – Experimenting with a Rich Mosaic of Objects and Voices". RETHINK Design Guide: Architecture for a post-pandemic world. London: RIBA Publishing. pp. 66–69. ISBN 9781859469804.
- Jansari, S. (2023). Chandragupta Maurya: The creation of a national hero in India. London: UCL Press. ISBN 9781800083905.
- Jansari, S. and Muthukumaran, S. (2025). Ancient India: living traditions. London: British Museum Press. ISBN 978-0714124995.
