= J. W. McCrindle =

Scottish classical philologist

John Watson McCrindle (16 May 1825 - 16 July 1913, West Cliff-on-Sea) was a Scottish classical philologist and educator who wrote several major works on references to India in ancient classical writings.

== Life ==
McCrindle was the son of John McCrindle and was born near Maybole, Ayrshire and went to the University of Edinburgh where he received the Stratton Gold Medal in 1853. He graduated BA in 1854 and MA in 1855 and taught for a while in Edinburgh schools before moving to India in 1859 to become Principal of the Doveton College in Calcutta. He became a professor at Patna College and later at Krishnagar College. He became the first principal of Patna College from 1867 and retired in 1880. He founded a school for girls in Patna. He wrote a number of works (first in the Indian Antiquary and later as books) on ancient India as described in the works of Ctesias, Megasthenes and Arrian; the Periplus Maris Erythraei ("Coastal Cruise of the Red Sea"); Ptolemy's geography of India and the invasion of India by Alexander the Great.
