= Harisena (Jain monk) =

Personal life
- Born: 10th century CE
- Died: 10th century CE
- Notable work: Brhatkathakosha

Religious life
- Religion: Jainism
- Sect: Digambara

Harisena was a tenth century Digambara monk who wrote Brhatkathakosha (great storehouse of stories) in 932 AD. The text talks about the stupas in Mathura being erected by devas during controversies with Buddhists. He was cited by Debala Mitra to indicate existence of five stupas in Mathura.
