= Patna =

Metropolis and state capital of Bihar, India

Patna Paṭanā (Hindi) Pāṭaliputra
- Metropolis, State capital city
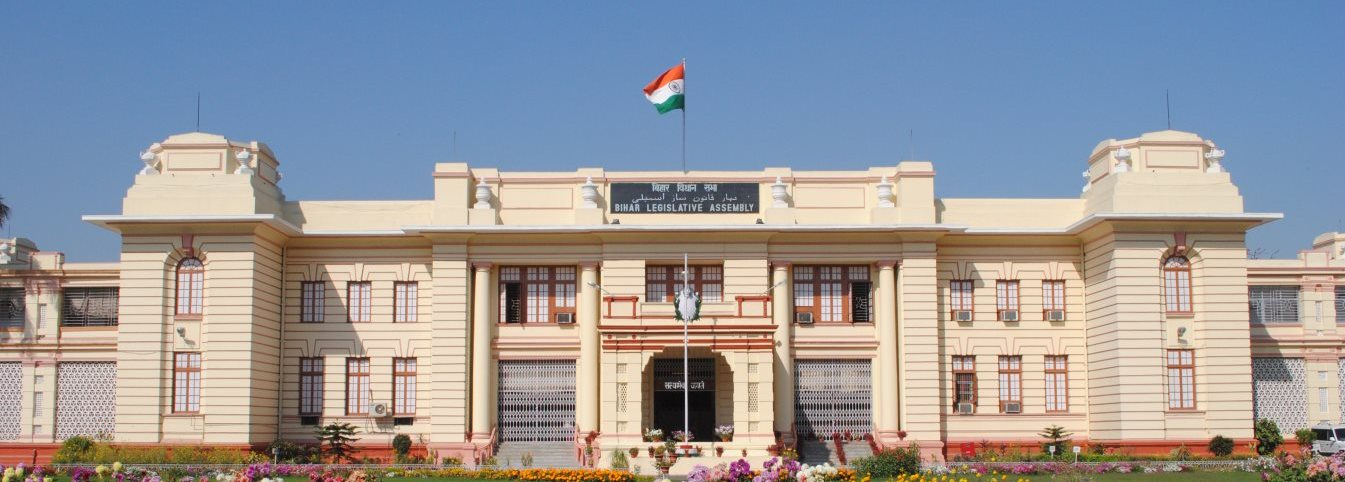
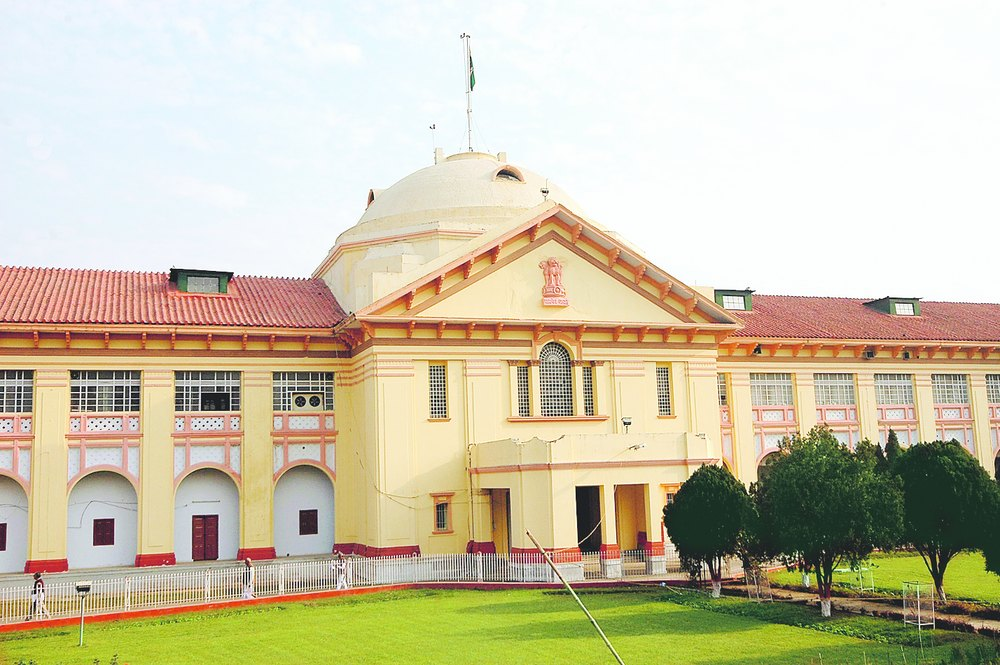
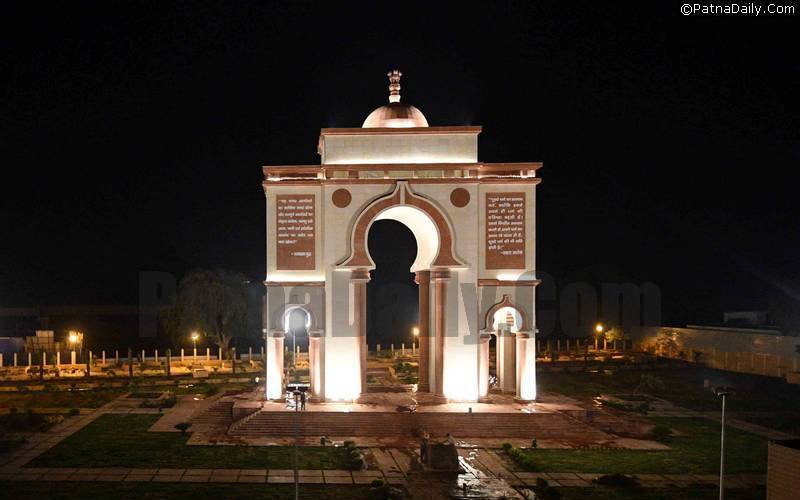
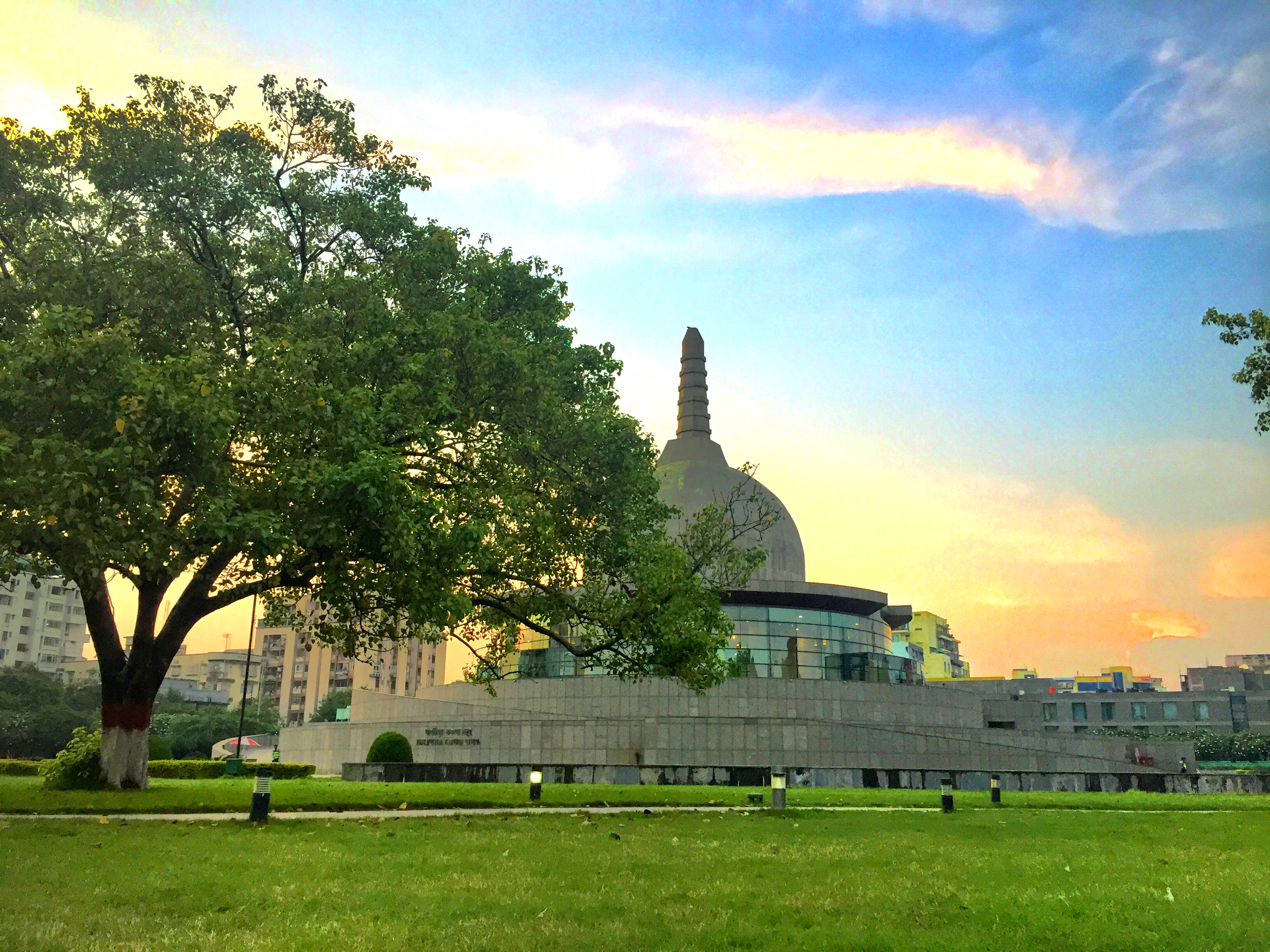
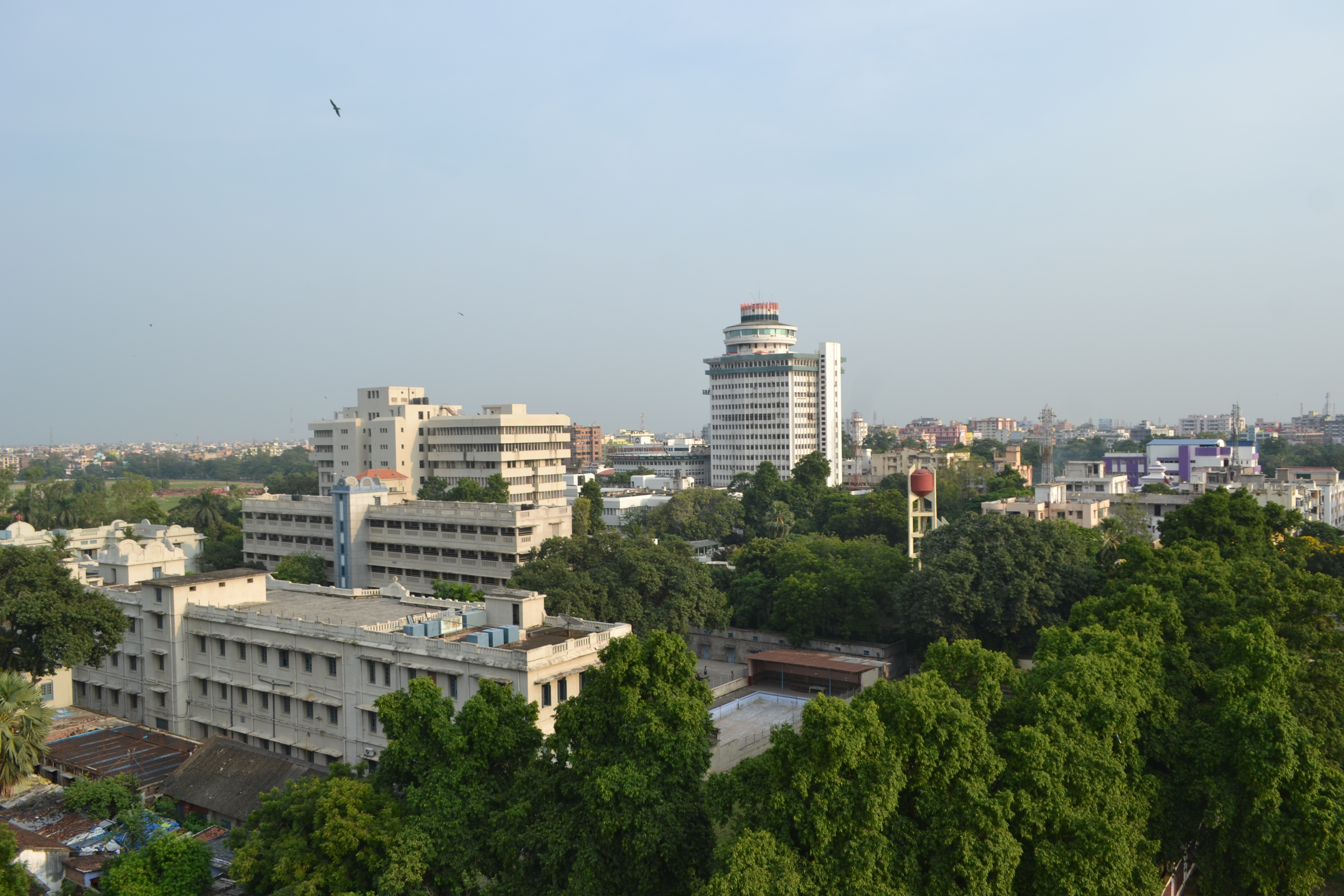
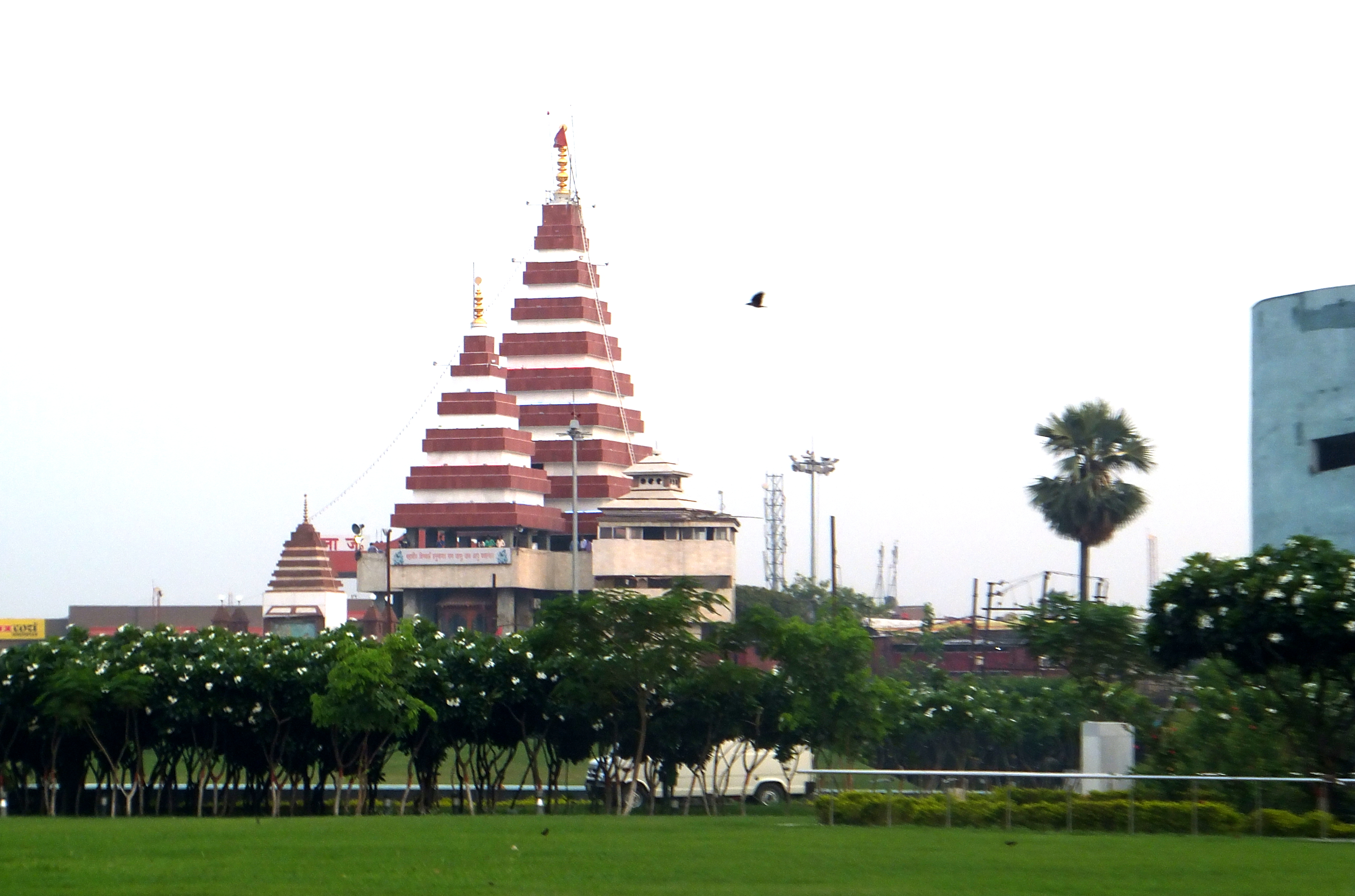
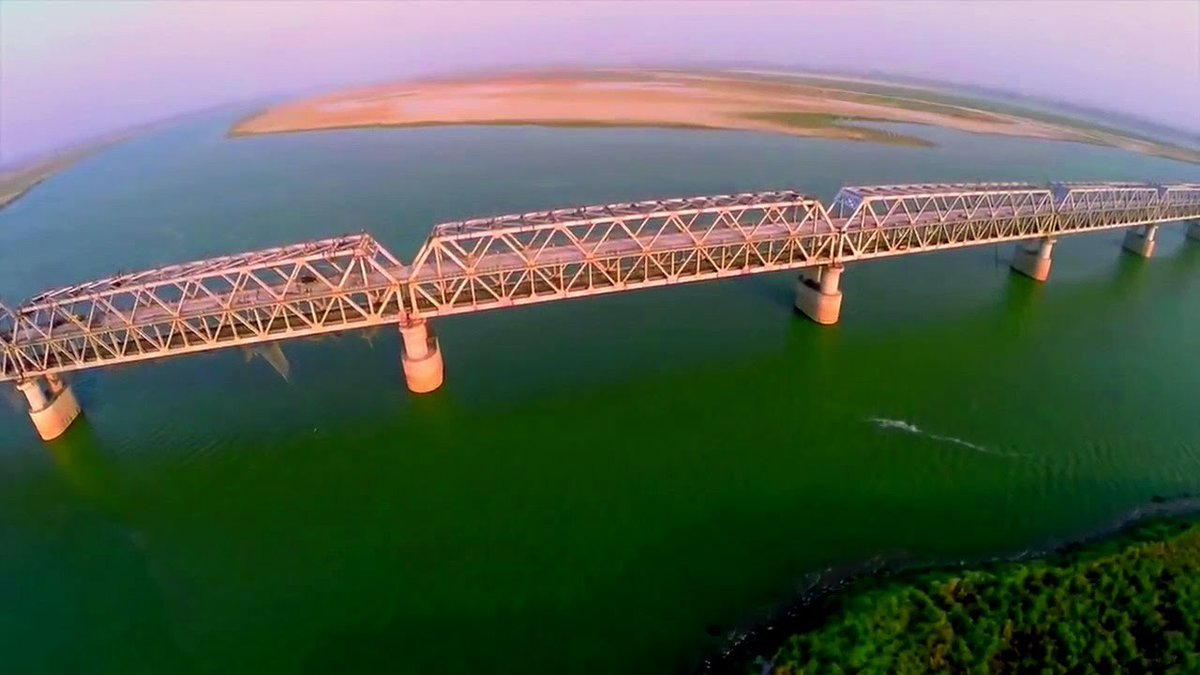
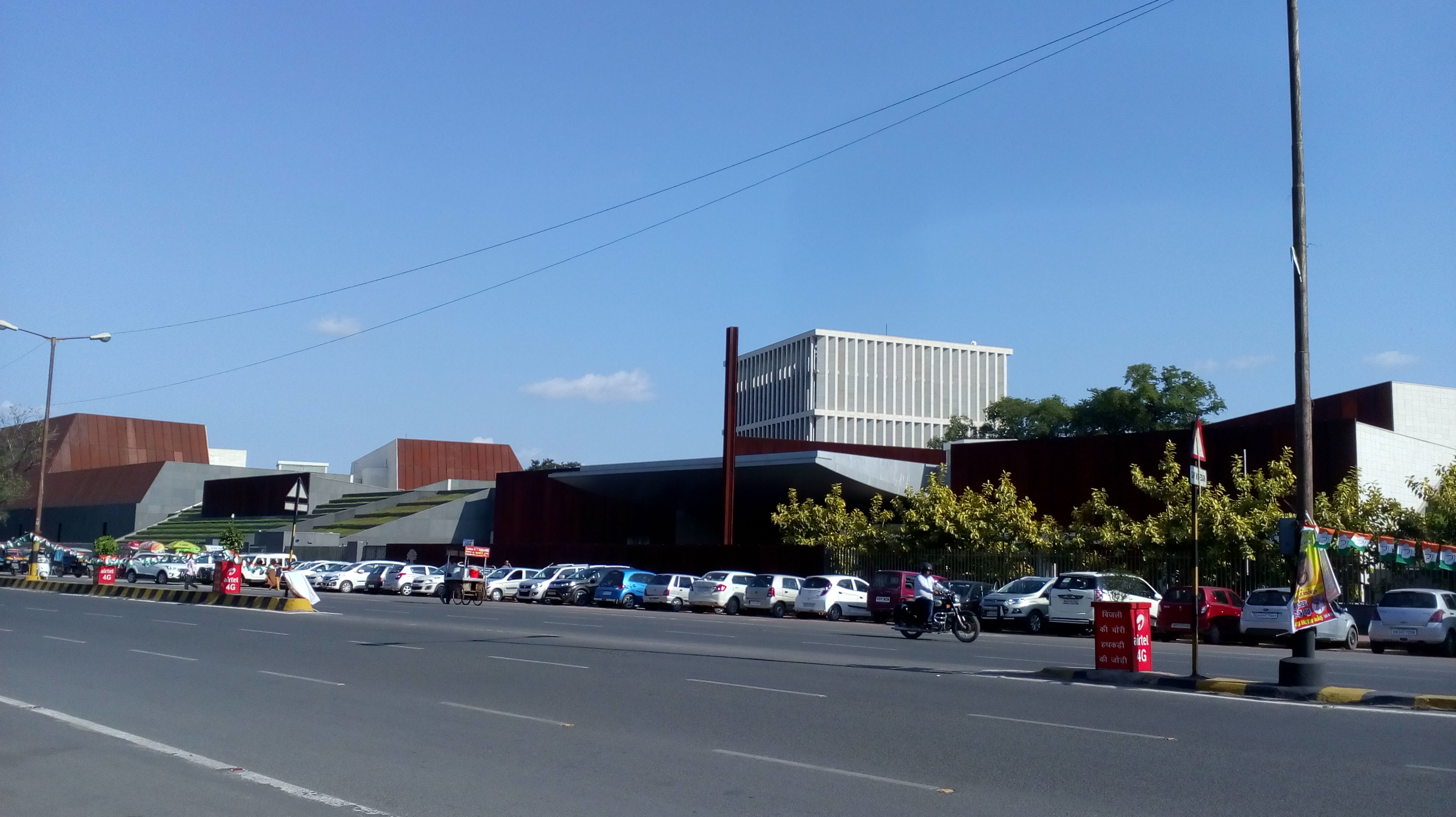
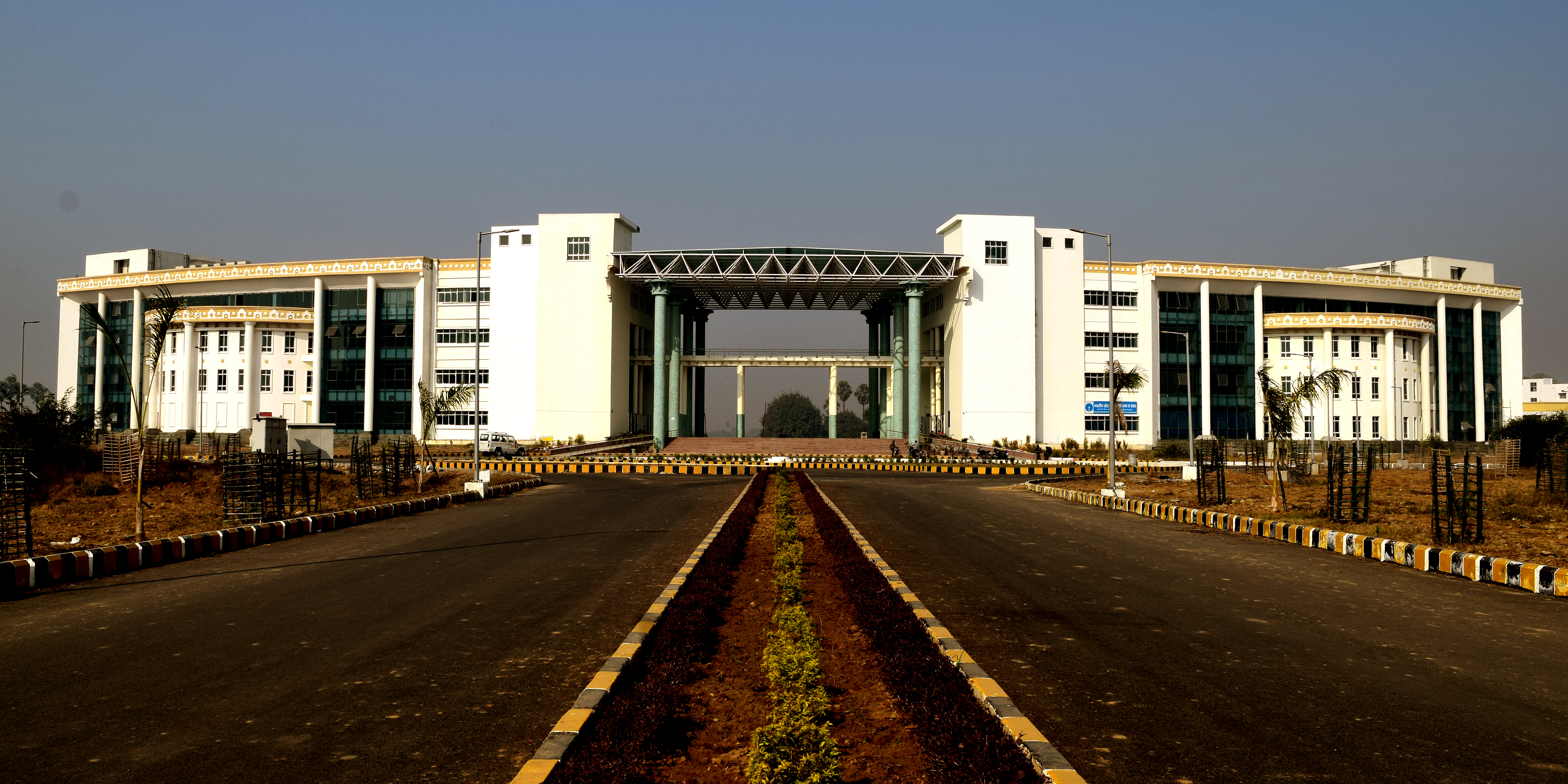
- Bihar Legislature Patna High Court Sabhyata Dwar Buddha Smriti Park City view Mahavir Mandir Digha–Sonpur Bridge Bihar Museum in Bailey Road IIT Patna
- Interactive map of Patna
- Coordinates: 25°35′38″N 85°08′15″E
- Country: India
- State: Bihar
- Division: Patna
- District: Patna
- Established: 490 BCE
- Founder: Udayin

Government
  - Type: Municipal corporation
  - Body: Patna Municipal Corporation
  - Parliament of India: Ravi Shankar Prasad (BJP); Misa Bharti (RJD)
  - Mayor: Sita Sahu (BJP)

Area
  - City: 250 km^{2} (97 sq mi)
  - Metro: 600 km^{2} (230 sq mi)
  - Rank: 18
- Elevation: 53 m (174 ft)

Population (2011)
  - City: 1,684,222 (IN: 19th)
  - Density: 6,800/km^{2} (18,000/sq mi)
  - Urban: 2,046,652 (IN: 18th)
  - Metro: 3,874,000 (IN: 12th)
- Demonym(s): Pataniya (local), Patnawasi (Hindi), Patnaite

Language
  - Official: Hindi
  - Additional: Urdu
  - Regional: Magahi; Bhojpuri; Maithili
- Time zone: UTC+5:30 (IST)
- Pincode(s): 8000xx (Patna)
- Area Code(s): +91-(0)612
- ISO 3166 code: IN-BR-PA; IN PAT
- Vehicle registration: BR-01
- Literacy (2011): 82.73%
- Sex ratio (2011): 897 ♀/1000 ♂
- Airport: Jay Prakash Narayan Airport
- Rapid Transit: Patna Metro
- HDI: ▲0.722 - high
- GDP per capita(2020): US$7,766 (equivalent to $9,661 in 2025)
- GDP(2024): US$17.085 (equivalent to $21.25 in 2025)Billion
- Website: patna.nic.in

Patna (Hindi: Paṭanā, pronounced [ˈpəʈnaː]), historically known as Pāṭaliputra, is the capital and largest city of the Indian state of Bihar. According to the United Nations, as of 2026, Patna had a population of 3.33 million, making it the 19th largest city in India. Covering 250 square kilometres (97 sq mi) and over 2.5 million people, its urban agglomeration is the 18th largest in India. Patna also serves as the seat of Patna High Court. The Buddhist, Hindu and Jain pilgrimage centres of Vaishali, Rajgir, Nalanda, Bodh Gaya and Pawapuri are nearby and Patna City is a sacred city for Sikhs as the tenth Sikh Guru, Guru Gobind Singh was born here. The modern city of Patna is mainly on the southern bank of the river Ganges. The city also straddles the rivers Son, Gandak and Punpun. The city is approximately 35 kilometres (22 mi) in length and 16 to 18 kilometres (9.9 to 11.2 mi) wide.

One of the oldest continuously inhabited places in the world, Patna was founded in 490 BCE by the king of Magadha. Ancient Patna, known as Pataliputra, was the capital of the Magadha Empire throughout the Haryanka, Nanda, Mauryan, Shunga, Gupta, and Pala dynasties. Pataliputra was a seat of learning and fine arts. It was home to many astronomers and scholars including Aryabhata, Vātsyāyana and Chanakya. During the Maurya period (around 300 BCE) its population was about 400,000. Patna served as the seat of power, and political and cultural centre of the Indian subcontinent during the Maurya and Gupta empires. With the fall of the Gupta Empire, Patna lost its glory. The British revived it again in the 17th century as a centre of international trade. Following the partition of Bengal presidency in 1912, Patna became the capital of Bihar and Orissa Province.

Until the 19th century, it was a major trading and commercial hub in India. After independence there were a few downturns but its economy was still stable. After the separation of Jharkhand from Bihar, it lost its glory. As per the Directorate of Economics and Statistics (Government of Bihar), Nominal GDP of Patna District was estimated at INR 63,176.55 crores in 2011-12. As of 2011-12, Patna already recorded per capita gross domestic product of ₹1,08,657, way ahead of many other Indian cities and state capitals. Using figures for assumed average annual growth, Patna is the 21st fastest growing city in the world and 5th fastest growing city in India according to a study by the City Mayors Foundation. Patna registered an average annual growth of 3.72% during 2006–2010. As of 2011-12, the GDP per capita of Patna is ₹1,08,657, and its GDP growth rate is 7.29 per cent. In June 2009, the World Bank ranked Patna second in India (after Delhi) for ease of starting a business.

== Etymology ==
The name of this city has changed with time. One of the oldest cities of India, there are several theories regarding the origin of the modern name Patna (Bengali: পাটনা; Devanagari: पटना; Kaithi: 𑂣𑂗𑂢𑂰; Gurmukhi: ਪਟਨਾ; Urdu: پٹنہ). It is etymologically derived from Patan (Devanagari: पटन), the name of the Hindu goddess, Patan Devi. Patan Devi Mandir is still in old Patna near Gulzarbagh mandi along with another, Patan Devi Mandir, near Takht Sri Patna Sahib. Many believe Patna derived its name from Patli, a tree variety that was found in abundance in the historic city. It is also seen on the state tourism's logo. The place is mentioned in Chinese traveller Fa Hien's records as Pa-lin-fou. The city has been known by various names through more than 2,000 years of existence – Pataligrama, Pataliputra, Kusumapura, Kusumdhwaja Pushpapuram, Padmavathi, Azimabad and the present-day Patna. Legend ascribes the origin of Patna to the mythological King Putraka who created Patna by magic for his queen Patali, literally "trumpet flower", which gives it its ancient name Pataligrama. It is said that in honour of the queen's firstborn, the city was named Pataliputra. Gram is Sanskrit for village and Putra means son. Legend also says that the Emerald Buddha was created in Patna (then Pataliputra) by Nagasena in 43 BCE.

== History ==
=== Ancient Era ===
Traditional Buddhist literature attributes foundation of Patna 490 BCE as Ajatashatru, the king of Magadha, wanted to shift his capital from the hilly Rajagrha (today Rajgir) to a strategically chosen place to better combat the Licchavis of Vaishali. He chose the site on the bank of the Ganges and fortified the area. Gautama Buddha travelled through this place in the last year of his life. He prophesied a great future for this place even as he predicted its ruin due to flood, fire, and feud. According to Dieter Schlingloff, the Buddhist accounts may have presented the grandeur of Patna as a prophecy and that its wooden fortifications, unlike other early historic Indian cities, indicate that it might be much older than thought but only archaeological excavation and C14 dates of its wooden palisades which is presently lacking may establish this.

=== Mauryan Empire ===
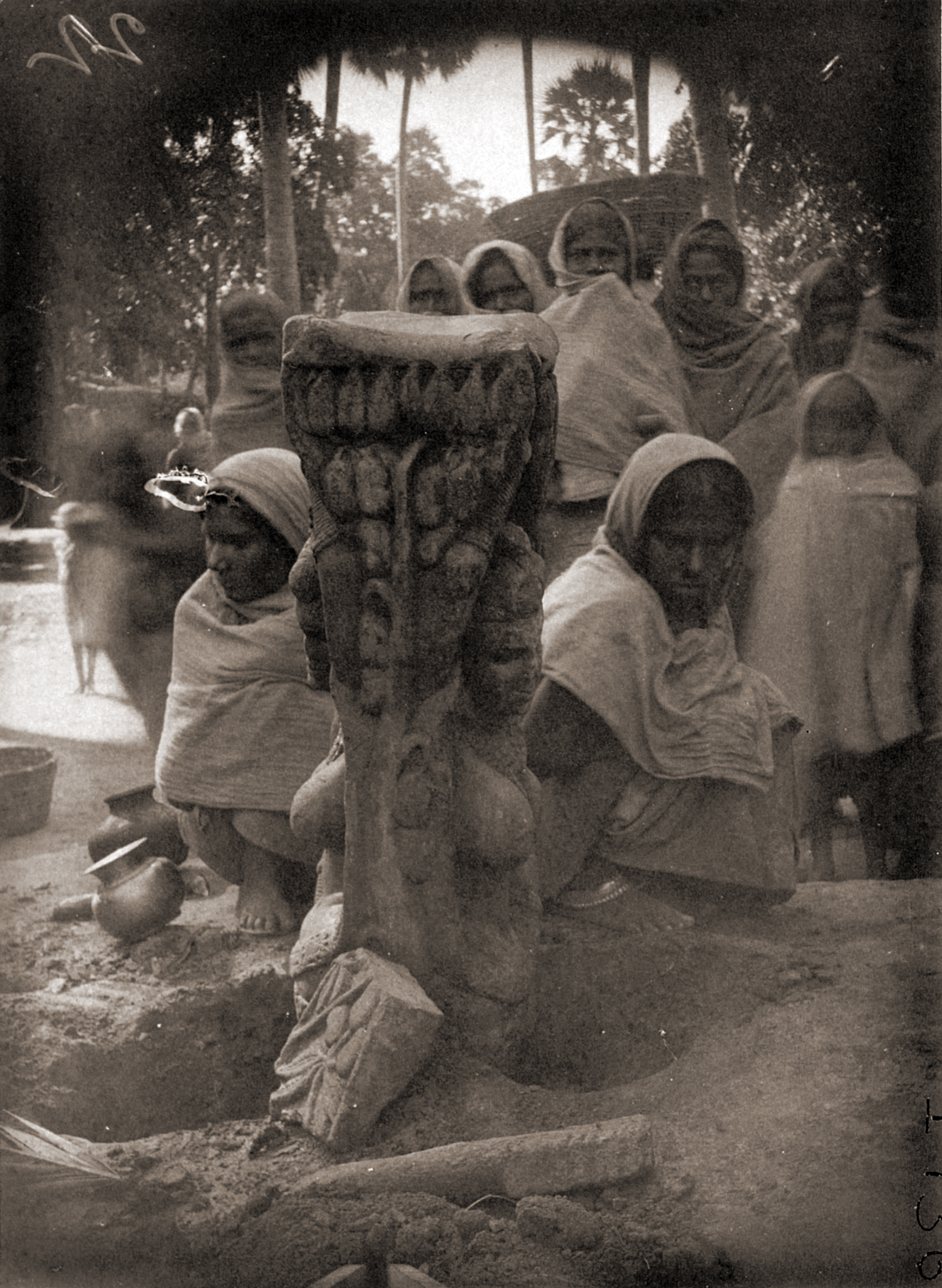
Statue of Matrikas found near Agam Kuan, built by Ashoka.

Megasthenes, the Indo-Greek historian and ambassador to the court of Chandragupta Maurya, gave one of the earliest accounts of the city. He wrote that the city was on the confluence of the rivers Ganga and Arennovoas (Sonabhadra – Hiranyawah) and was 14 kilometres (9 mi) long and 2.82 kilometres (1.75 mi) wide. Megasthenes, the Greek ambassador to India, described the city as the greatest city on earth during its heyday. The Shungas ultimately retained control of Pataliputra and ruled for almost 100 years. The Shungas were followed by the Kanvas and eventually by the Guptas. Some Chinese travellers came to India in pursuit of knowledge and recorded their observations about Pataliputra in their travelogues. One such famous account was recorded by a Chinese Buddhist traveller Fa Hien, who visited India between 399 and 414 CE, and stayed here for many months translating Buddhist texts. When the Chinese Buddhist Monk Faxian visited the city in 400 A.D, he found the people to be rich and prosperous; they practised virtue and justice. He found that the nobles and householders of the city had constructed several hospitals in which the poor of all countries, the needy, the crippled, and the diseased, could get treatment. They could receive every kind of help gratuitously. Physicians would inspect the diseases and order them food, drink, and medicines.

=== Gupta and Pala empire ===
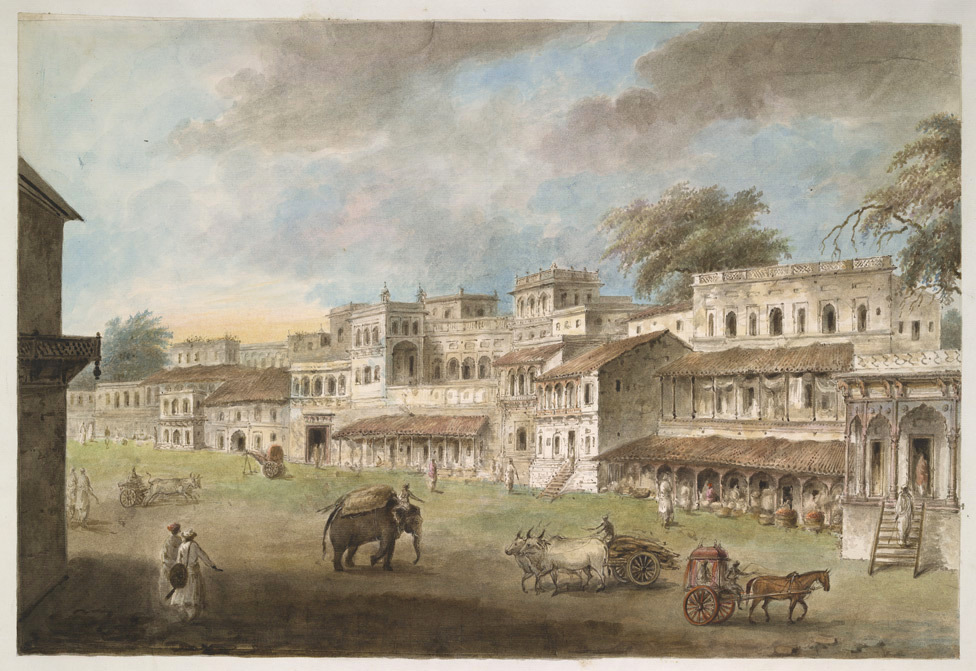
Main street of Patna, showing one side of the Chowk, 1814–15.

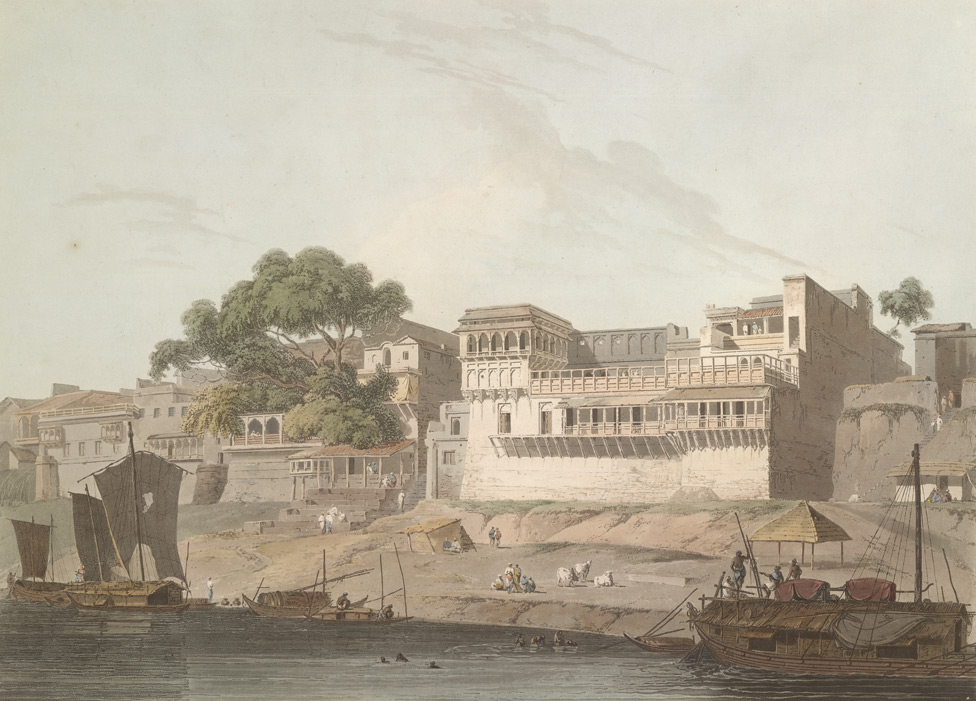
City of Patna, on the River Ganges, 19th-century painting.

In the years that followed, many dynasties ruled the Indian subcontinent from the city, including the Gupta Empire and the Pala kings. With the disintegration of the Gupta empire, Patna passed through uncertain times. Bakhtiar Khilji captured Bihar in the 12th century and destroyed everything, and Patna lost its prestige as the political and cultural centre of India.

=== Mughal Empire ===
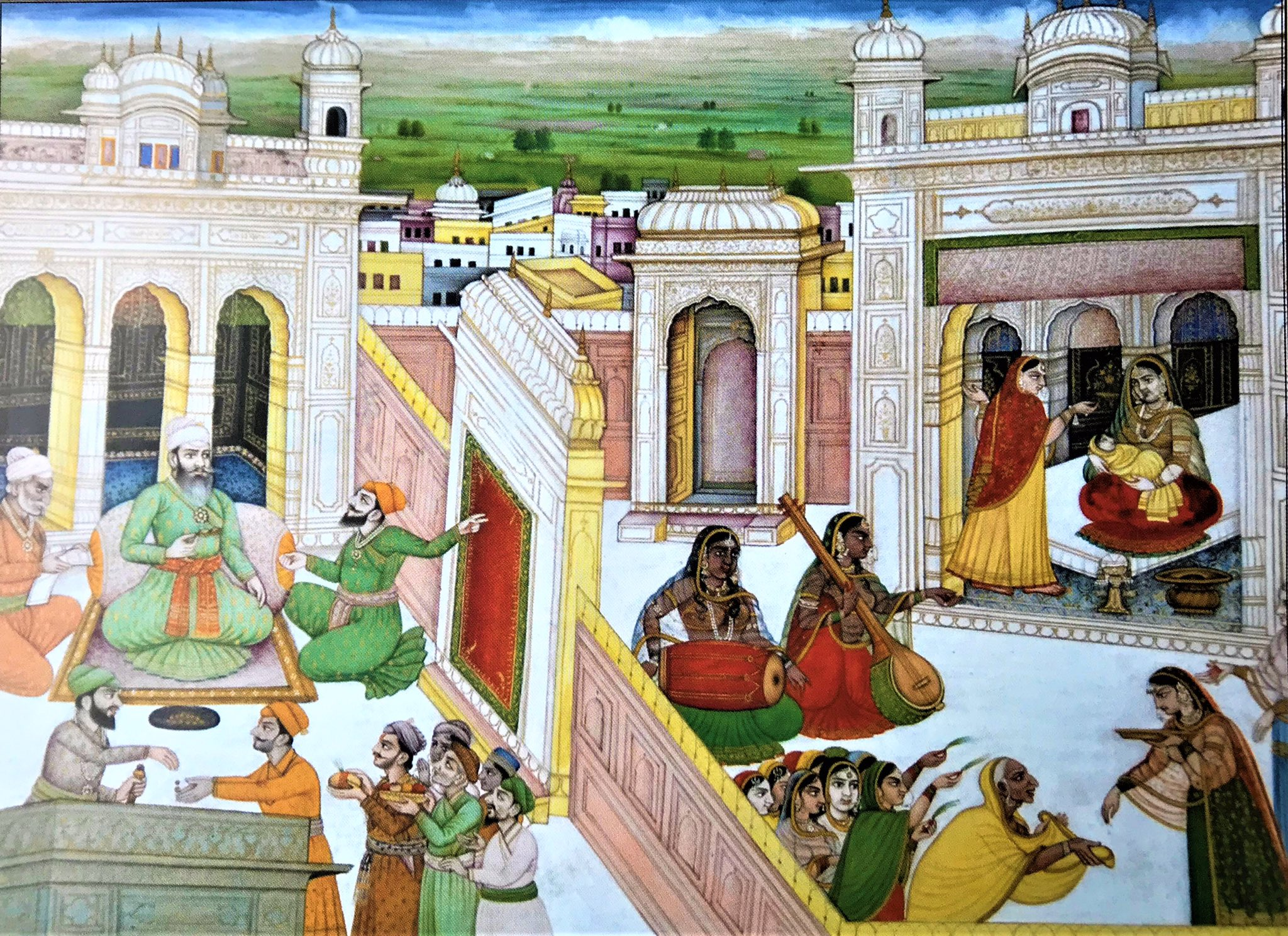
Guru Tegh Bahadur (in Dhaka) being told about the birth of Gobind Rai (in Patna), 19th century painting

The Mughal Empire was a period of unremarkable provincial administration from Delhi. The most remarkable period during the Middle Ages was under the Afghan emperor Sher Shah Suri, who revived Patna in the middle of the 16th century. He built a fort and founded a town on the banks of the Ganges. Sher Shah's fort in Patna does not survive, although the Sher Shah Suri mosque, built in Afghan architectural style, does. Mughal emperor Akbar reached Patna in 1574 to crush the rebellious Afghan Chief Daud Khan. One of the navratnas from Akbar's court, his official historian and author of "Ain-i-Akbari" Abul Fazl refers to Patna as a flourishing centre for paper, stone and glass industries. He also refers to the high quality of numerous strains of rice grown in Patna, famous as Patna rice in Europe. By 1620, the city of Patna was being described as the "chiefest mart towne of all Bengala" (i.e. largest town in Bengal) in northern India, "the largest town in Bengal and the most famous for trade". This was before the founding of the city of Calcutta. Mughal Emperor Aurangzeb acceded to the request of his favourite grandson, Prince Muhammad Azim, to rename Patna as Azimabad, in 1704 while Azim was in Patna as the subedar. Patna or Azimabad did see some violent activities, according to Phillip Mason, writing in the book "The Men Who Ruled India". "Aurangzeb had restored the poll tax (Jazia) on unbelievers, which had to be compounded for. In Patna, Peacock, the factory's chief, was not sufficiently obedient. He was seized, forced to walk through the town bare-headed and bare-footed, and subjected to many other indignities before he paid up and was released." Little changed during this period other than the name. With the decline of the Mughal empire, Patna moved into the hands of the Nawabs of Bengal, who levied a heavy tax on the populace but allowed it to flourish as a commercial centre. The mansions of the Maharaja of Tekari Raj dominated the Patna riverfront in 1811–12. In 1750, the future Nawab of Bengal, Siraj ud-Daulah revolted against his grandfather, Alivardi Khan, and seized Patna, but quickly surrendered and was forgiven. Guru Gobind Singh (22 December 1666 – 7 October 1708), the tenth Guru of the Sikhs, was born as Gobind Rai in Patna to Guru Teg Bahadur, the ninth Guru of the Sikhs, and his wife Mata Gujri. His birthplace, Patna Sahib, is one of the most sacred sites of pilgrimage for Sikhs.

=== Portuguese Empire ===
As trade grew, settlements of the Portuguese empire expanded to the Bengal Gulf. Since at least 1515, the Portuguese were in Bengal as traders, and later in 1521, an embassy was sent to Gaur to create factories in the region. The Bengal Sultan after 1534 allowed the Portuguese to develop several settlements as Chitagoong e Satgaon. In 1535 the Portuguese were allied with the Bengal sultan and held the Teliagarhi pass 280 km from Patna helping to avoid the invasion by the Mughals. By then, several of the products came from Patna, and the Portuguese sent in traders, establishing a factory there in 1580 at least. The products were shipped out down the river until other Portuguese ports as Chittagoon e Satgaoon, and from there to the rest of the empire.

=== British Empire ===
During the 17th century, Patna became a centre of international trade. In 1620, the English East India Company established a factory in Patna for trading in calico and silk. Soon it became a trading centre for saltpetre. Francois Bernier, in Travels in the Mogul Empire (1656–1668), says, ". It was carried down the Ganges with great facility, and the Dutch and English sent large cargoes to many parts of the Indies, and Europe". This trade encouraged other Europeans, principally the French, Danes, Dutch, and Portuguese, to compete in the lucrative business. Peter Mundy, writing in 1632, described Patna as "the greatest mart of the eastern region". In 1763, Nawab Mir Qasim ordered the killing of 45 mainly British employees and 200 sepoys of the East India Company in the Patna massacre; the prisoners were shot to death in their cells and their bodies dumped in a well. After the decisive Battle of Buxar of 1764, the treaty of Allahabad marked the start of the political and constitutional involvement of the British in India. It gave the East India Company the right to collect a tax of this former Mughal province by the Mughal emperor. Patna was annexed by the company in 1793 to its territory when Nizamat (Mughal suzerainty) was abolished, and the British East India Company took control of the province of Bengal-Bihar. Patna, however, continued as a trading centre. In 1912, when the Bengal Presidency was partitioned, Patna became the capital of the British province of Bihar and Orissa. However, in 1936 Orissa became a separate entity with its capital. To date, a major population of Bengalis continue to live in Patna.

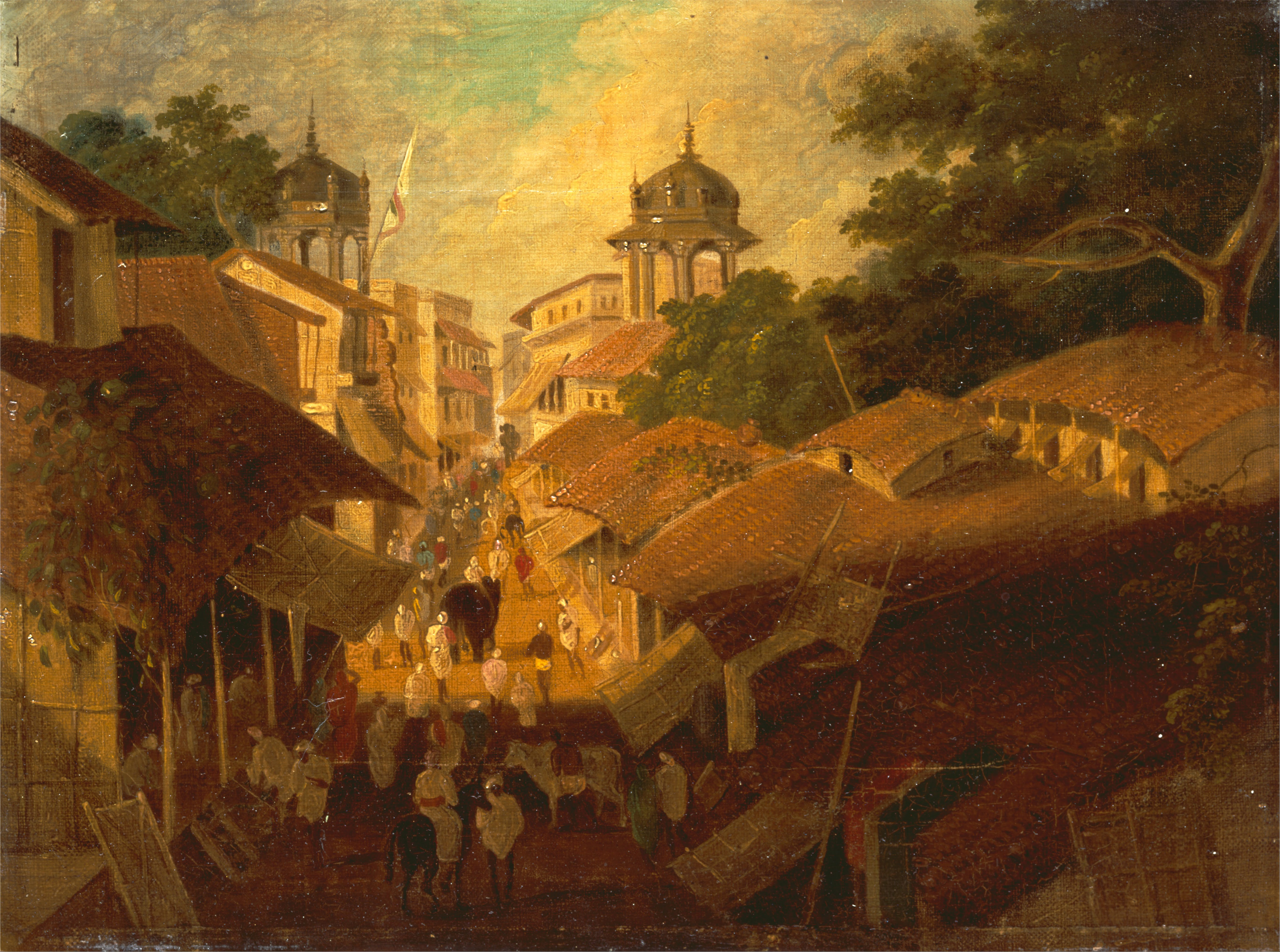
Street in Patna, 1825 (British, active in India)

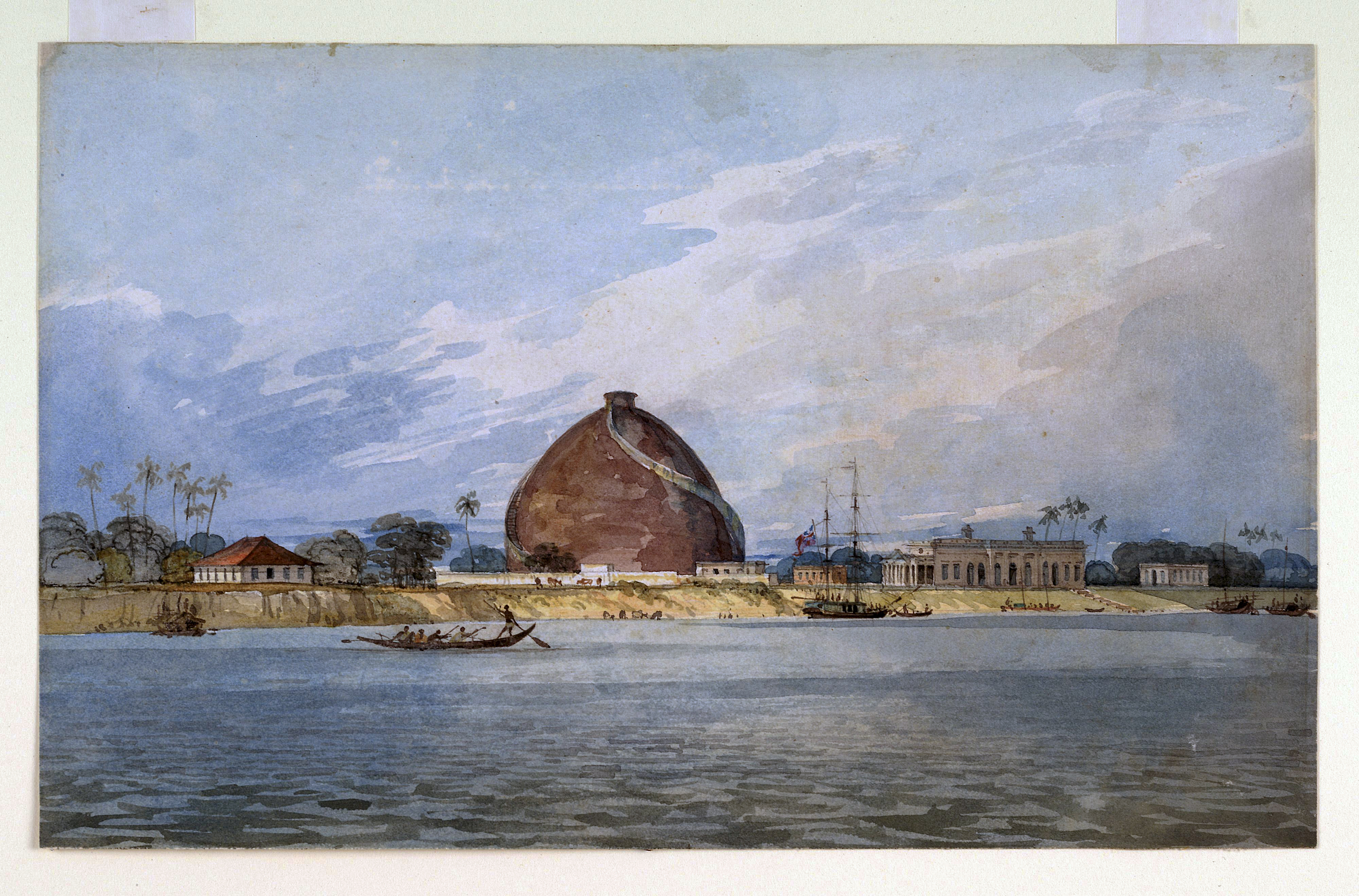
Golghar at Bankipore, near Patna, 1814–15

==== Indian Independence Movement ====
People from Patna were greatly involved in the Indian independence movement. Most notable movements were the Champaran movement against the Indigo plantation and the 1942 Quit India Movement. National leaders who came from the city include Swami Sahajanand Saraswati; the first President of the Constituent Assembly of India, Dr. Rajendra Prasad; Bihar Vibhuti (Anugrah Narayan Sinha); Basawon Singh (Sinha); and Loknayak (Jayaprakash Narayan).

=== Post-Independence ===
Patna remained the capital of Bihar after India gained independence in 1947, even as Bihar was partitioned again in 2000 when Jharkhand became a separate state of the Indian union. On 27 October 2013, six people were killed and 85 others were injured in a series of co-ordinated bombings at an election rally for BJP candidate Narendra Modi. On 3 October 2014, 33 people were killed and 26 injured in a stampede at Gandhi Maidan during Vijaya Dashmi celebrations.

== Geography ==
=== Topography ===
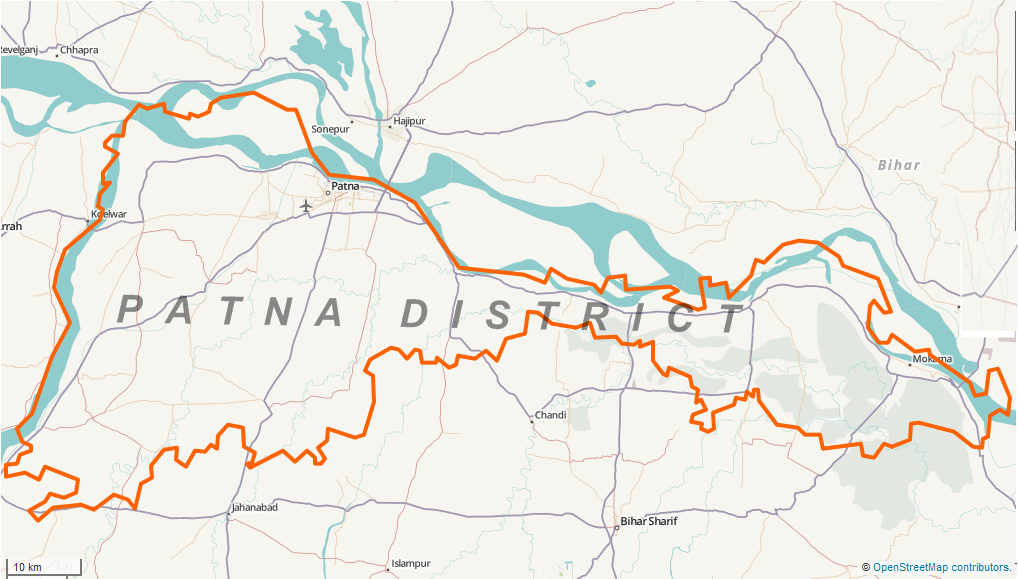
Map of Patna district

Patna's Urban agglomeration
Jurisdiction		Population
Town	Type	Estimate (2011)
Patna	Municipal Corporation	1,684,222
Danapur	Nagar Parishad	182,429
Badalpura	Out Growth	75
Danapur Cantonment	Cantonment Board	28,723
Khagaul	Nagar Parishad	44,364
Nohsa	Census Town	16,680
Pataliputra Housing Colony	Census Town	3,531
Phulwari Sharif	Nagar Parishad	81,740
Saidpura	Census Town	7,392
Patna UA		2,049,156
Patna district		5,838,465

Patna is on the southern bank of the river Ganges. The total area of Patna is 250 km^{2} (97 sq mi). The municipal area constitutes 109.218 km^{2} (42.169 sq mi). The suburban area covers 140.782 km^{2} (54.356 sq mi). It has an average elevation of 53 m (174 ft). A characteristic feature of the geography of Patna is its confluence of major rivers.

During the British Raj, Patna was part of the Bengal Presidency. After Nalanda district was carved out of Patna district in 1976, Patna was purged of all hilly regions. It is an alluvial, flat expanse of land. The land in the district is fertile and is almost entirely cultivated, with no forest cover. Alluvial soil is ideal for cultivating rice, sugarcane, and other food grains. The area under cultivation is studded with mango orchards and bamboo groves. In the fields along the banks of river Ganges, weeds such as ammannia, citriculari, hygrophile and sesbania grow. But palmyra, date palm, and mango orchards are found near habitations. Dry stretches of shrubbery are sometimes seen in the villages far from the rivers. Trees commonly found are bel, siris, jack fruit, and the red cotton tree. Patna is unique in having four large rivers in its vicinity. It is the largest riverine city in the world. The topography of Patna city is saucer shaped as per Patna City Development Plan prepared in 2006. The bridge over the river Ganges, named Mahatma Gandhi Setu, is 5575m long. It is the longest river bridge in India.

Patna comes under India's seismic zone-IV, indicating its vulnerability to major earthquakes, but earthquakes have not been common in recent history. Patna also falls in the risk zone for floods and cyclones.

=== Climate ===
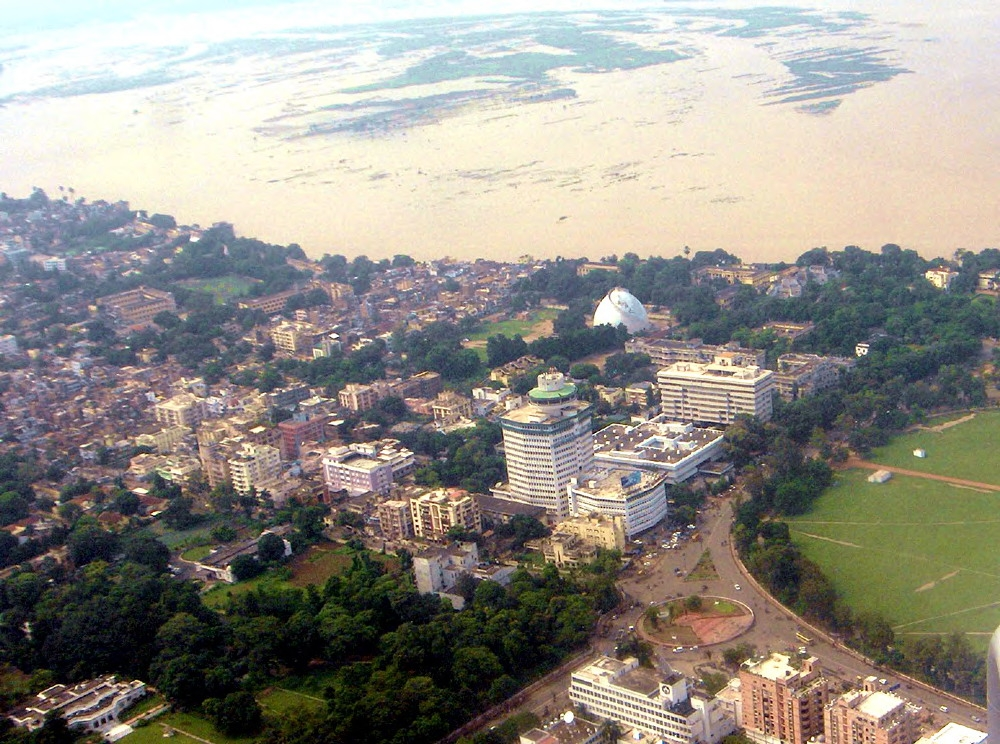
Bank of River Ganges

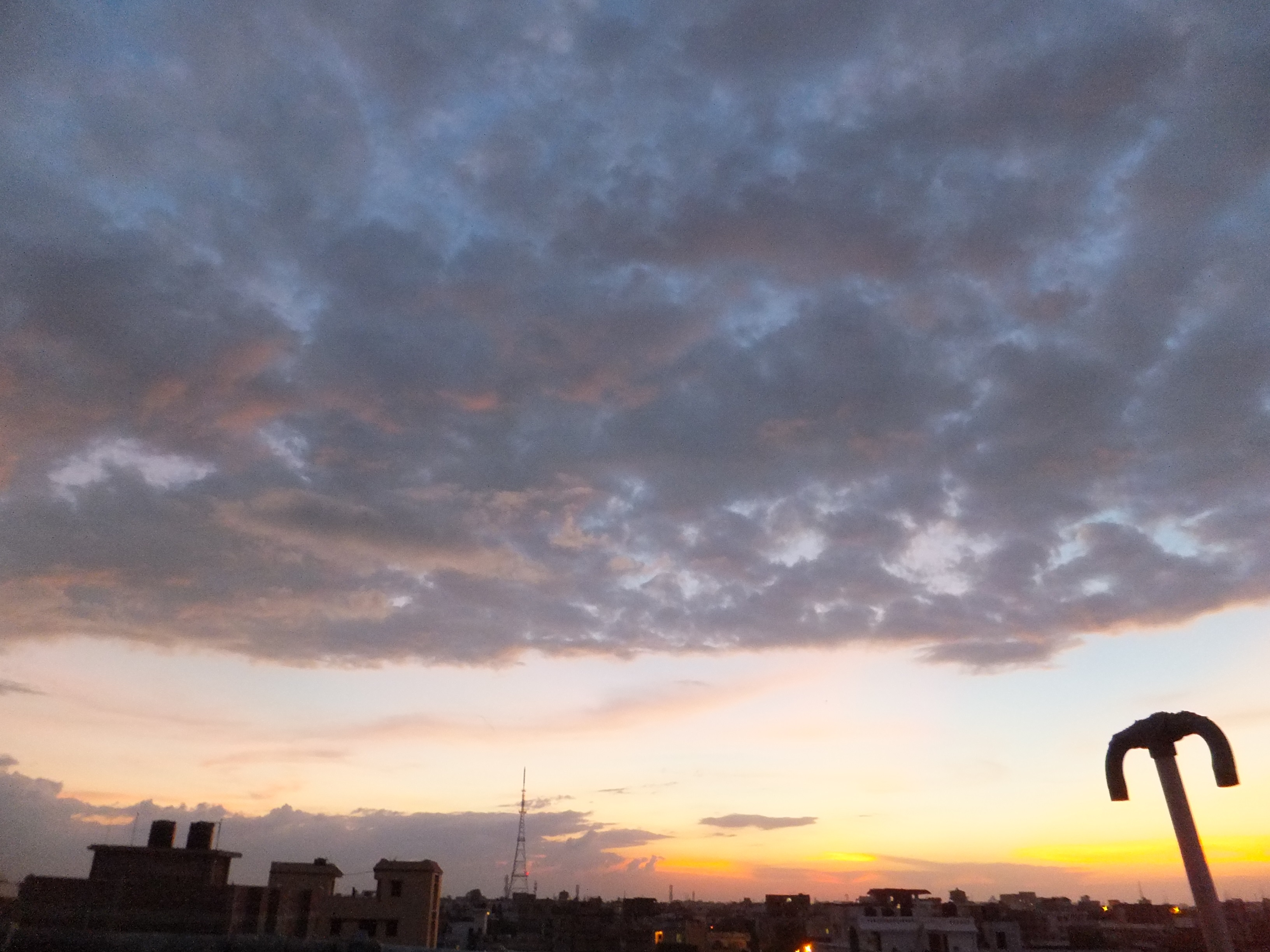
Monsoon clouds over Priyadarshi Nagar, a part of Kankarbagh- residential area in Eastern Patna.

Patna has a humid subtropical climate under the Köppen climate classification: (Cwa) with sweltering summers from late March to June, the monsoon season from late June to late September and chilly winter nights and foggy or sunny days from November to February. Highest temperature ever recorded was 46.6 °C (115.9 °F) in the year 1966, the lowest ever was 1.1 °C (34 °F) on 9 January 2013, and highest rainfall was 204.5 mm (8.05 in) in the year 1997.

The table below details historical monthly averages for climate variables.

Climate data for Patna Airport (1991–2020, extremes 1951–2013)
Month	Jan	Feb	Mar	Apr	May	Jun	Jul	Aug	Sep	Oct	Nov	Dec	Year
Record high °C (°F)	33.1 (91.6)	35.1 (95.2)	41.4 (106.5)	44.6 (112.3)	45.6 (114.1)	46.6 (115.9)	41.6 (106.9)	39.7 (103.5)	37.6 (99.7)	38.2 (100.8)	34.6 (94.3)	30.5 (86.9)	46.6 (115.9)
Mean daily maximum °C (°F)	22.1 (71.8)	26.1 (79.0)	32.2 (90.0)	37.1 (98.8)	37.5 (99.5)	36.4 (97.5)	33.4 (92.1)	33.1 (91.6)	32.6 (90.7)	32.1 (89.8)	29.1 (84.4)	24.3 (75.7)	31.3 (88.3)
Mean daily minimum °C (°F)	9.2 (48.6)	12.5 (54.5)	17.0 (62.6)	22.2 (72.0)	25.2 (77.4)	26.7 (80.1)	26.5 (79.7)	26.5 (79.7)	25.7 (78.3)	22.0 (71.6)	15.4 (59.7)	10.7 (51.3)	20.0 (68.0)
Record low °C (°F)	1.1 (34.0)	3.4 (38.1)	8.2 (46.8)	13.3 (55.9)	17.7 (63.9)	19.3 (66.7)	21.1 (70.0)	20.2 (68.4)	19.0 (66.2)	12.0 (53.6)	7.7 (45.9)	2.2 (36.0)	1.1 (34.0)
Average precipitation mm (inches)	10.2 (0.40)	12.6 (0.50)	8.9 (0.35)	11.9 (0.47)	48.4 (1.91)	162.2 (6.39)	289.1 (11.38)	266.6 (10.50)	209.7 (8.26)	49.7 (1.96)	5.3 (0.21)	4.7 (0.19)	1,077.6 (42.43)
Average rainy days	1.1	1.2	0.6	1.0	3.0	6.9	12.6	12.4	9.2	2.7	0.4	0.4	51.6
Average relative humidity (%) (at 17:30 IST)	67	53	38	33	43	59	74	76	76	69	67	72	61
Mean monthly sunshine hours	207.7	228.8	260.4	264.0	272.8	192.0	130.2	151.9	162.0	238.7	240.0	201.5	2,550
Mean daily sunshine hours	6.7	8.1	8.4	8.8	8.8	6.4	4.2	4.9	5.4	7.7	8.0	6.5	7.0
Average ultraviolet index	6	7	9	11	12	12	12	12	11	8	6	5	9
Source 1: India Meteorological Department (sun 1971–2000)
Source 2: Weather Atlas

=== Air pollution ===
Pollution is a major concern in Patna. According to the CAG report, tabled in the Bihar Legislative Assembly in April 2015, respirable suspended particulate matter (RSPM) level (PM-10) in Patna was 355, three-and-a-half times higher than the prescribed limit of 100 micro-gram per cubic metre, primarily due to high vehicular and industrial emissions and construction activities in the city. In May 2014, a World Health Organization survey declared Patna the second most air polluted city in India, only after Delhi, with the survey calculating the airborne particulate matter in the state capital's ambient air (PM-2.5) to be 149 micro-grams, six times more than the safe limit, which is 25 micro-grams. Severe air pollution in the city has caused a rise in pollution-related respiratory ailments, such as lung cancer, asthma, dysentery and diarrhoea. The dense smog in Patna during winter season results in major air and rail traffic disruptions every year.

Patna has been ranked 10th best "National Clean Air City" (under Category 1 >10L Population cities) in India according to 'Swachh Vayu Survekshan 2024 Results'

== Economy ==
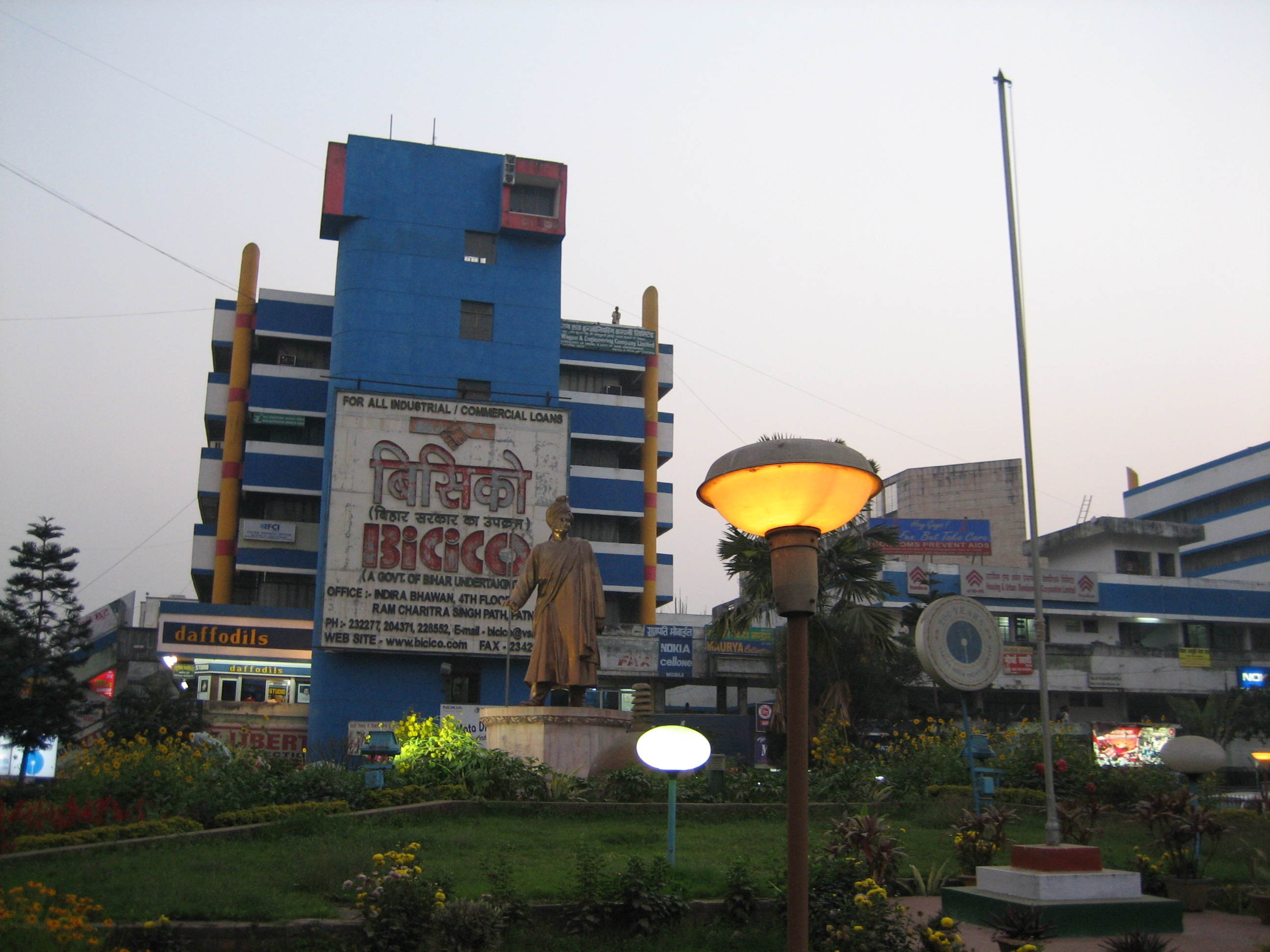
Maurya Lok is a major shopping area of the city, and one of the oldest

Since the 17th century, Patna has been a centre of international trade and an agricultural and textile hub, including a major silk and calico market. After gaining independence in 1947, the economy remained relatively stable, including growth in produce and manufacturing of vegetable oil. From the 1980s onwards, the economy experienced fluctuations. When liberalisation came to India in the 1990s, Patna did not attract significant global funds or foreign investment which proved a setback for the economy. Although the city had several fertiliser plants and sugar mills, due to a weakened ecosystem, many companies incurred losses and were eventually forced to close or leave the state.

The economy of Patna has seen sustained growth since 2005, in particular from the fast-moving consumer goods industry, the service sector, and Green Revolution businesses. In 2009, the World Bank ranked Patna as the second best city in India to start a business. In 2010, Patna was ranked 21st fastest-growing city in the world and fifth fastest-growing city in India, and was forecast to grow at an average annual rate of 3.72% through 2020.

Its largest exports are grain, sugarcane, sesame, and Patna rice, a local medium-grained variety. There are several sugar mills in and around Patna. Patna has been described as an important business and luxury brand centre of eastern India.

The major business districts of the city are Bander Bagicha, Exhibition Road, Gandhi Maidan Marg, Frazer Road, Indrapuri and Maurya Lok.

Many manufacturing companies, including Hero Cycles, Britannia Industries, PepsiCo, Sonalika Tractors and UltraTech Cement have established their manufacturing plants in the Patna metropolitan area. One of the world's largest leather clusters is in Fatuha, in Patna. Patna is also emerging as an information technology hub, including Tata Consultancy Services, which started operations in 2019 at a new Patna facility.

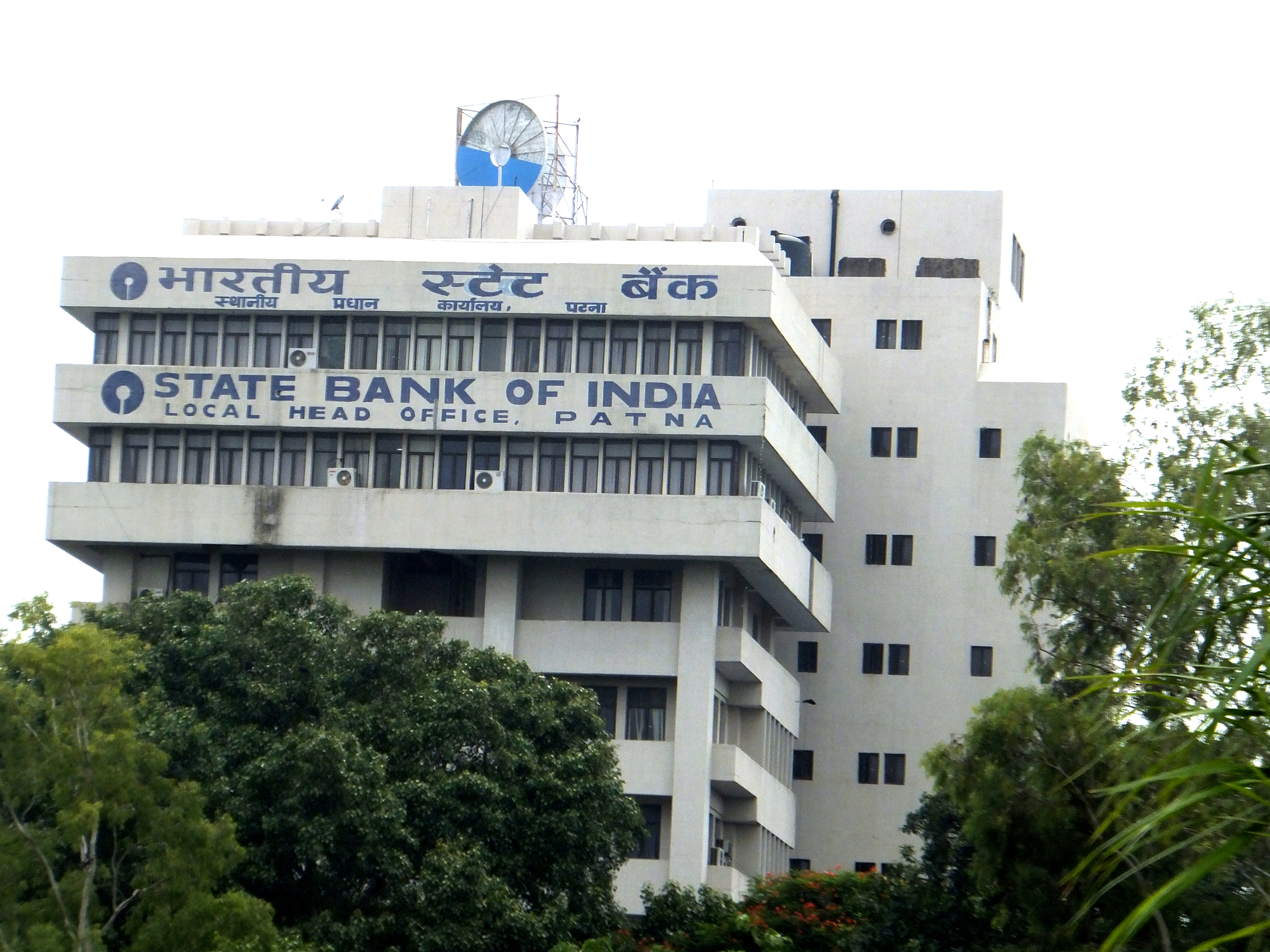
State Bank of India- Patna Regional office at East Gandhi Maidan Marg

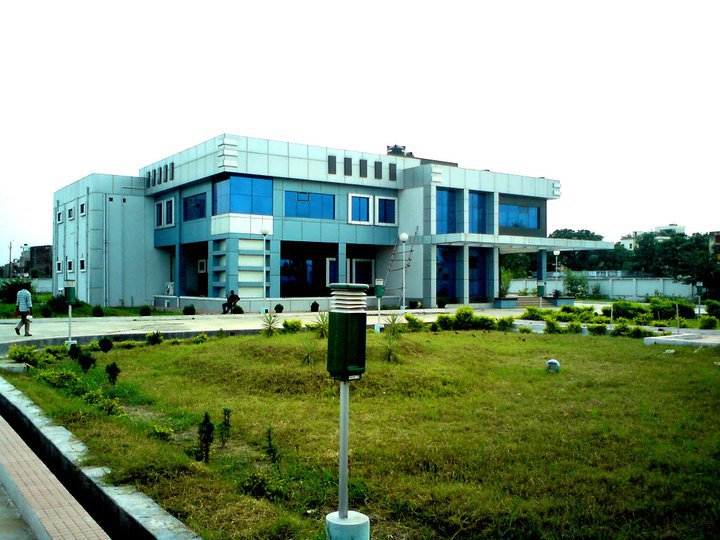
Software Technology Park of India, Patna

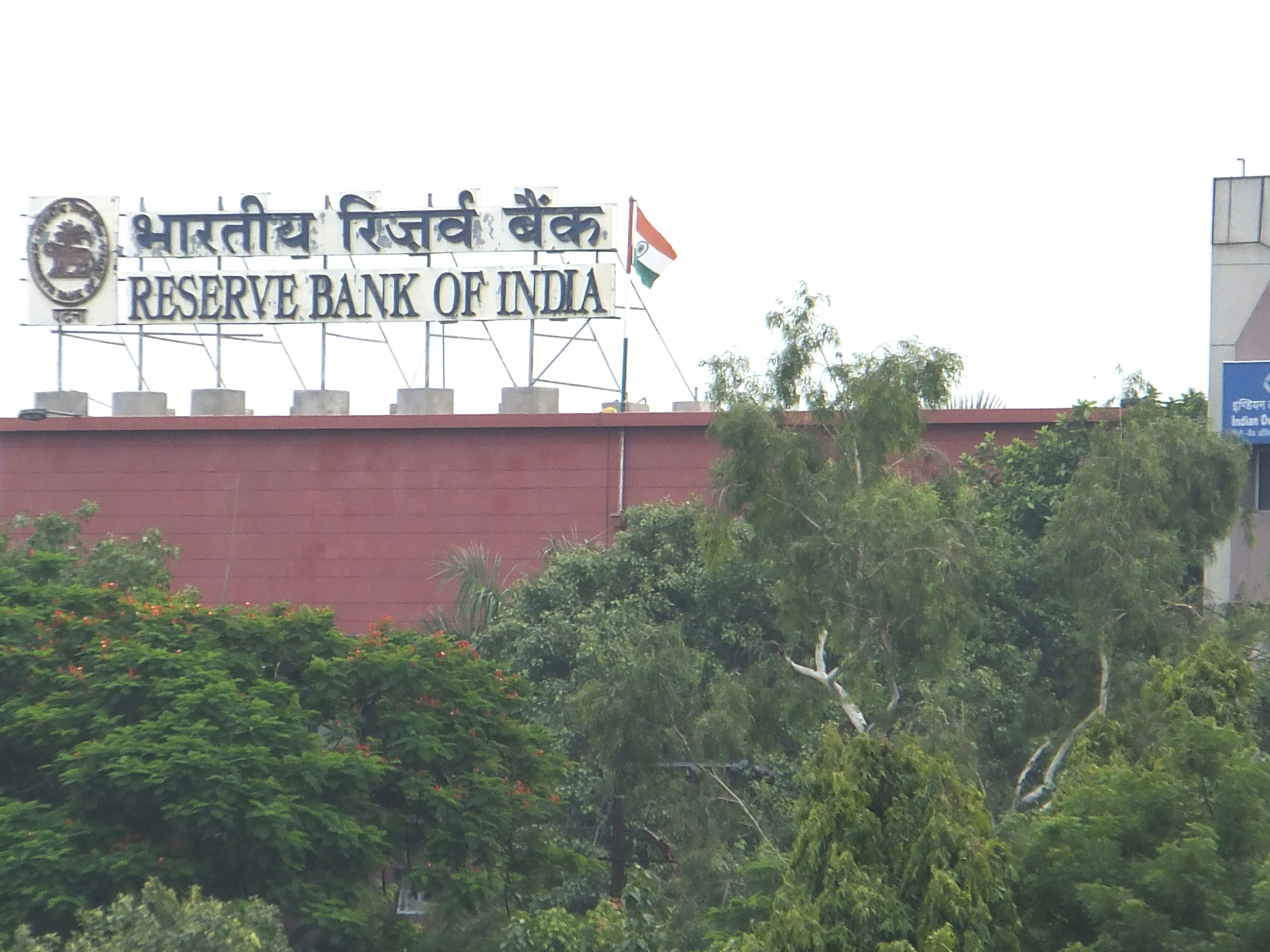
Reserve Bank of India's regional office at South Gandhi Maidan Marg, Patna

== Demographics ==
Historical population
Year	Pop.	±%
1807–14	312,000	—
1820	100,000	−67.9%
1865	284,100	+184.1%
1872	158,000	−44.4%
1881	170,684	+8.0%
1891	165,200	−3.2%
1901	134,785	−18.4%
1911	136,153	+1.0%
1921	119,976	−11.9%
1931	159,690	+33.1%
1941	196,415	+23.0%
1951	283,479	+44.3%
1961	364,594	+28.6%
1971	475,300	+30.4%
1981	813,963	+71.3%
1991	1,099,647	+35.1%
2001	1,376,950	+25.2%
2011	1,684,222	+22.3%
Note: Huge population decline after 1814 due to the decrease in the river borne trade, persistent unhealthiness and repeated epidemics of plaque. Source:

With an estimated population of 1.68 million in 2011, Patna is the 19th most populous city in India and with over 2 million people, its urban agglomeration is the 18th largest in India. Residents of Patna are referred to by the demonym Patnaite.

According to 2011 census data, Patna city had a population of 1,684,222 (before the expansion of the city limits) within the corporation limits, with 893,399 men and 790,823 women. This was a 22.3% increase compared to 2001 figures. 11.32% of the population was under six years of age, with 102,208 boys and 88,288 girls. The overall literacy rate is 83.37%, with the male literacy rate being 87.35% and female 79.89%. The sex ratio of Patna is 885 females per 1,000 males. The child sex ratio of girls is 877 per 1000 boys. The urban agglomeration had a population of 2,049,156, of which 1,087,285 are male and 961,871 are females with 82.73% literacy. Patna is the second largest city (in terms of population) in eastern India.

Roughly 0.25% of Patna's population lives in slums, which makes Patna the city with the lowest percentage of people living in slums in India. Like other fast-growing cities in the developing world, Patna suffers from major urbanisation problems including unemployment, poor public health, and poor civic and educational standards for a large section of the population. In 2015, the National Sample Survey Organisation revealed that, for females in India, Patna had the highest unemployment rate at 34.6%, and for males, it was the second highest with a rate of 8% in 2011–12.

=== Religion and language ===
Religion in Patna city (2011)
Religion	Percent
Hinduism	86.39%
Islam	12.27%
Christianity	0.51%
Other or not stated	0.83%

According to the 2011 census of India, 86.39% of Patna's residents practice Hinduism. Islam is the second most popular religion at 12.27%. Christianity, Jainism, Sikhism, and Buddhism are among the other minority religions. 0.01% practice other religions and 0.49% no particular religion.

Languages of Patna city (2011)
1. Hindi (65.9%)
2. Magahi (18.0%)
3. Urdu (9.67%)
4. Bhojpuri (3.19%)
5. Maithili (1.79%)
6. Others (1.37%)

Hindi and Urdu are official languages of the state of Bihar, but many other languages are also spoken. The native language is Magadhi or Magahi, named after Magadha, the ancient name of South Bihar, and is most widely spoken. Hindi is spoken by 65.94% of the population, 18.04% Magahi, 9.67% Urdu, 3.19% Bhojpuri and 1.79% Maithili as their first language.

== Administration ==
The Patna sub-division (Tehsil) is one of the 6 Tehsils of the Patna district. It is headed by an IAS or state Civil service officer of the rank of Sub Divisional Magistrate (SDM). The SDM of Patna Tehsil reports to the District Magistrate (DM) of Patna District.

=== Blocks ===
The Patna Tehsil is divided into 3 Blocks, each headed by a Block Development Officer (BDO). The list of Blocks is as follows:

1. Patna
2. Sampatchak
3. Phulwari Sharif

== Government ==
=== Civic administration ===
The civic administration of Patna is run by several government agencies and has overlapping structural divisions. At least five administrative definitions of the city are available; listed in ascending order of area: Patna division, Patna district (also the Patna Police area), the Patna Metropolitan Region (also known as Patna Planning area), "Greater Patna" or PRDA area, which adds to the PMC a few areas just adjacent to it and Patna Municipal Corporation area.

City officials
		Assumed office	Office	Source
Corporation Mayor	Sita Sahu, BJP	June 2017	Maurya Lok	
Corporation Commissioner	Animesh Kumar Parashar, IAS	November 2021	Maurya Lok	
Divisional Commissioner	Sanjay Kumar Agarwal, IAS	October 2019	Near Golghar, Gandhi Maidan	
District Magistrate	Dr.Chandrashekhar Singh, IAS	January 2021	Patna Collectorate	
Senior Superintendent of Police	Manavjit Singh Dhillon, IPS	January 2022	South Gandhi Maidan Marg	

The Patna Municipal Corporation, or PMC, oversees and manages the civic infrastructure of the city's 75 wards, which accommodates a population of 1.7 million as per 2011 Census. The municipal corporation consists of democratically elected members; each ward elects a Councillor to the PMC. The PMC is in charge of the civic and infrastructure needs of the metropolis.

As Patna's apex body, the corporation discharges its functions through the mayor-in-council, which comprises a mayor, a deputy mayor, and other elected members of the PMC. The Mayor is usually chosen through indirect election by the councillors from among themselves. The functions of the PMC include water supply, drainage and sewerage, sanitation, solid waste management, street lighting, and building regulation. The Municipal Commissioner is the chief Executive Officer and head of the executive arm of the Municipal Corporation. All executive powers are vested in the Municipal Commissioner who is an Indian Administrative Service (IAS) officer appointed by the state government. Although the Municipal Corporation is the legislative body that lays down policies for the governance of the city, it is the Commissioner who is responsible for the execution of the policies. The Commissioner is appointed for a fixed term as defined by state statute. The powers of the Commissioner are those provided by statute and those delegated by the Corporation or the Standing Committee. As of June 2017, the BJP won PMC Mayor seat; the mayor is Sita Sahu, while the deputy mayor is Vinay Kumar Pappu. The Patna Municipal Corporation was ranked 4th out of 21 Cities for best governance & administrative practices in India in 2014. It scored 3.6 on 10 compared to the national average of 3.3. The revenue district of Patna comes under the jurisdiction of a District Collector (District Magistrate). The Collectors are in charge of the general administration, property records and revenue collection for the Central Government, and oversee the national elections held in the city. The Bihar Urban Infrastructure Development Corporation Limited (BUIDCO) and the Patna Metropolitan Area Authority, are responsible for the statutory planning and development of the Patna Metropolitan Region. Patna Metropolitan Area Authority was established in 2016. It is the superseding agency for the former Patna Regional Development Authority (PRDA), which was dissolved in 2006. In addition to the city government, numerous commissions and state authorities—including the Ministry of Tourism, the Bihar Health Department, the Bihar Water Resources Department, National Ganga River Basin Authority, Bihar State Pollution Control Board and the Bihar Public Service Commission—play a role in the life of Patnaites. As the capital of Bihar, Patna plays a major role 8n both state politics and central politics.

In October 2016, the Bihar cabinet approved the Patna Master Plan 2031, which envisages the development of a new airport at Bihta. As of August 2015, the area of Patna city (along with its urban agglomeration) is 250 square kilometres (97 sq mi). Patna Master 2031 is the second master plan of the city that has been passed ever, after the last plan was approved for 1961-1981. Patna master plan covers six urban local bodies - Patna Municipal Corporation, Danapur Nagar Parishad, Phulwarisharif Nagar Parishad, Khagaul Nagar Parishad, Maner Nagar Panchayat and Fatuha Nagar Parishad. The new master plan proposed to increase the area of Patna city to 1,167 square kilometres (451 sq mi) to transform it as a metropolitan city. 5 satellite towns have also been proposed in the master plan at Bihta, Naubatpur, Punpun, Fatuha and Khusrupur.

Patna has been selected as one of the hundred Indian cities to be developed as a smart city under Government of India's flagship Smart Cities Mission. With the grade of a Smart City, Patna will have highly up-to-date and radical provisions like uninterrupted electric supply, first-rate traffic and transport system, superior health care and many other prime utilities. Under this scheme, the city will use digital technology that will act as the integral mechanism of the aforesaid facilities and thereby further elevate the lifestyle of the citizens. A special purpose vehicle company named the Patna Smart City Limited has been formed to implement the smart city projects. On 22 November 2017, Eptisa Servicios de Ingenieria SL of Spain was chosen as the project management consultant.

=== Municipal finance ===
According to financial data published on the CityFinance Portal of the Ministry of Housing and Urban Affairs, the Patna Municipal Corporation reported total revenue receipts of ₹503 crore (US$60 million) and total expenditure of ₹494 crore (US$59 million) in 2022–23. Tax revenue accounted for about 11.9% of the total revenue, while the corporation received ₹293 crore in grants during the financial year.

== Politics ==
As the seat of the Government of Bihar, The city has several federal facilities, including the Raj Bhavan: Governor's house, the Bihar Legislative Assembly; the state secretariat, which is housed in the Patna Secretariat; and the Patna High Court. The Patna High Court is one of the oldest High Court in India. The Patna High Court has jurisdiction over the state of Bihar. Patna also has lower courts; the Small Causes Court for civil matters, and the Sessions Court for criminal cases. The Patna Police, commanded by Senior Superintendent of Police, is overseen by the Bihar Government's Home Department. The Patna district elects two representatives to India's lower house, the Lok Sabha, and 14 representatives to the state legislative assembly. The capital city of Patna has 8 State Legislative Assembly constituencies, which form two constituencies of the Lok Sabha (the lower house of the Parliament of India).

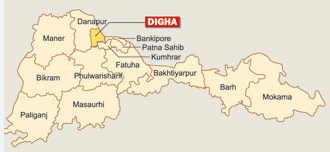
8 State Legislative Assembly constituencies in capital city of Patna

City representatives (Legislators)
Member	Party	Constituency	Source
Ravi Shankar Prasad, MP	BJP	Patna Sahib	
Misa Bharti, MP	RJD	Pataliputra	
Sanjiv Chaurasiya, MLA	BJP	Digha	
Prashant Kishore, MLA	JSP	Bankipur	
Nand Kishore Yadav, MLA	BJP	Patna Sahib	
Arun Kumar Sinha, MLA	BJP	Kumhrar	
Rama Nand Yadav, MLA	RJD	Fatuha	
Ram Kripal Yadav, MLA	BJP	Danapur	
Shyam Rajak, MLA	JD(U)	Phulwari	
Bhai Virendra, MLA	RJD	Maner	

== Utility services ==
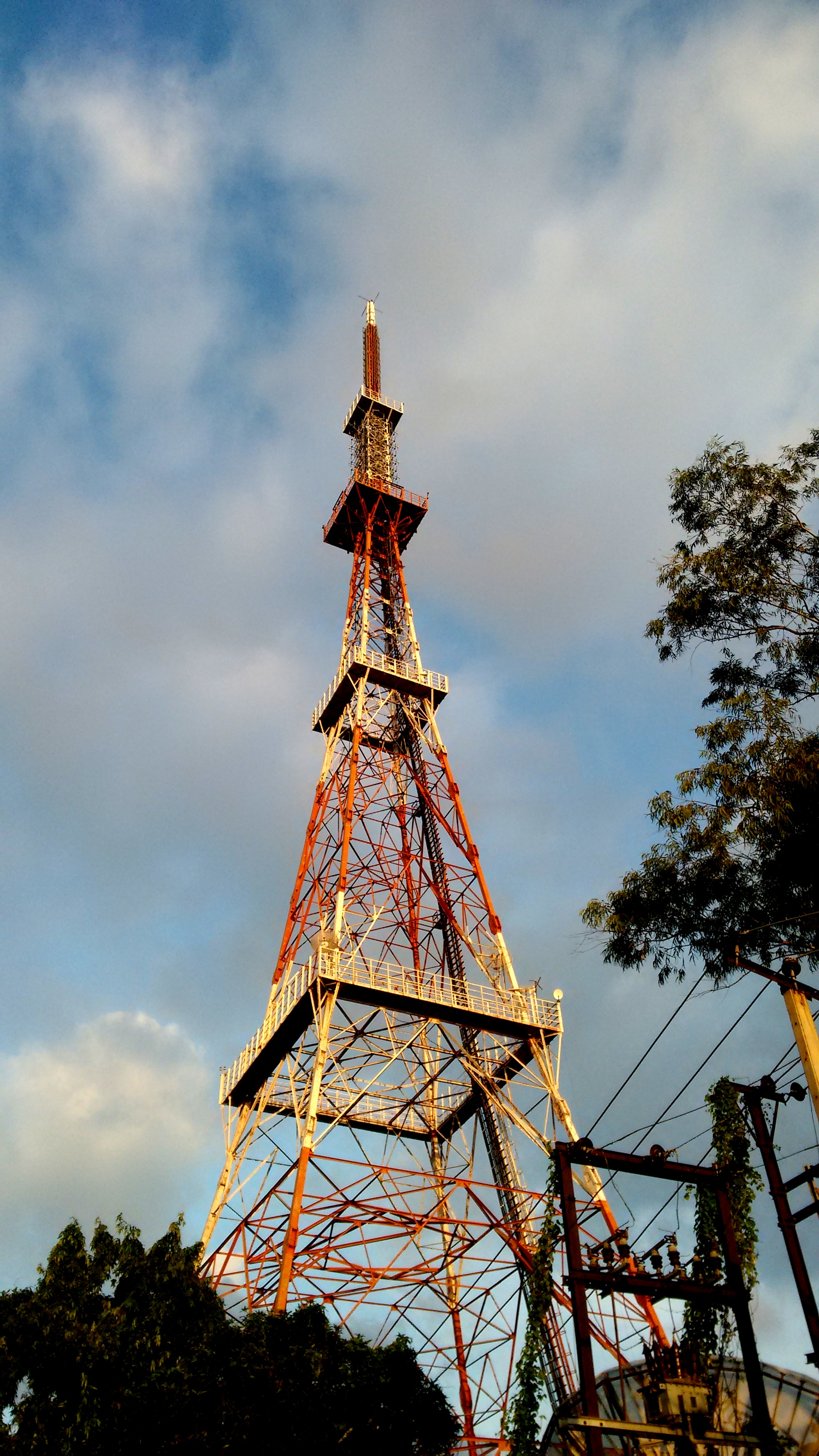
Bhootnath Road TV Tower broadcasts programming to Patna

Groundwater fulfills the basic needs of the people, administered by Patna Jal Parishad under Patna Municipal Corporation. The public water supply system comprises 98 tube wells that pump water directly to the distribution mains. Around 23 overhead reservoirs of which only the ones at Agam Kuan, Gulzarbagh Press, Guru Gobind Singh Hospital and High Court serve the city. The sewerage system in Patna was set up in 1936. At present, there are four sewage treatment plants at Saidpur, Beur, Pahari and Karmali Chak. In 2019, the central government has started the process Nirmal Ganga, which is to build new sewerage infrastructure at Patna's Karmalichak as well as in Barh, Naugachia and Sultanganj. The new infrastructure will be capable of preventing the flow of 67 million litre of sewage into Ganga.

As of 2011, the city's electricity consumption is about 601 kWh per capita, even though the actual demand is much higher. Electricity supply to the city is regulated and distributed by the South Bihar Power Distribution Company Limited managed by Bihar State Power Holding Company Limited (the holding company and a successor company of erstwhile Bihar State Electricity Board). The city forms the Patna Electric Supply Undertaking (PESU) Circle, which is further divided into two wings namely Patna East (consists Kankarbagh, Patna City, Gulzarbagh, Bankipore, Rajendra Nagar Divisions) and Patna West (Consists Danapur, New Capital, Pataliputra, Gardanibagh, Dak Bungalow divisions).

Direct–to–home (DTH) is available via DD Free Dish, Airtel digital TV, Dish TV, Tata Sky, Videocon d2h, Sun Direct and Reliance Digital TV. Cable companies include Darsh Digital Network Pvt. Ltd., SITI Maurya Cablenet Pvt. Ltd etc. The Conditional Access System for cable television was implemented in March 2013.

Patna comes under the Patna Telecom District of the Bharat Sanchar Nigam Limited (BSNL), India's state-owned telecom and internet services provider. Both Global System for Mobile Communications (GSM) and Code division multiple access (CDMA) mobile services are available. Apart from telecom, BSNL also provides broadband internet service. Among private enterprises, Bharti Airtel, Reliance Jio, Reliance GSM/CDMA, Idea Cellular, Aircel, Tata Teleservices (Tata DoCoMo, Virgin Mobile and Tata Indicom), Telenor (Formerly Uninor & Now Acquired by Bharti Airtel), Vodafone and Videocon Telecom are the leading telephone and cell phone service providers in the city.

Patna was the second Indian city, after Bangalore, which offered free WiFi connectivity to its citizens in February 2014. By surpassing the previous record-holder, Beijing in China, Patna's WiFi zone is the world's longest free WiFi zone, which covers a 20-km stretch from NIT Patna on Ashok Rajpath to Danapur.

== Transport ==
=== Roads ===
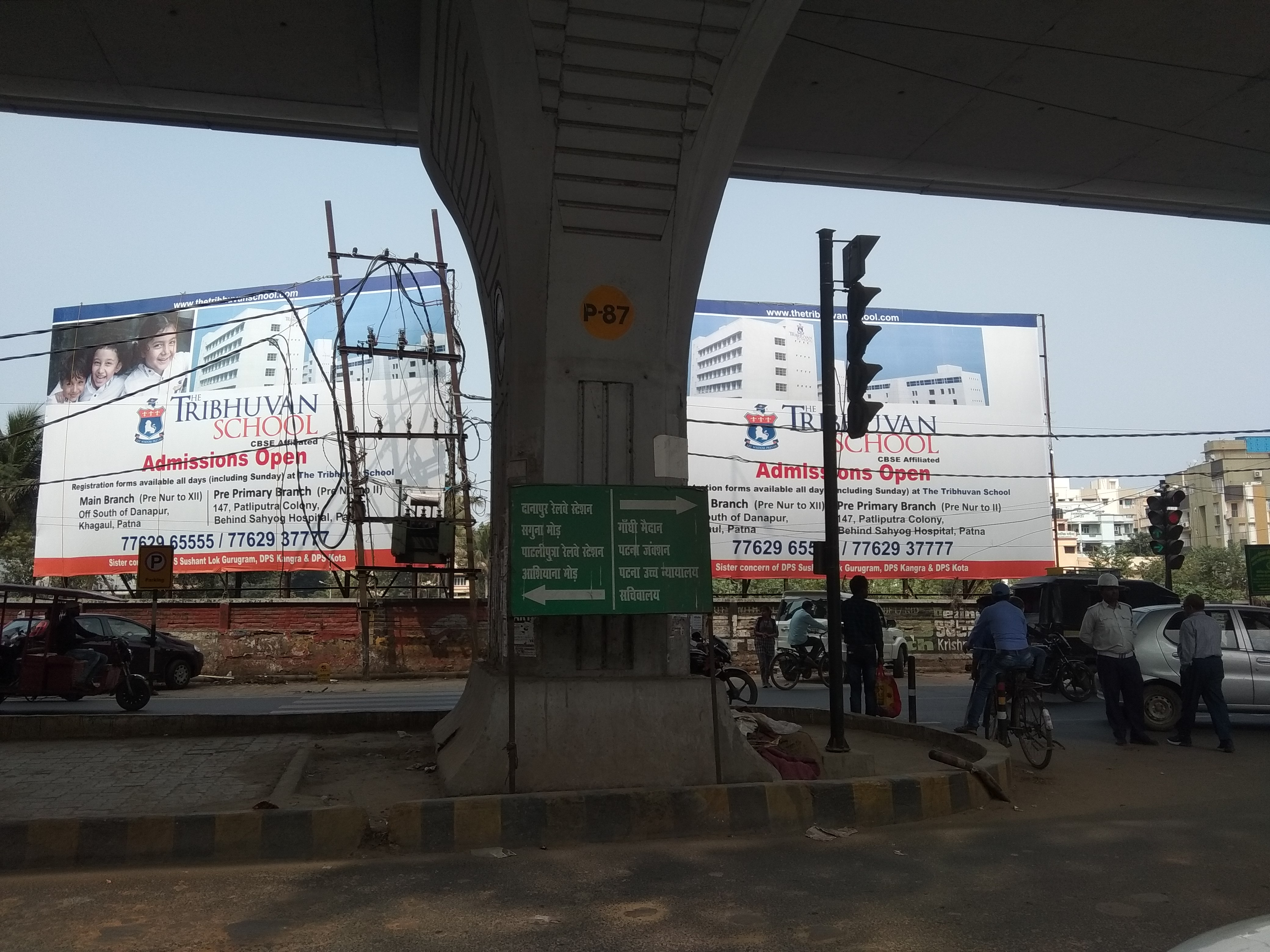
Bihar's longest flyover from Jagdeo Path Mor to Sheikhpura Mor in Bailey Road, Patna

Chiriyatand Flyover at Patna, one of the many new ones that have come up in the city recently.

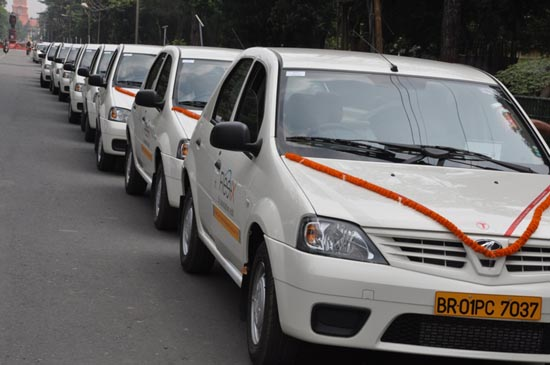
Radio Taxis

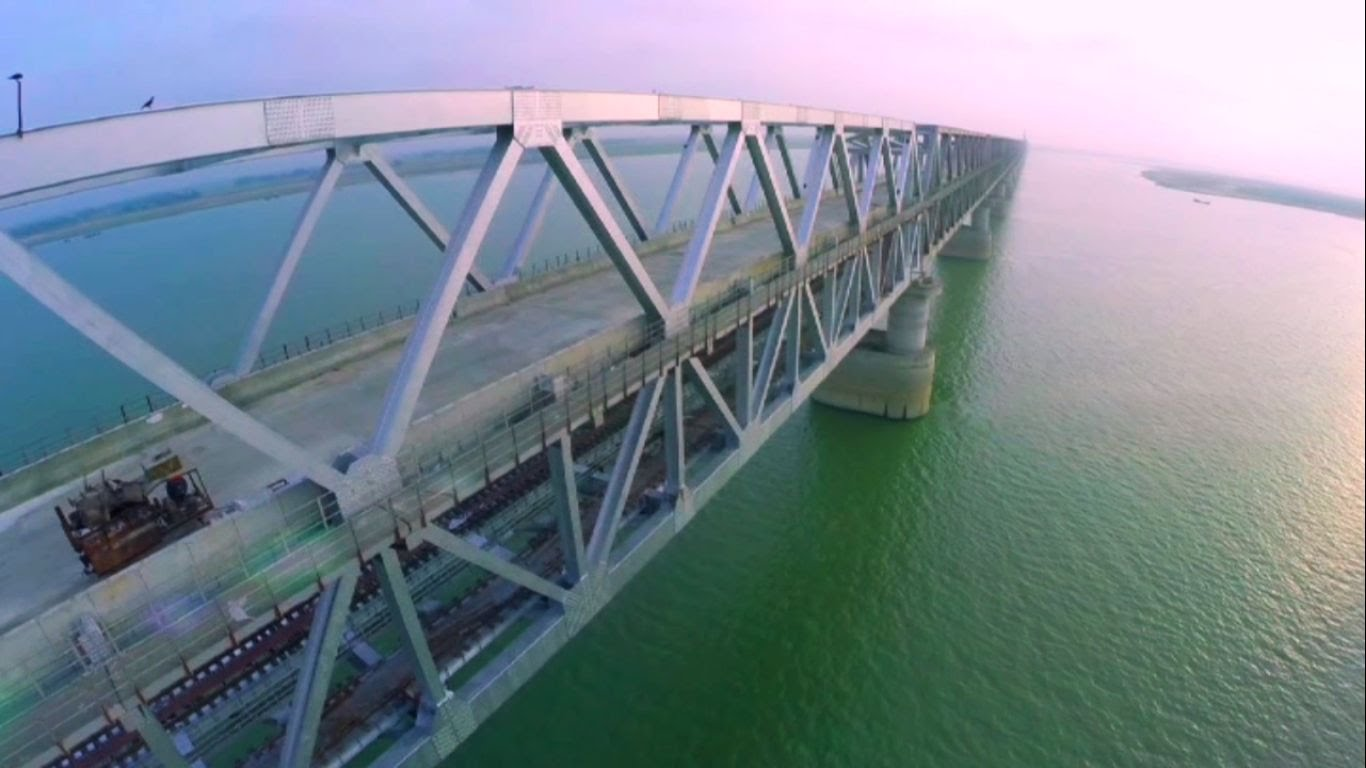
Digha–Sonpur Bridge connecting Patna with North Bihar.

Patna is about 100 km south of national East – West Highway corridor. The NH 30, NH 31 and NH 2 passes through the city. The Ashok Rajpath, Patna-Danapur Road, Bailey Road, Harding Road and Kankarbagh old bypass Road are the major corridors. Patna was one of the first places in India to use horse-drawn trams for public transport. Public transportation is provided for by buses, auto rickshaws and local trains. Auto rickshaws are said to be the lifeline of the city. BSRTC has started City bus service on all major routes of Patna. App based cab service is available within city. Patna is about 70.02KM away from Chhapra

=== Air transport ===
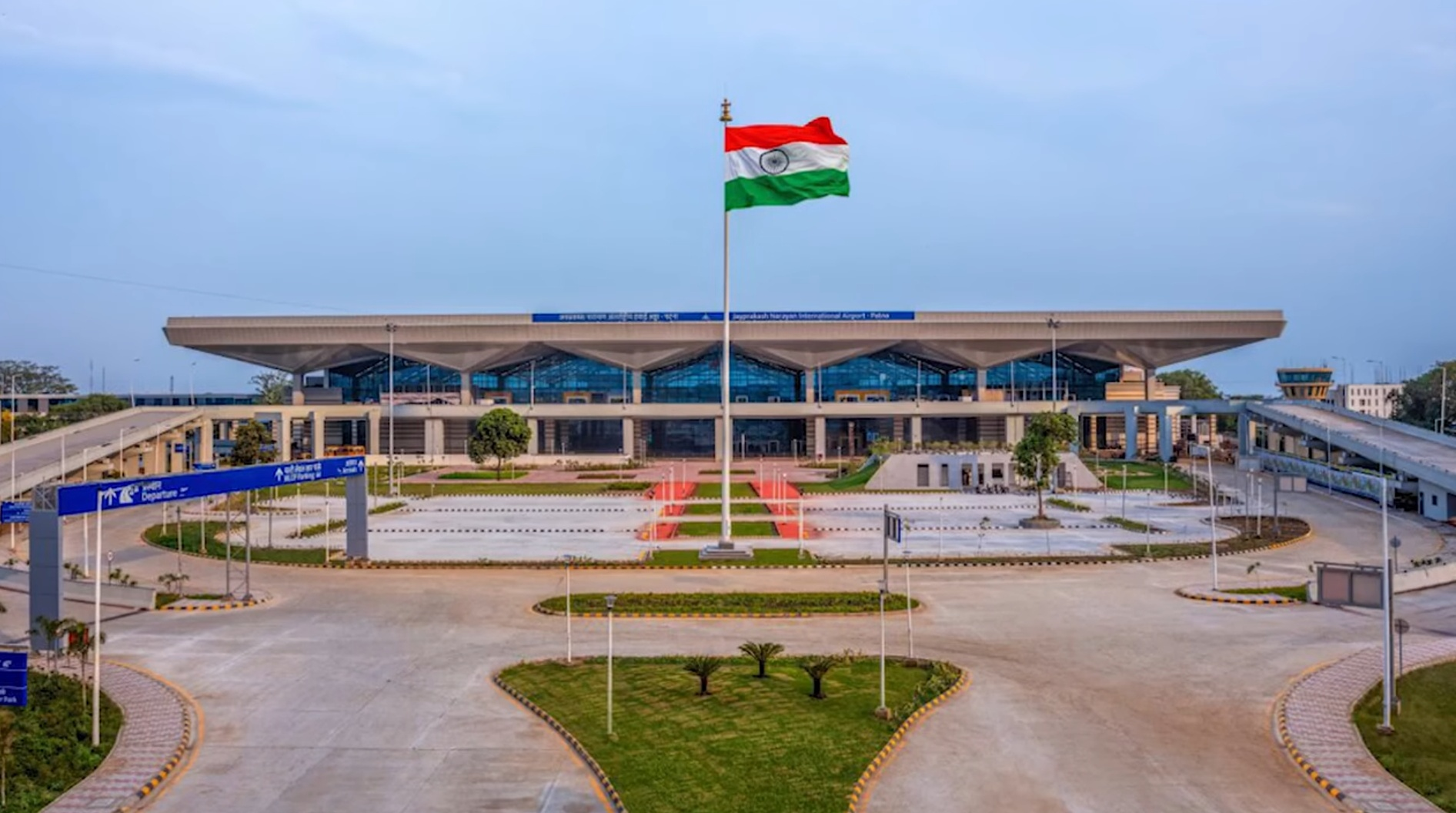
Jay Prakash Narayan International Airport, Patna

Patna Airport known as Lok Nayak Jayaprakash Narayan International Airport is classified as a restricted international airport. The arrival of several low-cost carriers and a number of new destinations have caused a growth in air traffic in recent years, as has an improvement in the situation with regard to law and order. For the period April to December 2009 the airport ranked first in a survey of 46 airports in the country in terms of percentage growth of domestic passengers as well as domestic aircraft movement. The Airport Authority of India (AAI) has proposed to develop a civil enclave at Bihta Air Force Station to serve as the new airport for Patna. The military airfield lies 40 kilometres (25 mi) southwest of Patna, in Bihta.

=== Railways ===
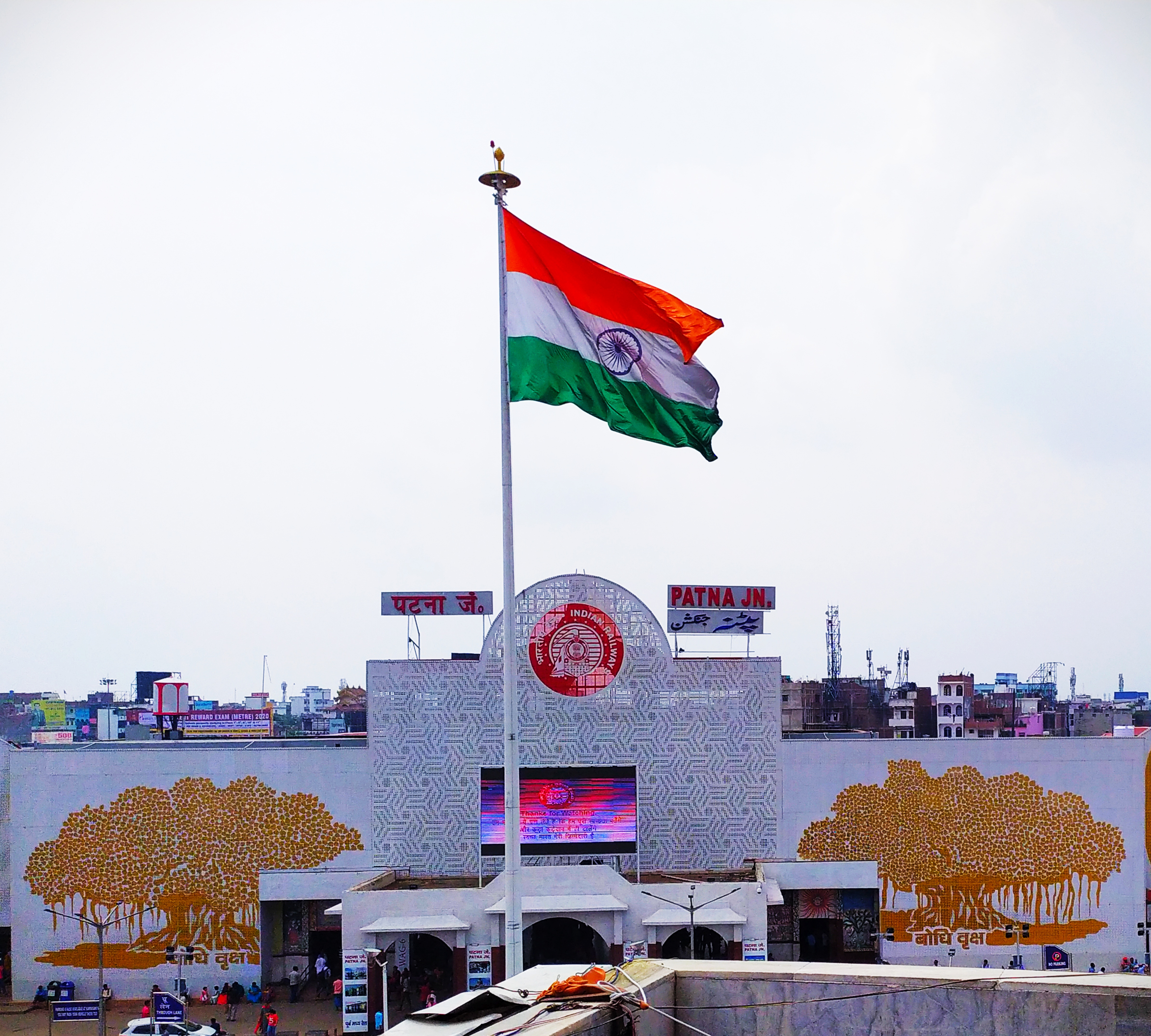
Patna Junction Railway Station, Patna

Patna is served by several railway stations within. The Patna Junction railway station is the main railway station of the city, and one of the busiest railway stations in India. Patna lies in between New Delhi and Kolkata on Howrah–Delhi main line, which is one of the busiest rail routes in India. Patna Junction is directly connected to most of the major cities in India. The city has four additional major railway stations: Rajendra Nagar Terminal (adjacent to Kankarbagh), Patliputra Junction (near Bailey road), Danapur (near western outskirts) and Patna Sahib (in Patna City area). Danapur is the divisional headquarters of East Central Railway zone's Danapur railway division. Patna is well connected with Gaya, Jehanabad, Bihar Sharif, Rajgir, Islampur, Jamalpur Junction and Munger through daily passenger and express train services. India's longest road-cum-rail bridge, Digha–Sonpur Bridge, across the Ganges River, connects Digha, Patna to Pahleja Ghat in Sonpur. The bridge was completed in 2015, and is 4.55 kilometres (2.83 miles) long, therefore the second longest rail-cum-road bridge in India, after Bogibeel Bridge in Assam.

The city is served by several major road highways and state highways, including National Highways 19, 30, 31, and 83. Pataliputra Bus Terminal is an upcoming ISBT. Asia's longest river bridge, the Mahatma Gandhi Setu (built 1982), is in Patna and connects the city to Hajipur across the Ganga. In recent times, the bridge has been witnessing major traffic chaos and accidents due to excessive numbers of vehicles passing over it and regularly overloading the structure. A new six lane road bridge across the Ganges parallel to Mahatma Gandhi Setu is already been completed and in use which is connecting Kacchi Dargah in Patna City to Bidupur in Vaishali district, which is the longest bridge in India. Patna is well connected with roads to various major cities of Bihar like Hajipur, Munger, Jamalpur, Bhagalpur, Gaya Motihari, and Purnia.

Patna is 1,015 kilometres (631 miles) east from Delhi, 1,802 kilometres (1,120 miles) northeast from Mumbai,1,527 kilometres (949 miles) north from Hyderabad and 556 kilometres (345 miles) northwest from Kolkata. Luxury bus service between Patna and several neighbouring cities is provided by the Bihar State Tourism Development Corporation and the Bihar State Road Transport Corporation. Auto rickshaws are a popular mode of transportation. Prepaid auto services operated by an all-women crew was started in 2013 in Patna, which is the first of its kind in India. Radio Taxi services are available within city limits and surrounding areas. There are also private options such as Ola Cabs.

=== Metro ===
Patna Metro is an operational rapid transit system for the city. It is owned and operated by state run Patna Metro Rail Corporation. It had been constructed on Public Private Partnership (PPP) mode, estimated to cost ₹140 billion (US$1 billion). It had 5 lines with a total planned length of 60 kilometres (37 mi), which will be built in 3 phases. Patna Monorail Project covering the municipal area is also underway. Recently the central government approved Patna metro rail project comprising two corridors (Danapur - Khemnichak and Patna Junction - Pataliputra Bus Terminal).

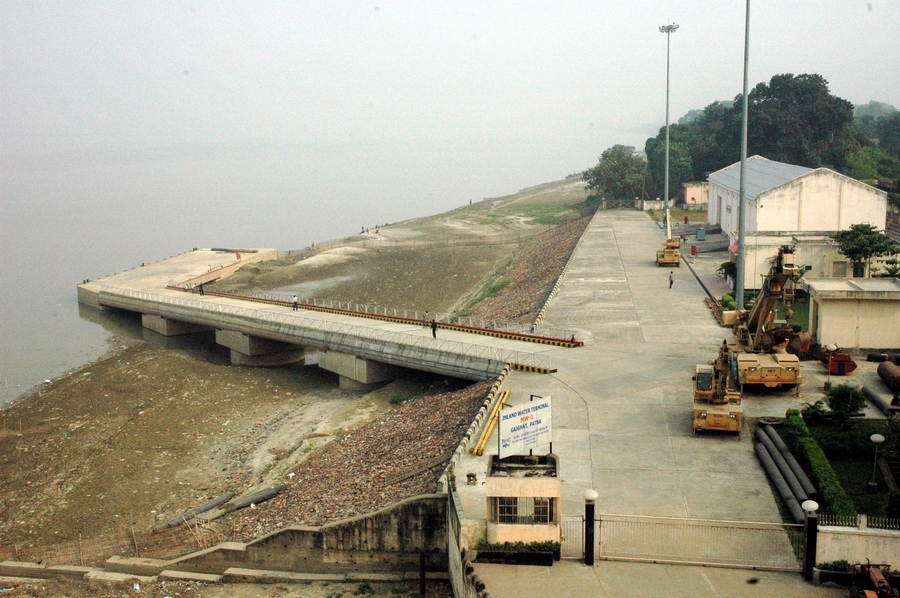
River Port on National Waterway 1 at Gai Ghat, Patna

The Ganges – navigable throughout the year – was the principal river highway across the vast Indo-Gangetic Plain. Vessels capable of accommodating five hundred merchants were known to ply this river in the ancient period; it served as a major trade route, as goods were transported from Pataliputra to the Bay of Bengal and further, to ports in Sri Lanka and Southeast Asia. The role of the Ganges as a channel for trade was enhanced by its natural links – it embraces all the major rivers and streams in both north and south Bihar. In recent times, Inland Waterways Authority of India has declared the stretch of river Ganges between Allahabad and Haldia National Inland Waterway and has taken steps to restore and maintain its navigability. The National Waterway-1, the longest Waterway in India, stretches 1620 km in the River Ganga from Allahabad to Haldia via Varanasi, Munger, Bhagalpur passes through Patna. This National Waterways has fixed terminal at Patna.

== Culture ==
Magahi folk singers

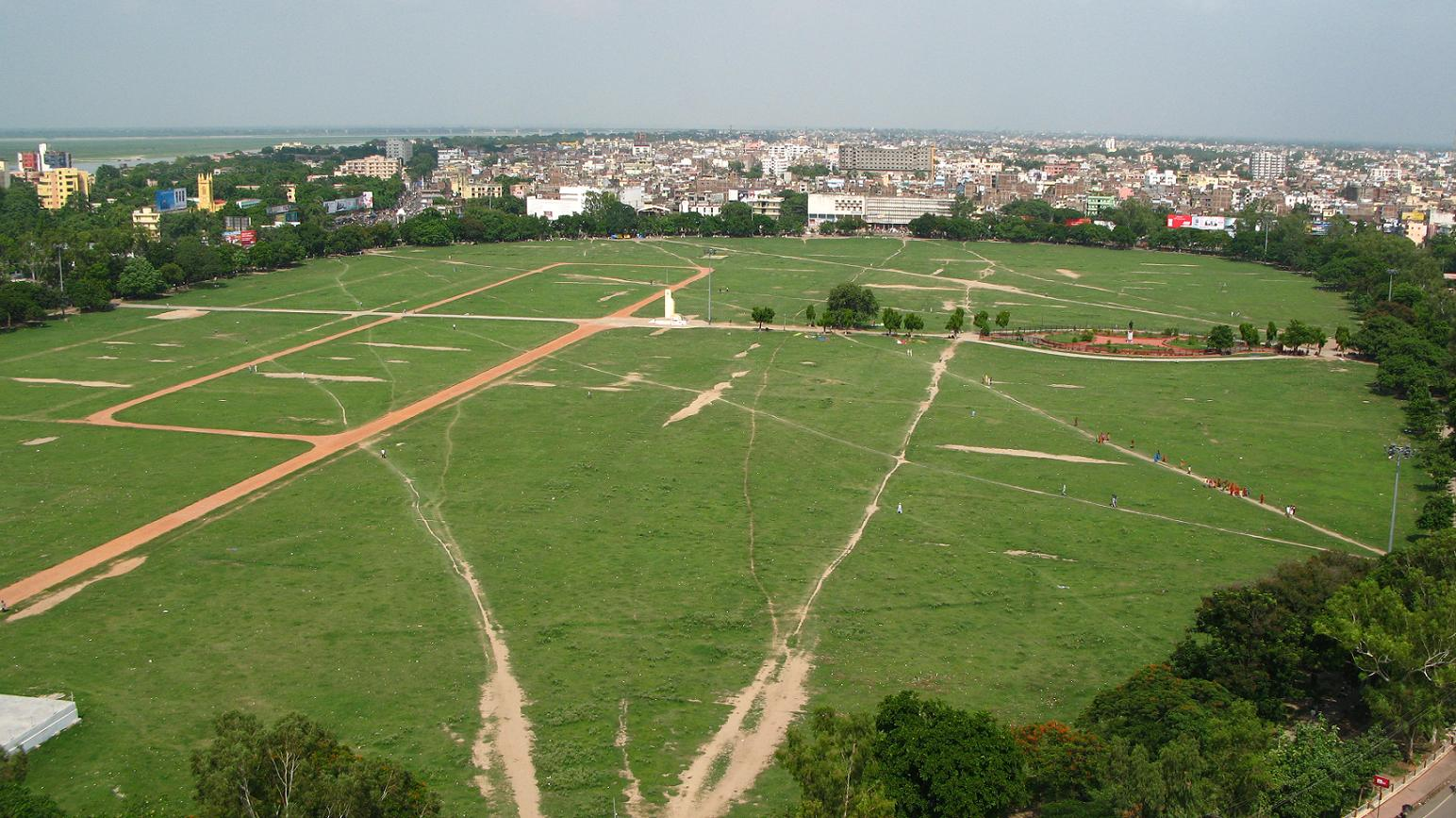
Gandhi Maidan (shown above) lies in the heart of Patna and is the site for most political and social functions in the city.

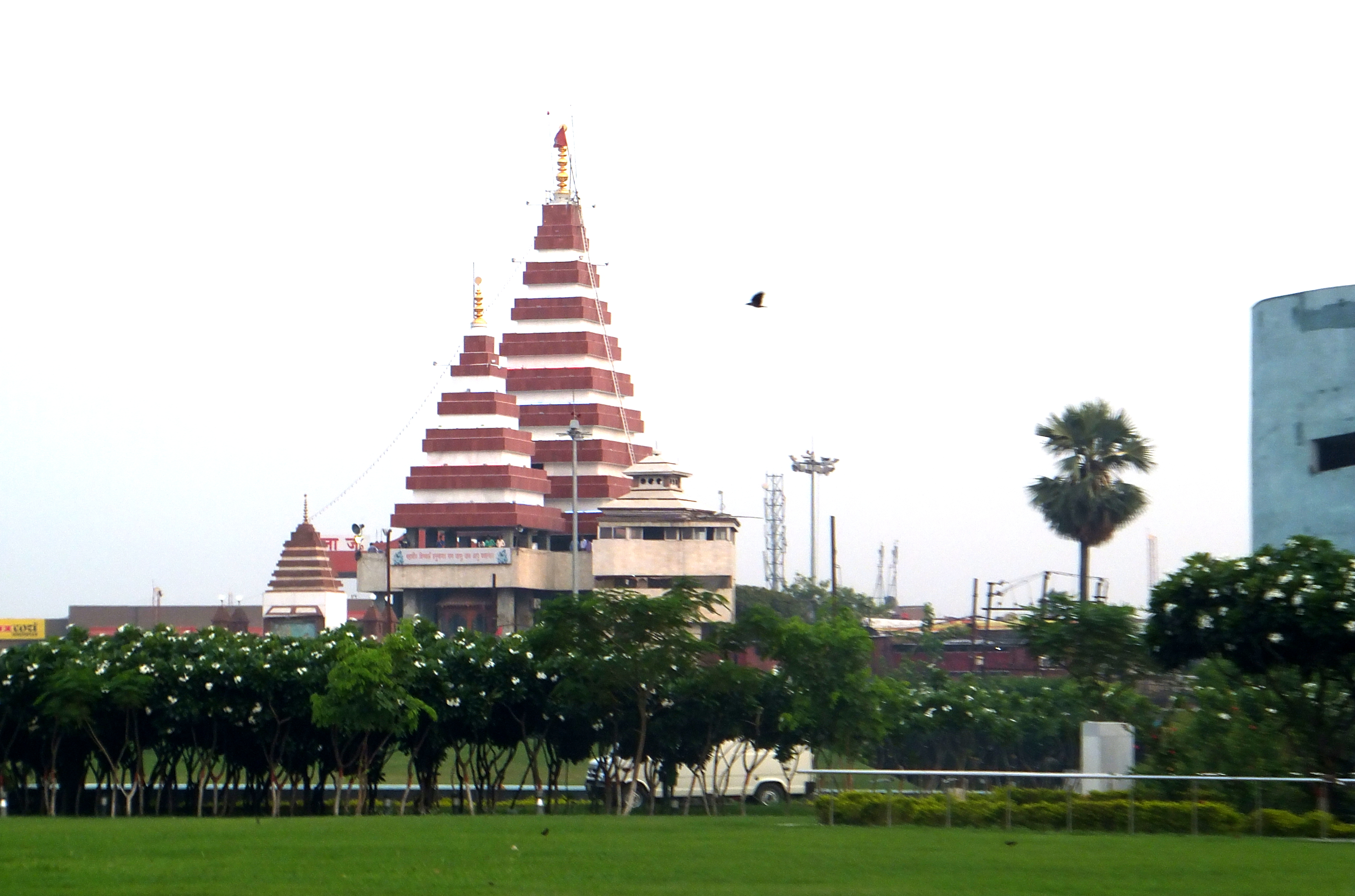
The Mahavir Mandir is a famous temple in Patna.

Patna's native language is Magahi or Magadhi a language derived from the ancient Magadhi Prakrit, which was created in the ancient kingdom of Magadha, the core of which was the area of Patna south of the Ganges. It is believed to be the language spoken by Gautama Buddha. Patna has a vibrant Bengali culture too with many Bengali stalwarts including the first Chief Minister of post-independence West Bengal, Bidhan Chandra Ray, being born here. The numerous Bengali speaking Patnaites have contributed massively into fine arts, culture, education and history of Bihar in general and Patna in particular. However, Magahi was the official language of the Mauryan court, in which the edicts of Ashoka were composed.

The name Magahi is directly derived from the name Magadhi Prakrit, and educated speakers of Magahi prefer to call it "Magadhi" rather than "Magahi".

Patna has many buildings adorned with Indo-Islamic and Indo-Saracenic architectural motifs. Several well-maintained major buildings from the colonial period have been declared "heritage structures"; others are in various stages of decay. Established in 1917 as the Bihar's first museum, the Patna Museum (पटना संग्रहालय) houses large collections that showcase Indian natural history and Indian art. The Khuda Bakhsh Oriental Library and Sinha Library are historic public libraries of Patna.

Several theatres are in or near the central part of the city, including the Bhartiya Nritya Kala Mandir, the Rabindra Parishad, Premchand Rangshala and the Kalidas Rangalaya, which is home to the Bihar art theatre. Kalidas Rangalaya also hosts the Patliputra Natya Mahotsav, a dance festival. But in the last two decades, the popularity of commercial theatres in the city has declined.

The Patna School of Painting or Patna Qalaam, some times also called Company style, is an offshoot of the well-known Mughal Miniature school of painting, which flourished in Bihar during the early 18th to the mid-20th centuries. The practitioners of this art form were descendants of Hindu artisans of Mughal painting who facing persecution under the Mughal Emperor Aurangzeb and who found refuge, via Murshidabad, in Patna during the late 18th century. The Patna painters differed from the Mughal painters, whose subjects included only royalty and court scenes, in that they included as subjects bazaar scenes, scenes of Indian daily life, local dignitaries, festivals and ceremonies, and nature scenes. The paintings were executed in watercolours on paper and on mica, but the style was generally of a hybrid and undistinguished quality. It is this school of painting that inspired the formation of the College of Arts and Crafts, Patna, under the leadership of Shri Radha Mohan, which is an important centre of fine arts in Bihar.

Bihar Government is promoting its art and culture through Madhubani arts to educate people about Bihar's rich cultural diversity.

Some well known dishes of Bihari cuisine include sattu paratha (parathas stuffed with roasted gram flour), "sattu ka sharbat" (a spiced drink with roasted gram flour as main ingredient), chokha (spicy mashed potatoes), fish curry, Bihari kebab, postaa-dana kaa halwaa, malpua, dal pitha (Similar to momos), kheer makhana (fox nut) and thekua/khajuria (a type of snack).

Street foods such as samosa, chaat, jalebi, litti chokha, phuchka (a deep-fried crêpe with tamarind sauce), South Indian and Chinese cuisine are favourite among Patnaites. The Taj Hotel Patna at Budh Marg Lodipur finished construction in 2024.

Bihari Women have traditionally worn cotton sari but shalwar kameez and other western attire are gaining acceptance among younger women. Western attire has gained wide acceptance among the urban men, although the traditional dhoti and kurta are seen during festivals. Chhath, also called Dala Chhath, is a major ancient festival in Bihar. It is celebrated twice a year: once in the summer, called the Chaiti Chhath, and once about a week after Deepawali, called the Kartik Chhath. Durga Puja, held in September–October, is Patna's another important festival; it is an occasion for glamorous celebrations. Among the city's other festivals, are Saraswati Puja, Eid, Holi, Christmas, Vishwakarma Puja, Makar Sankranti, Raksha Bandhan and Rath Yatra. Cultural events include the Patna Book Fair, Patna Sahib Mahotsav, the Patna Film Festival, Bihar Diwas, Rajgir Mahotsav, Vaishali Mahotsav and the Sonepur Cattle Fair in neighbouring towns.

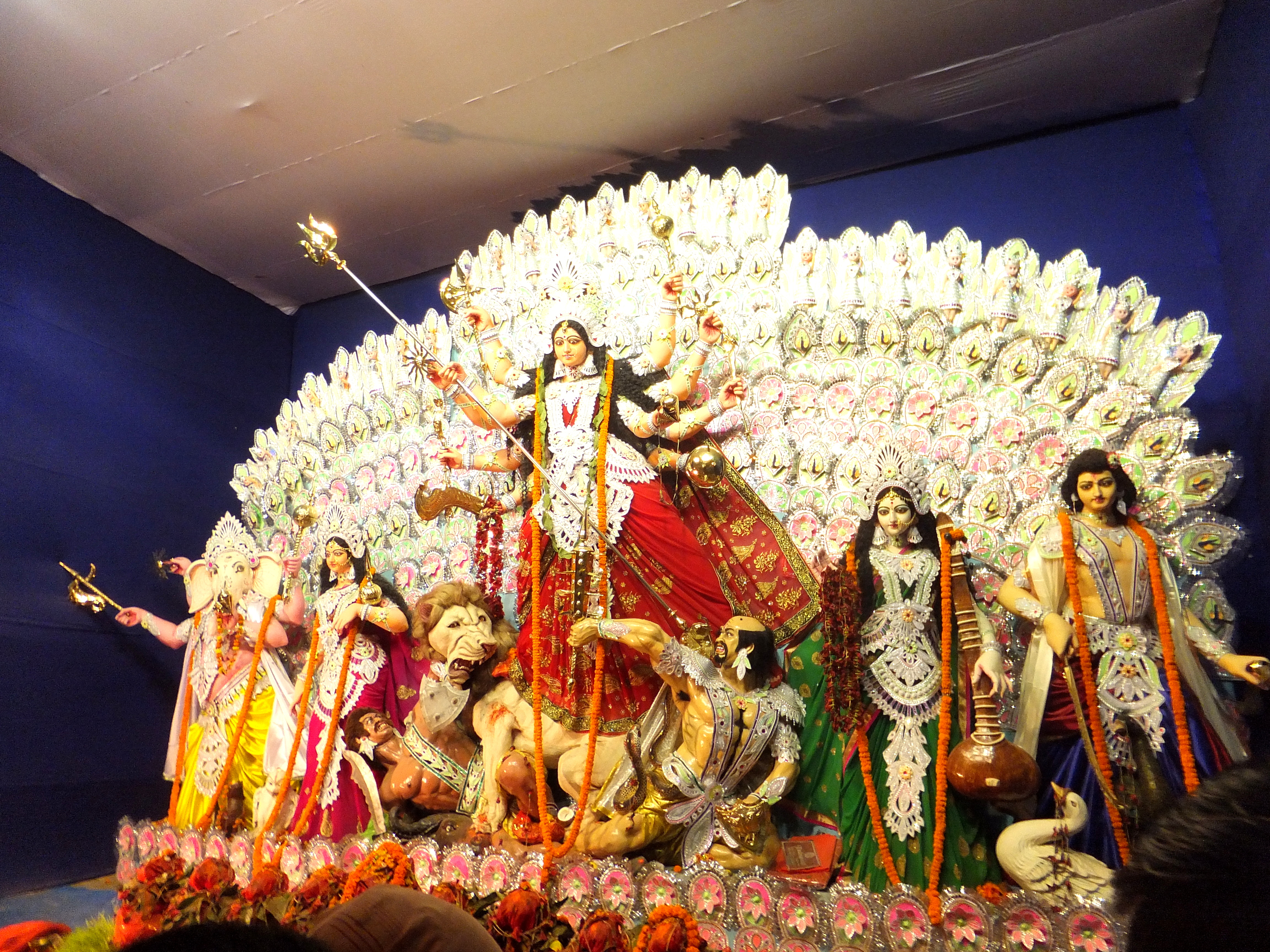
A murti, or representation, of the goddess Durga shown during the Durga Puja festival

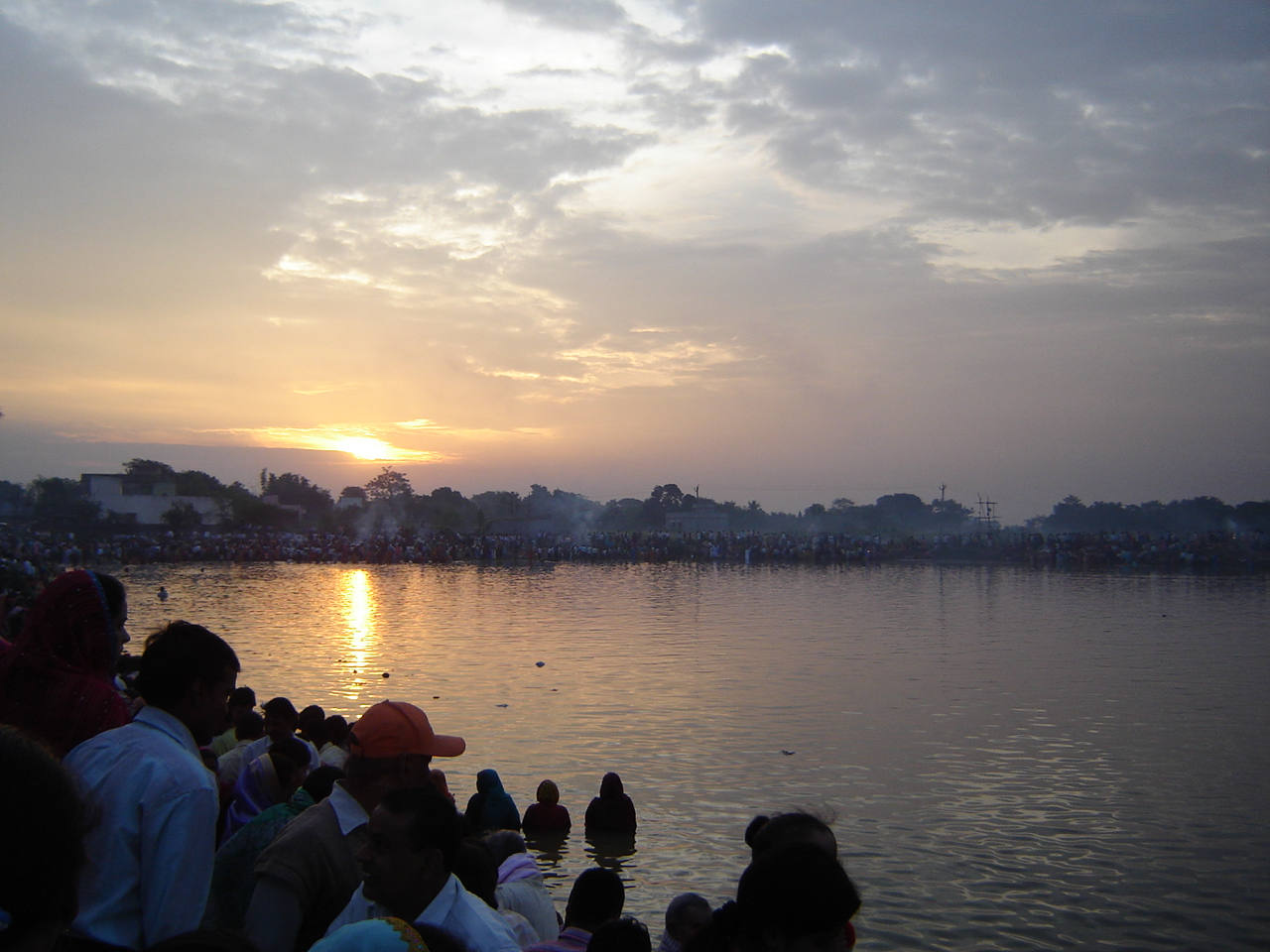
People Celebrating Chhath Festival the 2nd Day at Morning a tribute to the rising holy God Sun

== Tourism ==
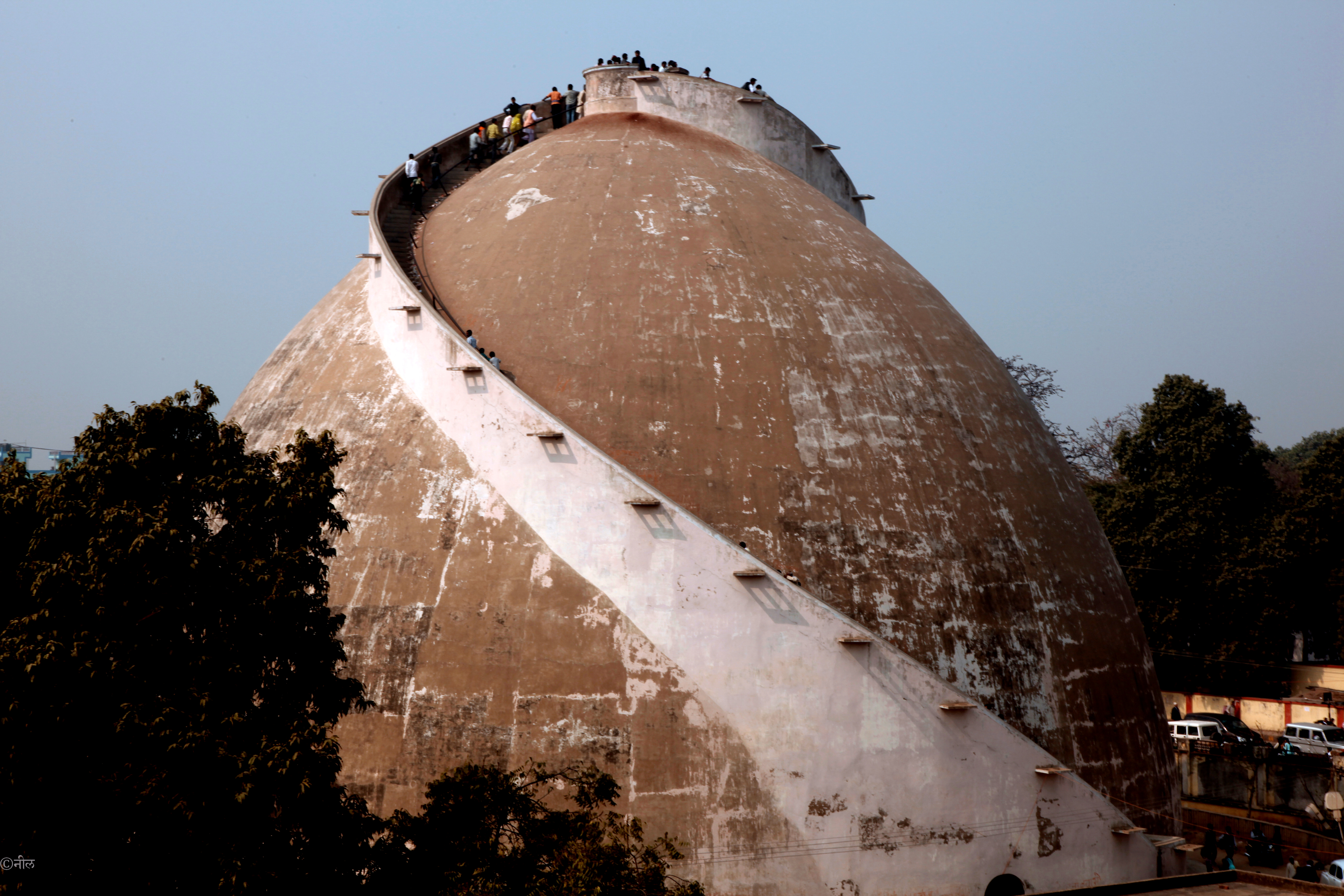
Golghar was originally built to serve as a granary for the British East India Company army during the famine of 1786. It now features an observation deck overlooking the Ganges and the city.

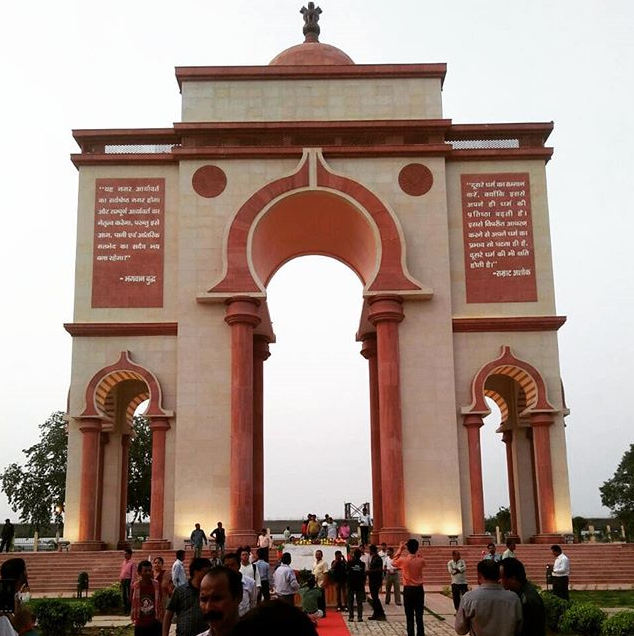
Sabhyata Dwar in Patna

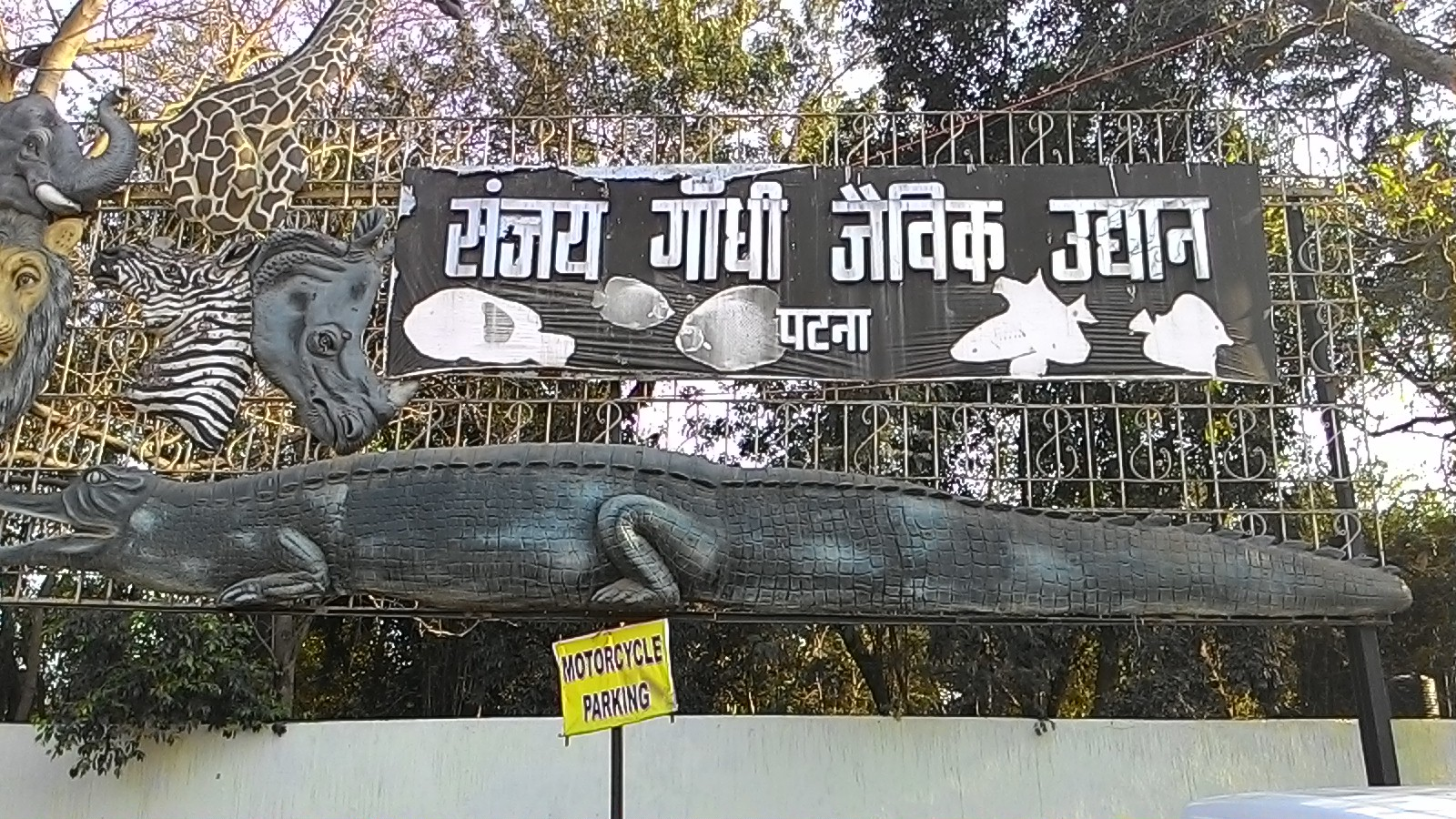
Sanjay Gandhi Zoological Park in Patna

Patna is home to many tourist attractions and it saw about 2.4 million tourists (including day visitors) in 2005. Tourists visiting the city accounted for 41% of the total number of tourists visiting Bihar although Bodh Gaya was the most popular destination for foreign visitors. The cultural heritage of Bihar is reflected in its many ancient monuments. Kumhrar and Agam Kuan are the sites of the ruins of the Ashokan Pataliputra. Didarganj Yakshi remains as an example of Mauryan art.

Takht Sri Patna Sahib is one of the Five Takhts of Sikhism and consecrates the birthplace of the tenth Guru of the Sikhs, Gobind Singh. There are five other Gurdwaras in Patna that are related to different Sikh Gurus; these are Gurdwara Pahila Bara, Gurdwara Gobind Ghat, Gurdwara Guru ka Bagh, Gurdwara Bal Leela, Gurdwara Handi Sahib, and Prakash Punj. Padri Ki Haveli, High Court, Golghar, Sultan Palace, and Secretariat Building are examples of British architecture. Gandhi Maidan is a historic ground in Patna where several freedom movement rallies took place. Newly built Buddha Smriti Park near Patna Junction is also becoming a major tourist attraction.

The Patna Planetarium (Indira Gandhi Planetarium) is in Patna's Indira Gandhi Science Complex. It claims to be one of the largest planetariums in Asia and to attract a large number of tourists. The Sanjay Gandhi Jaivik Udyan (Patna Zoo) is at Bailey Road, Raj Bhawan, Rajbanshi Nagar, and includes over 300 mammals, 300 birds, and 450 species of reptiles as of January 2019.

In 2015, the Bihar government has built a state-of-the-art art landmark museum in Patna at a cost of approximately ₹530 crores on a site of 13.9 acres at Bailey Road. 5 firms were shortlisted for the architectural design, of which the Japanese firm Maki and Associates was chosen. It is now completed and opened for all. Completed in May 2018, the Sabhyata Dwar was built with Mauryan-style architecture. It was opened to the general public in December 2018.

In 2014, the Bihar government laid the foundation of Samrat Ashok International Convention Centre. It is expected to use more steel than used in raising Eiffel Tower and Indira Gandhi International Airport. Construction of Dr. A.P.J Abdul Kalam Science City began in February 2019. The Eco Park is in Jawaharlal Nehru Marg. It has more than 3,000 varieties of plants and includes several theme parks, a restaurant, and a boat trip zone.

== Education ==
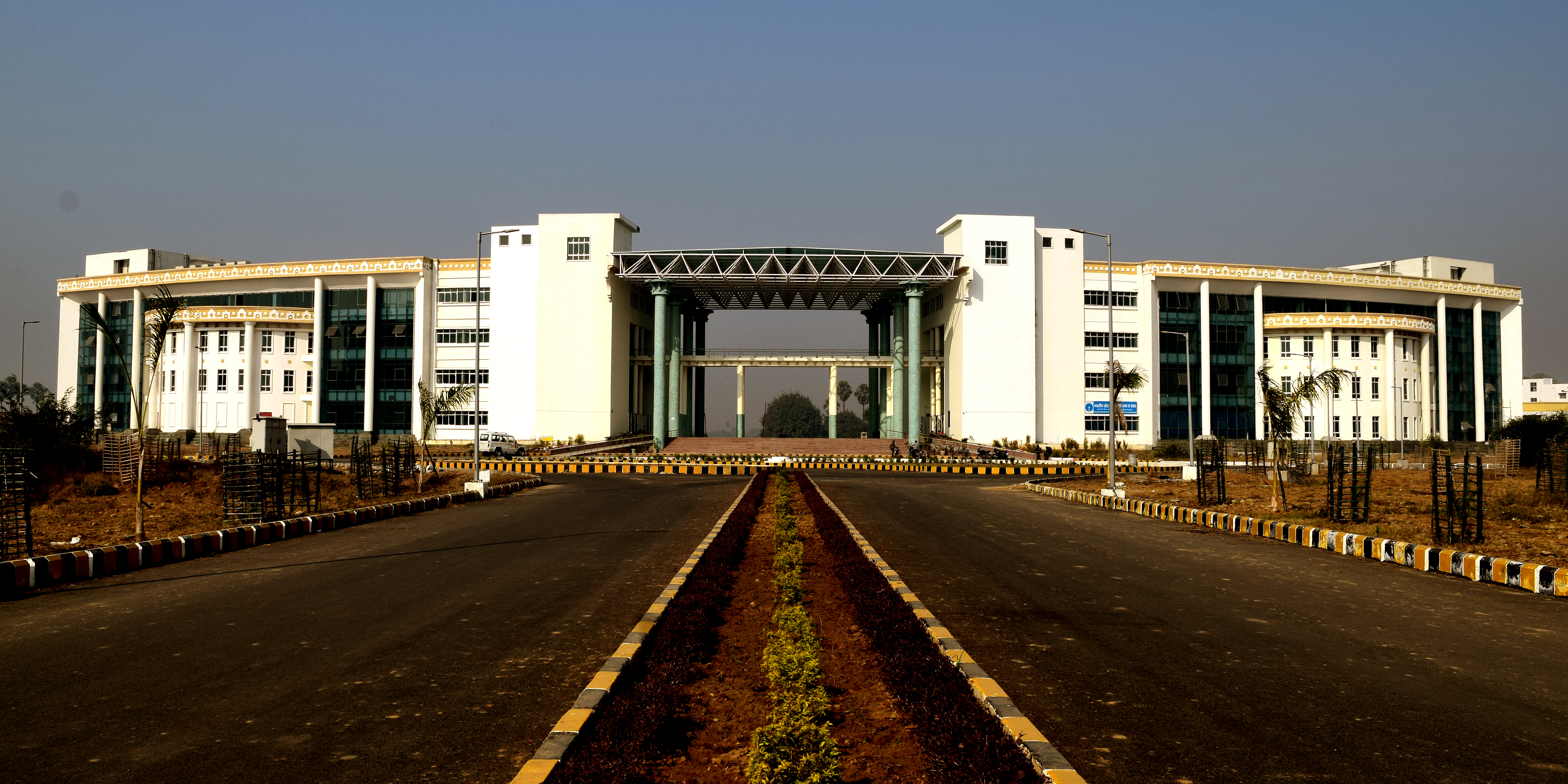
Indian Institute of Technology Patna at Bihta, one of the premier institutes of engineering and research in India.

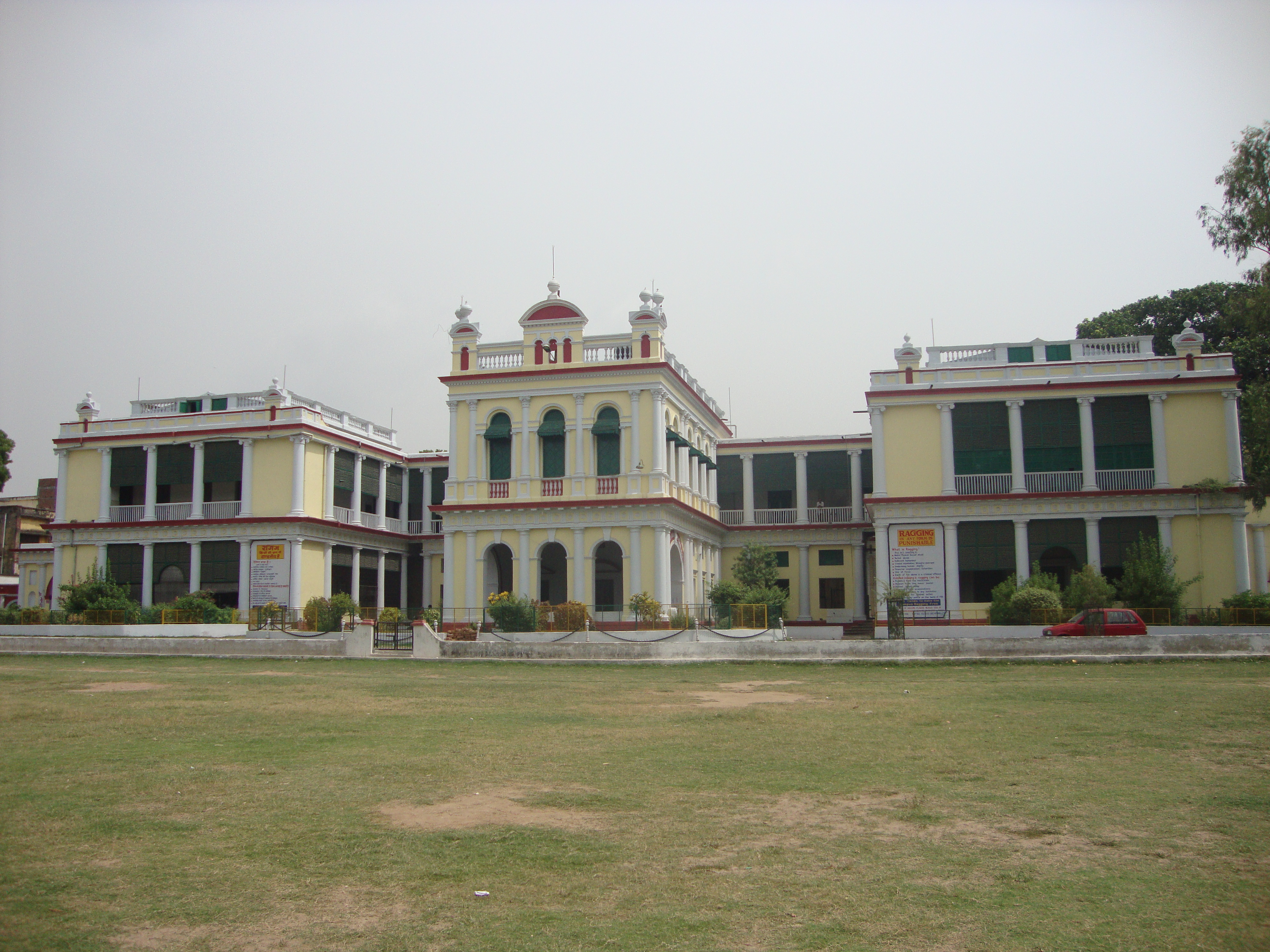
Patna College, established 1863, is considered to be the oldest institution of higher education in Bihar.

Schools in Patna are either government-run schools or private schools. The schools are affiliated to Bihar School Examination Board (BSEB), Council for the Indian School Certificate Examinations (CISCE), National Institute of Open Schooling (NIOS), or the Central Board of Secondary Education (CBSE) boards. A number of Bengali medium schools also thrive in Patna. Hindi and English are the primary languages of instruction. A 2012 survey found 1,574 schools: of these, 78% were private unaided schools (most of them at an affordable cost), 21% were government schools and 1% were private aided.

Under the 10+2+3/4 plan, students complete ten years of schooling and then enroll in schools that have a higher secondary facility and are affiliated to the Bihar State Intermediate Board, the All-India Council for the Indian School Certificate Examinations (CISCE), the NIOS or the CBSE, where they select one of three streams: arts, commerce, or science. This is followed by either a general degree course in a chosen field of study or a professional degree course, such as law, engineering, and medicine.

Patna has important government educational institutions like Patna University, Anugrah Narayan College, Chanakya National Law University, Aryabhatta Knowledge University, Indian Institute of Technology Patna, Bakhtiyarpur College of Engineering, National Institute of Technology, Patna, Patna Science College, Patna Women's College, Patna Law College, Bihar Veterinary College, J.D. Women's College, Birla Institute of Technology, Patna, Patna Medical College Hospital, Rajendra Memorial Research Institute of Medical Sciences, Nalanda Medical College Hospital, Indira Gandhi Institute of Medical Sciences, Mahavir Cancer Sansthan, All India Institute of Medical Sciences Patna, National Institute of Fashion Technology Patna, Chandragupta Institute of Management, Development Management Institute, National Institute of Electronics & Information Technology, Patliputra University.

Patna University was established in 1917 and is the seventh oldest modern university in the Indian Sub-continent. Patna also has a variety of other universities, as well as many primary and secondary schools.

Nalanda University (also known as Nalanda International University) is an established university in Rajgir, around 100 kilometres (62 mi) from Patna. The University, created as a revival of an ancient centre of learning at Nalanda, began its first academic session on 1 September 2014. It attracts students from across the globe.

== Sports ==
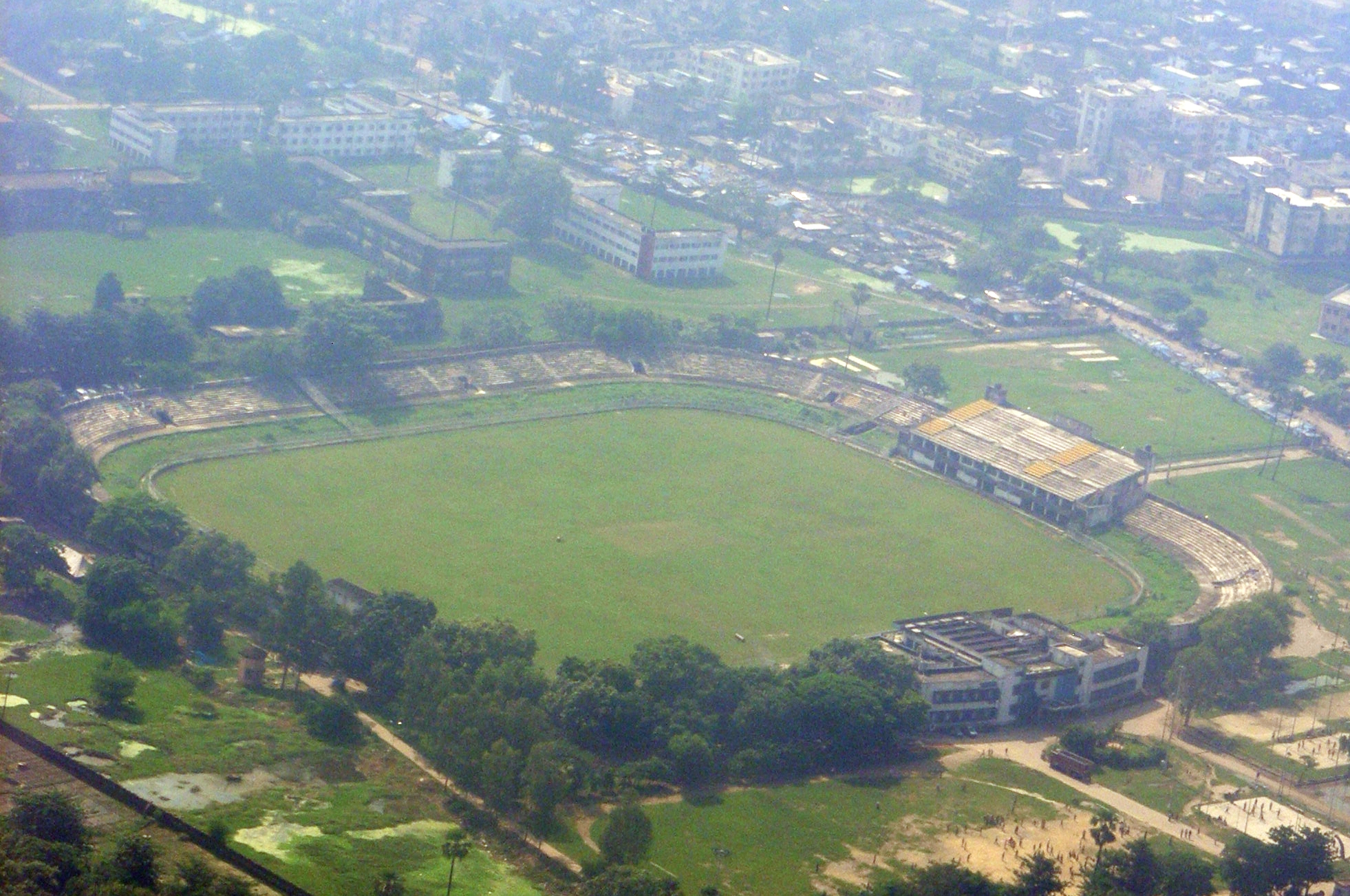
Moin-Ul-Haque Stadium near Rajendra Nagar, used for cricket and association football.

As in the rest of India, cricket is popular in Patna and is played on grounds and in streets throughout the city. There are several sports grounds across the city. The Bihar Cricket Association, which regulates cricket in Bihar, is based in the city. Tournaments, especially those involving cricket, basketball, football, badminton, and table tennis, are regularly organised on an inter-locality or inter-club basis.

Moin-ul-Haq Stadium, which has a capacity of 25,000, has served as the venue for two one-day international cricket matches and several national sports events. It was home to the Bihar cricket team. Due to negligence and lack of maintenance, the stadium is in a dilapidated state and no international match has been played here since 1996. In 2013, it was announced by the Chief Minister of Bihar Nitish Kumar that an international cricket stadium will be constructed at Rajgir.

The Patna Golf Club was established on 21 March 1916, and is one of the oldest golf courses in India. It has 18 holes in a historic setting in and around Bailey Road, a 165-acre (67 ha) course.

Patna hosted the first ever woman's Kabaddi world cup. It was held at the Patliputra Sports Complex, Kankarbagh from 1 to 4 March 2012. Hosts India won the World Cup defeating Iran in the finals. Patna also hosts the seven league matches of Pro Kabaddi League with its home team as Patna Pirates at the Patliputra Sports Complex.

Other famous sports complexes of Patna are Bihar Military Police's Mithilesh Stadium, East Central Railway zone's indoor stadium at Digha etc.

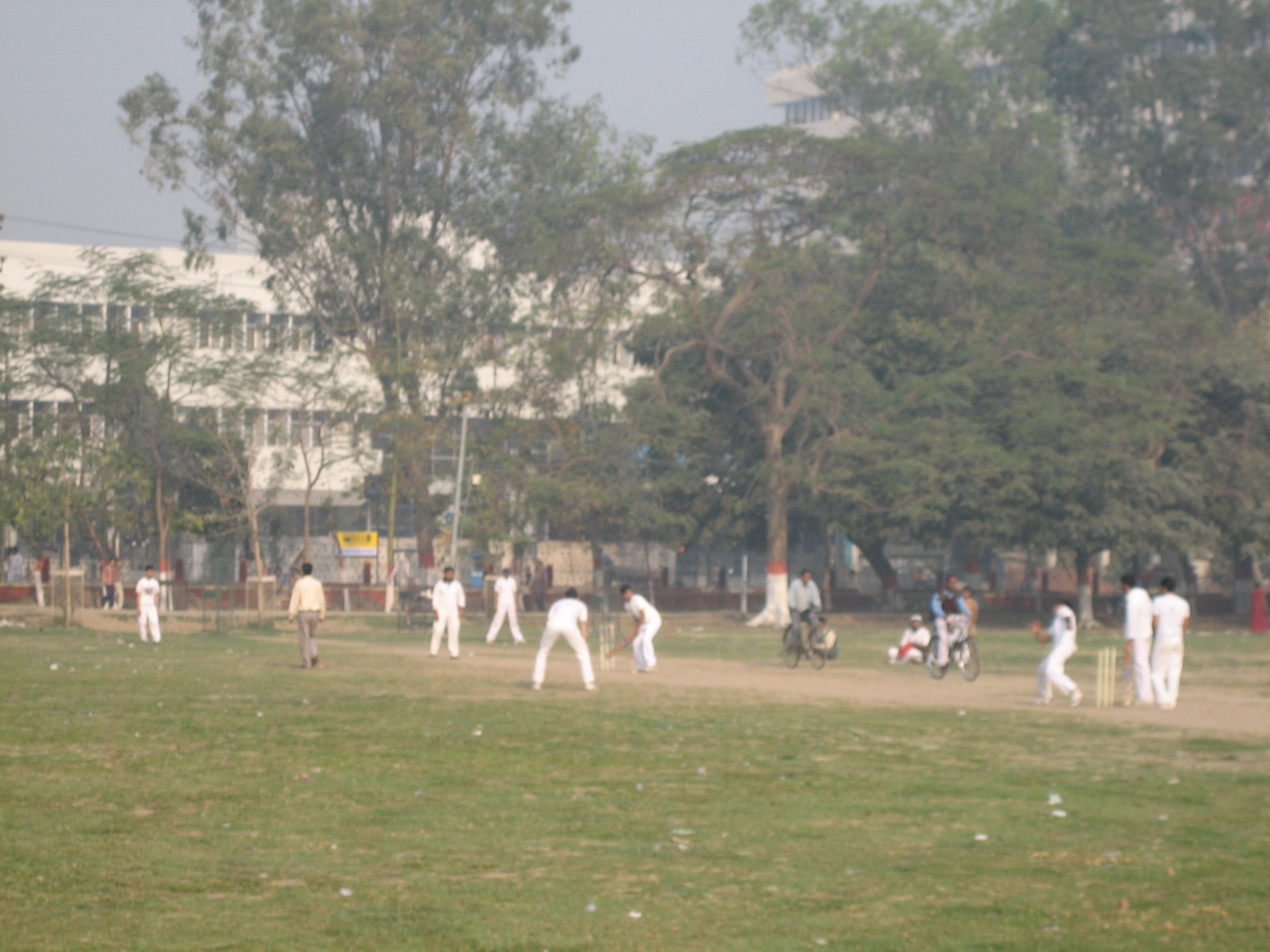
A game of cricket in progress

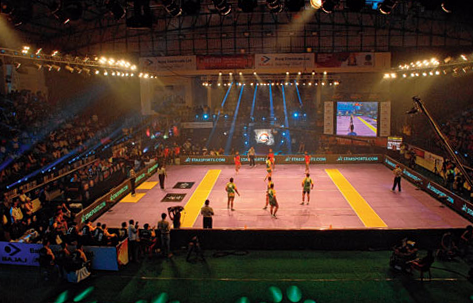
Kankarbagh Indoor Stadium at Patliputra Sports Complex during Pro Kabaddi League match

== Media ==
The beginning of the 20th century was marked by a number of notable new publications. A monthly magazine named Bharat Ratna was started in Patna in 1901. It was followed by Ksahtriya Hitaishi, Aryavarta from Dinapure, Patna, Udyoga and Chaitanya Chandrika. Udyog was edited by Vijyaanand Tripathy, a famous poet of the time and Chaitanya Chandrika by Krishna Chaitanya Goswami, a literary figure of that time. The literary activity was not confined to Patna alone but to many districts of Bihar.

Magahi Parishad, established in Patna in 1952, pioneered Magadhi journalism in Bihar. It started the monthly journal, Magadhi, which was later renamed Bihan.

Many national media agencies, including the Press Trust of India and Doordarshan's regional offices, are based in the city. The Hindu, The Times of India, Hindustan Times, The Economic Times and The Telegraph are the five principal English-language daily newspapers which have Patna editions. The Pioneer and The Indian Express, though not printed in the city, are other English-language daily newspapers available in the city. The city's Hindi newspapers include Hindustan Dainik, Dainik Jagran, Dainik Bhaskar, Prabhat Khabar, Aaj and Rashtriya Sahara, all of which have editions from Patna. There are also daily Urdu newspapers like Qaumi Tanzeem, Farooqi Tanzeem, and Qaumi Duniya Daily published in Patna. There is also the Hindi and English mixed newspaper tabloid Inext.

Patna has several AM and FM radio stations, including many state-owned channels. The city hosts several radio stations, including the state-owned All India Radio's Vividh Bharati, and FM 105. The All India Radio, Patna (officially Akashvani Patna Kendra) was established in 1948.

Patna is served by several private channels.

=== Private FM stations ===
No.	Name	Frequency	Language
01	Radio Mirchi	98.3 FM	Hindi
02	Radio City	91.1 FM	Hindi
03	Big FM	95.0 FM	Hindi & Bhojpuri
04	Red FM	93.5 FM	Hindi

== See also ==
- List of cities in Bihar by population
- Patna Lok Sabha constituency
- Largest Indian Cities by GDP
