= Prakash Punj =

- Location within India Location within Bihar
- Location: Patna
- Coordinates: 25.6087°N 85.1738°E
- Area: 10 acres (4.0 ha)

Prakash Punj or Bahu Uddeshiya Prakash Kendra and Udyan (Multi Purpose light centre and Garden) is under construction park at Guru Ka Bag near Bazzar samiti in Patna Sahib area.

== Overview ==
The Prakash Punj is being built at a cost of 54.16 crore to keep the memory of 350th Prakash Parv of Guru Gobind Singh over the land of 10 Acres. The entire structure will be open from all sides and aim to complete it before Prakash Parv in 2020.

== Attraction ==
It will have theme park, two exhibition halls, Auditorium and four commemorative gates in the name of four sons of the Guru Govind Singh. Will known as Baba Ajeet Singh Dwar, Baba Fateh Singh Dwar, Baba Jujhar singh Dwar and Baba Jorawar Singh Dwar and five Takhts Paunta Sahib, Nandad Sahib, keshgarh Sahib, Hemkund Sahib and Patna Sahib. The theme park would be one its kind narrating Guru Govind Singh's life and information about Sikh religion through various models and plaques, Special fountains and landscaping would be add to the attraction. The exhibition halls would exhibit paintings and similar things related to the Sikh religion in general and Guru Gobind Singh in particular. The auditorium would be used to organise various programmes in connection with religious functions and other relative activities

== See also ==
- Takht Sri Patna Sahib
- Guru Ka Bag
- Gurdwara Bal Lila Maini Sangat
- Gurdwara Handi Sahib
