= Religion in Bihar =

Overview of religion in the Indian state of Bihar

Religion in Bihar, as per 2023 Bihar caste-based census
1. Hinduism (82.0%)
2. Islam (17.7%)
3. Buddhism (0.09%)
4. Jainism (0.01%)
5. Christianity (0.05%)
6. Sikhism (0.01%)
7. Other (0.13%)
8. 0.00%

Hinduism is the most followed religion in Bihar, followed by nearly 82% of total population as per 2023 Bihar Caste based census. Islam is the second-most followed religion which is followed by nearly 17.7% of population. There is also a significant population of Buddhists and Christians in the state.

== History of religion in Bihar ==
The Hindu Goddess Sita, the consort of Lord Rama, is believed to have been born in Sitamarhi district in the Mithila region of modern-day Bihar. It was the Ancient Bihar that give birth to new Indic religions: Buddhism and Jainism. Gautama Buddha attained Enlightenment at Bodh Gaya, a town located in the modern day district of Gaya in Bihar. Vasupujya, the 12th Jain Tirthankara was born in Champapuri, Bhagalpur. Vardhamana Mahavira, the 24th and last Tirthankara of Jainism, was born in Vaishali around the sixth century BC. Bodh Gaya in Bihar is an important pilgrimage centre for the global Buddhists. The tenth Guru of the Sikhs, Guru Gobind Singh, was born here in 1666 and spent his early years here before moving to Anandpur. The Gurdwara at Patna Sahib marks the birthplace of Guru Gobind Singh.

== Religious demographics ==
The main religions in the Indian state of Bihar are Hinduism (practiced by 82.7% of the population) and Islam (16.9%) as of 2011.

As Per Recently Released Bihar caste-based survey 2022, Hinduism is Practised by 81.99% and Islam is Followed by 17.70%.

=== Statistics ===
Religion wise historical population of Bihar (incl. Jharkhand prior to 2001 census)
Religion Census	Total population	Hinduism	Islam	Christianity	Buddhism	Sikhism	Jainism	Other religions	Not Stated
1951	38,786,184	33,075,664	4,373,360	415,548	1,092	37,947	8,165	874,408	
1961	46,455,610	39,347,050	5,785,631	502,195	2,885	44,413	17,598	755,838	
1971	56,353,369	47,031,801	7,594,173	658,717	4,806	61,520	25,185	976,997	170
1981	69,914,734	58,011,070	9,874,993	740,186	3,003	77,704	27,613	1,179,878	287
1991	86,374,465	71,193,417	12,787,985	843,717	3,518	78,212	23,049	1,443,258	1,309
2001	82,998,509	69,076,919	13,722,048	53,137	18,818	20,780	16,085	52,905	37,817
2011	104,099,452	86,078,686	17,557,809	129,247	25,453	23,779	18,914	13,437	252,127
2022 survey	130,725,310	107,181,681	23,138,379	75,238	111,247	14,753	12,523	189,343	2,146

Religion growth rate (in %)
Religion	2001	2011	2023
Hinduism	83.2	82.7	82.0
Islam	16.5	16.9	17.7
Buddhism	0.02	0.02	0.09
Christianity	0.06	0.12	0.05
Sikhism	0.03	0.02	0.01
Jainism	0.02	0.02	0.01
Other	0.06	0.01	0.13
Non-religious		0.2	~

== Hinduism ==
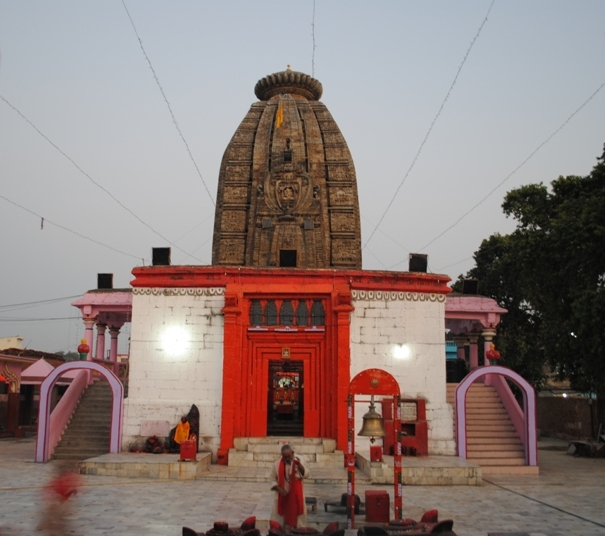
Deo Sun Temple, Deo

Hinduism is the main religion of the state, being practiced by 82.7% of the total state population. The Hindu population in Bihar is 86,078,686 as of 2022 census report. Hindus are majority in all the districts in Bihar except Kishanganj. Most of the festivals stem from it. There are many variations on the festival theme. While some are celebrated all over the state, others are observed only in certain areas. But Bihar being so diverse, different regions and religions have something to celebrate at sometime or the other during the year. So festivals take place round the year.

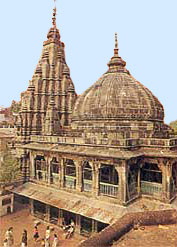
Vishnupad Mandir, Gaya, Bihar

On arrival in any part of this state, tourists find around them evidence of the extent to which religion enters into the daily life of the people. The calendar is strewn with festivals and fairs of different communities living together. Many of these are officially recognised by the days on which they take place being proclaimed as Government holidays.

The battle cries of the Bihar Regiment, consisting of 17 battalions, are "Jai Bajrang Bali" (Victory to Lord Hanuman).

=== Hindu pilgrimage ===
Hindu pilgrimage sites in Bihar are as follows:

- Mahavir Mandir
- Sitamarhi
- Deo, Bihar
- Mundeshwari Temple
- Budhanath Temple
- Madhubani
- West Champaran
- Buxar
- Sultanganj
- Mithila region

== Islam ==
Islam constitutes second largest religion in Bihar. According to 2011 Indian census, there were 17,557,809 Muslims in the state.

== Buddhism ==
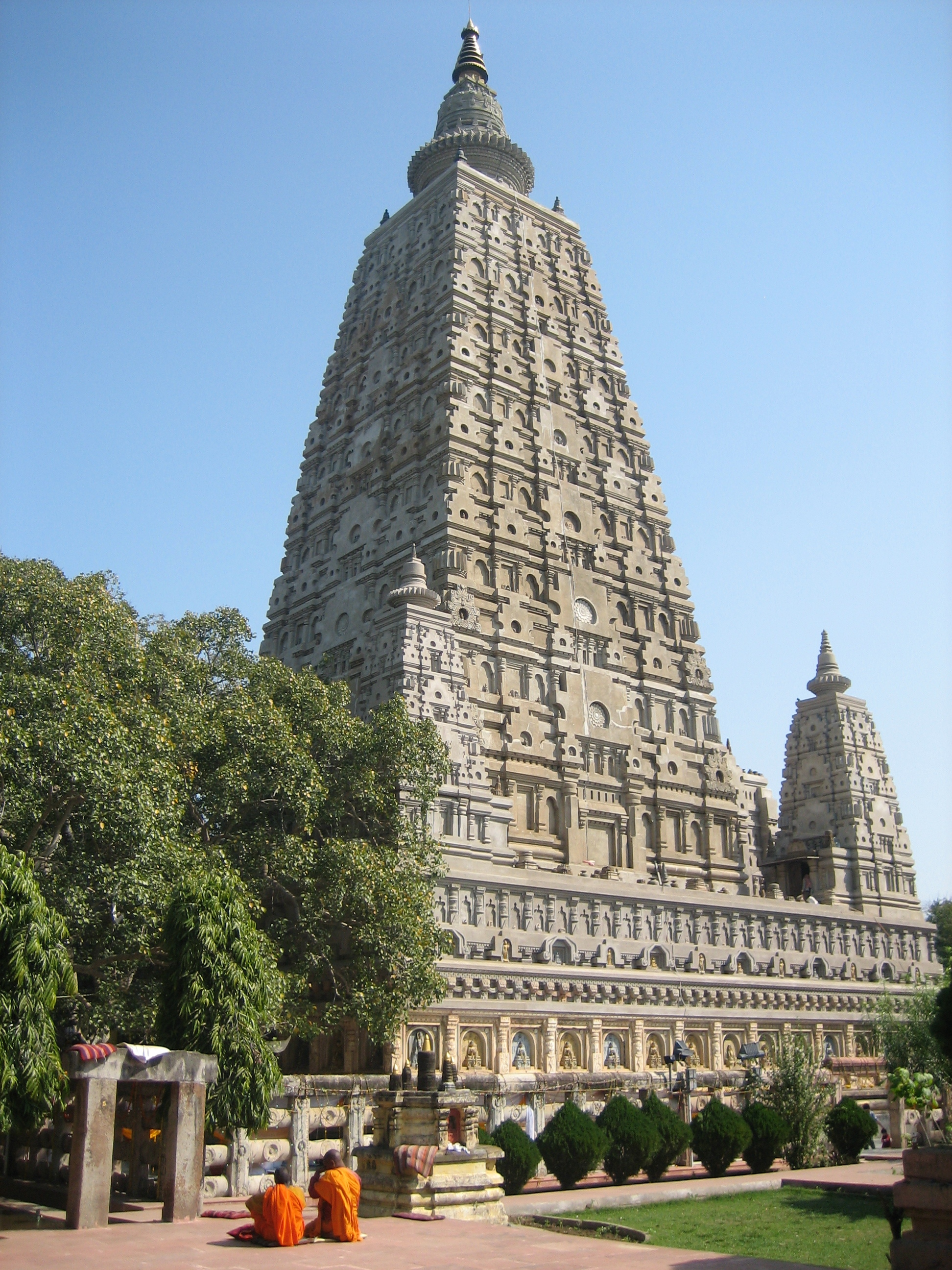
Mahabodhi Temple

Buddhism constitutes 3rd largest religion in Bihar. As per recently released Bihar caste-based survey 2022, there were 111,247 (or 0.085%) Buddhists in the state.

The name Bihar derives from the Sanskrit word vihāra, an important institution of Buddhism meaning "abode". The land of Bihar is considered important in Buddhism as Siddhartha Gautama was said to have attained enlightenment in Bodh Gaya under the Bodhi Tree, making Bodh Gaya the holiest site in Buddhism and a key place of pilgrimage associated with the Mahabodhi Temple Complex in Bihar's Gaya district. Gautama Buddha preached many sermons in different places in Bihar, including Vaishali and Rajgir. Even after his Mahaprinirvana, disciples carried on the doctrine of Buddhism in the regions of Magadha, Bihar. Gautama Buddha's disciples opened several monasteries and universities such as Nalanda University and Vikramshila University. Magadha emperor Ashoka the Great became a Buddhist and made Buddhism the state religion, spreading its doctrine to different parts of India and abroad.

=== Buddhist Pilgrimage ===
Buddhist pilgrimages in Bihar are as follows:

- Mahabodhi Temple
- Bodhi Tree
- Bodh Gaya
- Gaya
- Vaishali
- Pawapuri
- Nalanda
- Rajgir
- Kesariya
- Vikramashila
- Areraj
- Pataliputra

== Jainism ==
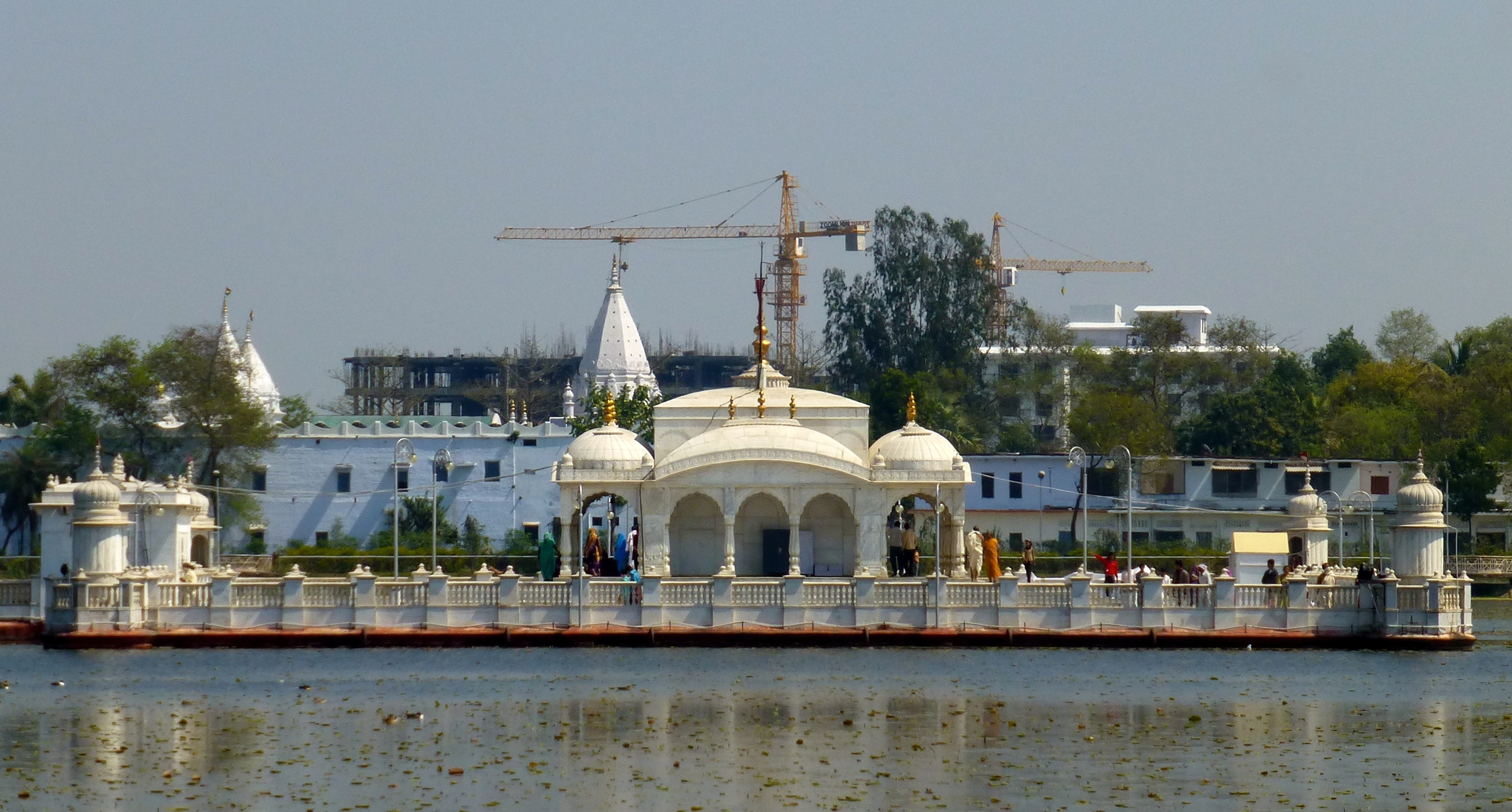
The famous Jain temple located at Pawapuri, Bihar

Vardhamana Mahavira, the 24th and the last Tirthankara of Jainism, was born in Vaishali around sixth century B.C. Rajgir is birthplace of Munisuvrata, the twentieth Jain tirthankara and Pawapuri is nirvana place of Mahavira the last Jain tirthankara. Pataliputra and Vaishali is significant religious place in Jainism. Champapuri is a Jain pilgrimages where all the five kalyanaks of lord Vasupujya have taken place. The tallest statue of Jain tirthankara Vasupujya which stands 31 Feet in height was built in Champapuri in 2014. The Panch Kalyanak Pratishtha Mahotsav of the statue was done from 27 Feb to 3 Mar 2014.

=== Jain Pilgrimage ===
Jain pilgrimages in Bihar are as follows:

- Rajgir
- Pawapuri
- Lachhuar Jain temple
- Pataliputra
- Jamui
- Arrah
- Vikramashila
- Champapuri
- Kundalpur, Bihar
- Nalanda
- Gunawa
- Mandar Hill
- Vaishali

== Christianity ==
Padari ki haveli is a Roman Catholic church of centuries. Holy Saviour Church of Arrah is also historically important site

== Sikhism ==
The capital of Bihar, Patna, is one of the holiest cities in Sikhism. The tenth Guru of the Sikhs, Guru Gobind Singh, was born here in 1666 and spent his early years here before moving to Anandpur. The Gurdwara at Patna Sahib marks the birthplace of Guru Gobind Singh. Patna was visited by Guru Nanak in 1509 as well as Guru Tegh Bahadur in 1666. Takht Shri Harmandir Saheb (also known as Patna Saheb) is one of the Five Takhts of Sikhism. Guru Nanak Dev visited Patna and stayed in GaiGhat in 1509, and later same place was visited by Guru Tegh Bahadur along with his family in 1666. Gurdwara Pahila Bara (commonly known as Gurdwara Ghai Ghat) is dedicated to these two Guru and is situated at the same holy place.

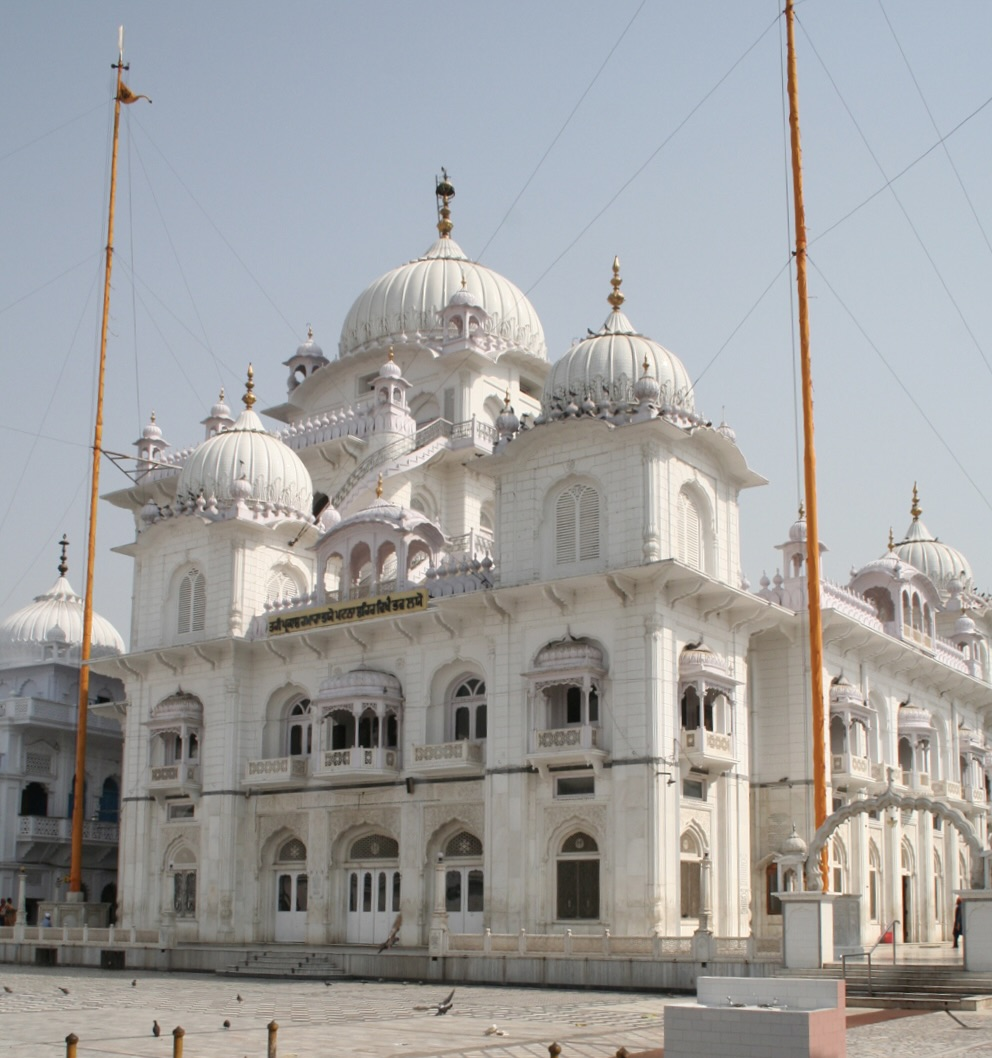
Takht Sri Harmandir Sahib, Patna

Other shrines are Gurdwara Gobind Ghat and Gurdwara Guru ka Bagh. Gurdwara Bal Leela is directly related to the childhood of Guru Gobind Singh. Gurdwara Handi Sahib was built in the memory of Guru Teg Bahadur, who stayed here in 1666 with Mata Gujri and Bala Preetam.

After the partition of India in 1947, many Sikhs came to Patna. The total population of Sikhs in Bihar is only 20,780. Most of Bihari Sikhs are Nanakpanthi. Most of the Sikhs are residing in Patna and mainly they are self-employed or in business.

=== Sikh Pilgrimage ===
Sikh pilgrimages in Bihar are as follows:

- Takht Shri Harmandir Saheb
- Guru ka Bagh
- Ghai Ghat
- Handi Sahib
- Gobind Ghat
- Bal Lila Maini
- Guru Bagh

.

== Baháʼí Faith ==
In 2012, plans were announced for the construction of a local Baháʼí Faith House of Worship in Bihar Sharif. This would be the second Baháʼí House of Worship in India (the first being the well-known Lotus Temple in Delhi), and one of the first two local Baháʼí Houses of Worship in Asia (the other being in Battambang, Cambodia).

In 2013, the Baháʼí World Centre released an hour-and-a-half-long video in five languages entitled Frontiers of Learning, showing Baháʼí community-building activities in four cities from different continents, the fourth of which is Bihar Sharif.

== Other religions ==
Sarnaism has a presence among the tribal populations.

== See also ==
- Religion in India
