= 350th Prakash Parv =

350th birth anniversary celebration of Guru Gobind Singh

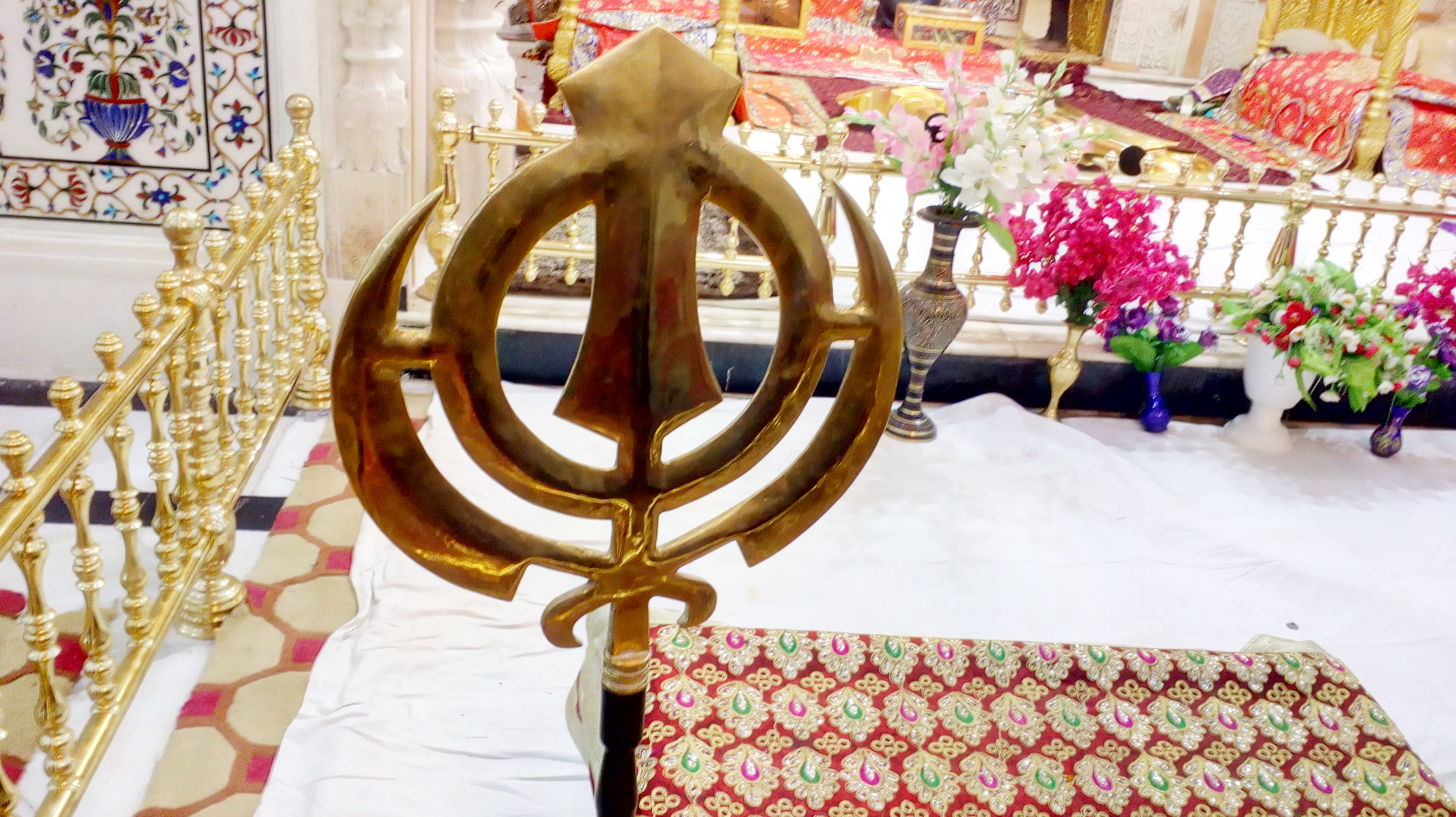
- Khanda, Patna Sahib
- Begins: 30 December 2016
- Ends: 5 January 2017
- Venue: Takht Sri Patna Sahib, Patna City
- Locations: Patna, Bihar
- Country: India
- Organiser: Tourism Department, Government of Bihar
- Website: prakashparv.com

The 350th Prakash Parv (also Prakash Utsav) or birth anniversary of Guru Gobind Singh ji was celebrated in January 2017 in Patna, India. 2017 is the year of the 350th anniversary of the 10th Sikh Guru, a spiritual master, warrior, poet and philosopher. At the date of this anniversary, a number of events was organized on the occasion in Patna marking a grand celebration in their history.

== Development and preparation ==
Just as the construction of the over-bridge, which connects Guru Gobind Path with the National Highway is undergoing for the 350th anniversary of Guru Gobind Singh, several major construction projects have been undertaken for the 350th anniversary celebrations.

- The roads and bylanes which connects to Gurdwara Kangan Ghat in the Patna City area, situated on the bank of river Ganges is hardly 200 yards from Takht Sri Patna Sahib, are undergoing a major facelift
- A temporary tent city spanning over 75 acres is to be set up on the banks of Ganga near Kangan Ghat
- The Indian Railways is re-opening Patna Ghat railway station between Patna Sahib and Gulzarbagh to clear the rush. It has also constructed a new road overbridge near Chowk Shikarpur on main line.
- Several tourist information centres would be opened in Patna
- 200 CCTV cameras will be installed to monitor the situation
- The Gurudwara Prabandhak Committee (gurdwara management committee) is also undertaking huge constructions and renovations on its campus.
- Multiple tent cities have been planned across Patna under the aegis of Department of Tourism, Government of Bihar, with the main celebrations being conducted at Gandhi Maidan.
- On 16 September 2016, Nitish Kumar, chief minister of Bihar, declared a three-day public holiday in Patna from 3 to 5 January 2017.

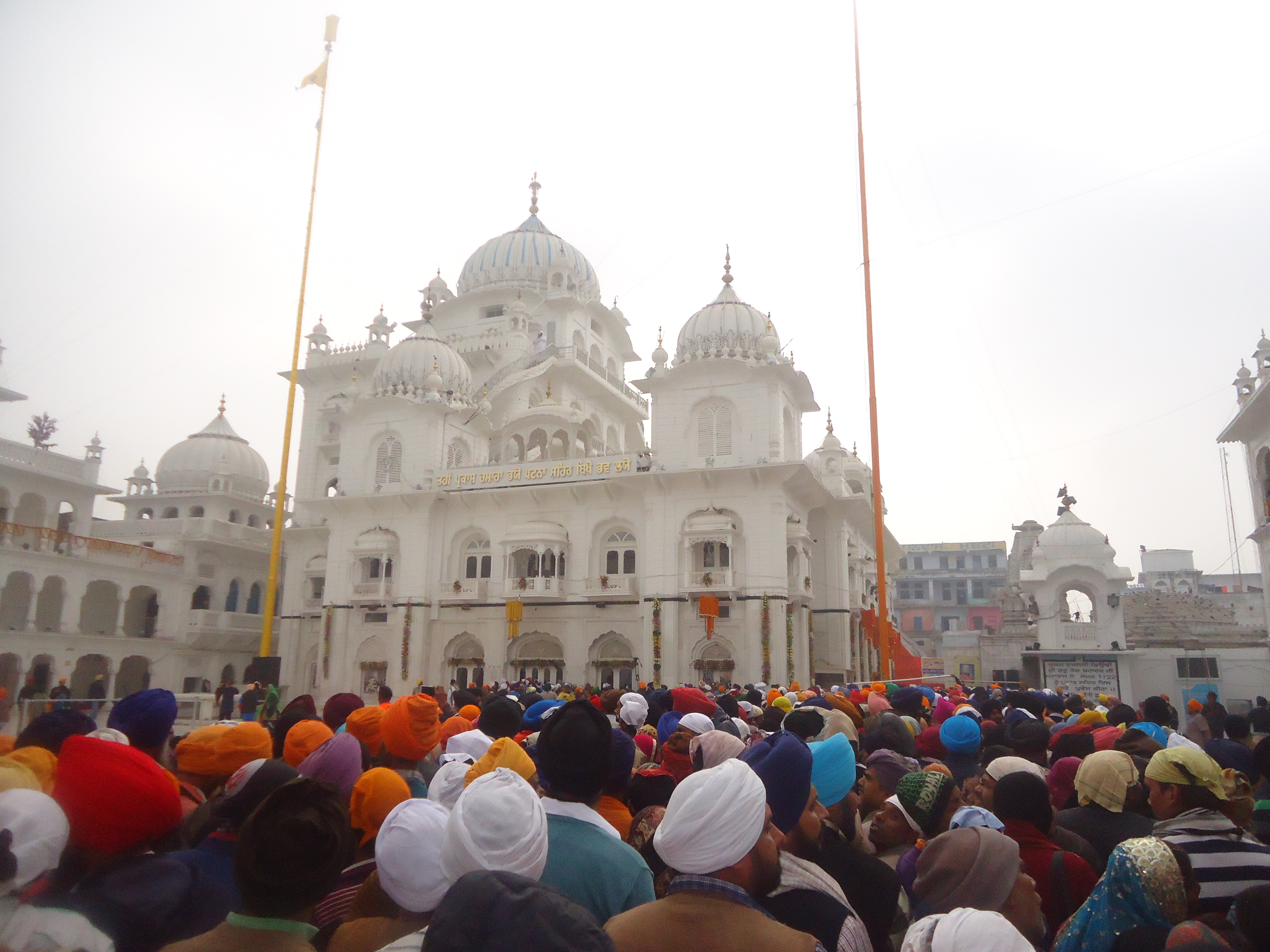
Takht Sri Patna Sahib during 350th Prakash Parv

=== Host city ===
Patna, the capital city of Bihar is the birthplace of Shri Guru Gobind Singh ji and host city for 350th anniversary celebrations. Most of the celebrations is scheduled to take place in the neighbourhood of Patna City, close to Takht Sri Patna Sahib Gurudwara. The famous Takht Sri Patna Sahib Gurudwara is an important shrine for Sikhs from all over the world. Patna Sahib is considered to be the second most important Takhat, according to religious importance. Patna City is the old area of Patna, located on the eastern side of the state capital. The Government of Bihar hosted the first ever International Sikh Conclave from 22 to 24 September 2016.

== Funding ==
Together, municipal, provincial and federal levels, that is, all three levels of federal government is contributing funds for the events and new infrastructure planned for the celebrations. In September 2014, officials of the Takht Shri Patna Saheb said NRIs and businessmen from across world will contribute ₹600 crore (US$62 million) to develop Harmandir Saheb. In February 2016, Union Finance Ministry allocated a package of ₹100 crore (US$10 million) for the celebrations. The Bihar government on 16 September 2016 said, it will spend ₹100 crore (US$10 million) on the arrangements and the celebrations.

== Exhibition ==
Panjab Digital Library in collaboration with Bihar Government has organised an exhibition, "Emperor-Prophet Guru Gobind Singh Sahib" at Bihar Museum, Patna. The exhibition was inaugurated by Shri Shiv Chander Ram, Hon'ble Minister Department of Art, Culture & Youth on 30 December. It is open to public till 31 December 2017. After that it will be taken to different museums of Bihar. Focus of the exhibit is the digitized heritage of Panjab that elucidate various interesting facets of this glorious era. The heritage speaks for itself explaining history events and original circumstances as they unfolded.

The exhibit displays all the major events related to Guru Gobind Singh ji's eventful life from 1666 to 1708. Put in a systematic order, on display are copies of different historical paintings, miniatures, forts, rare pictures detailing the life of Guru Sahib and coins issued in his name during the Khalsa Raj, all accompanied by descriptions and text on panels detailing their significance. It not only brings to life the complete sequence of events as it happened but also how he revolutionized the society.

== See also ==
- Patna Sahib Mahotsav
- Sikhism
