= Gurdwara Bal Lila Maini Sangat =

- Location within Bihar

General information
- Architectural style: Gurdwara
- Location: Patna, Bihar
- Coordinates: 25°36′28.77″N 85°10′03.06″E
- Completed: unknown

Website
- http://www.gurdwaraballeela.com/

Gurdwara Bal Lila Maini Sangat in a narrow lane close to Takht Sri Harmandir Sahib marks the house where King Fateh Chand Maini lived. His childless Queen had developed special fondness for the young Guru Gobind Singh, who, too, often came here to sit in the Queen's lap giving her immense delight and spiritual solace. She fed the Child Gobind and his playmates, at his demand, with boiled and salted gram. Even now boiled and salted gram is served as prasad (consecrated food) in this Gurdwara, which, unlike the other shrines in Patna Sahib, is served by Nirmala Sikhs. A wood carving on the old front door is dated 28 August 1668, but the hall housing the sanctum and other blocks of rooms in the inner compound have been reconstructed during recent decades.

== See also ==
- Takht Sri Harmandir Sahib
- Akal Takht
- Takht Sri Keshgarh Sahib
- Takht Sri Damdama Sahib
- Takht Sri Hazur Sahib
