= Sumer Singh =

Sikh historian and writer

Sahibzada Baba Sumer Singh Bhalla
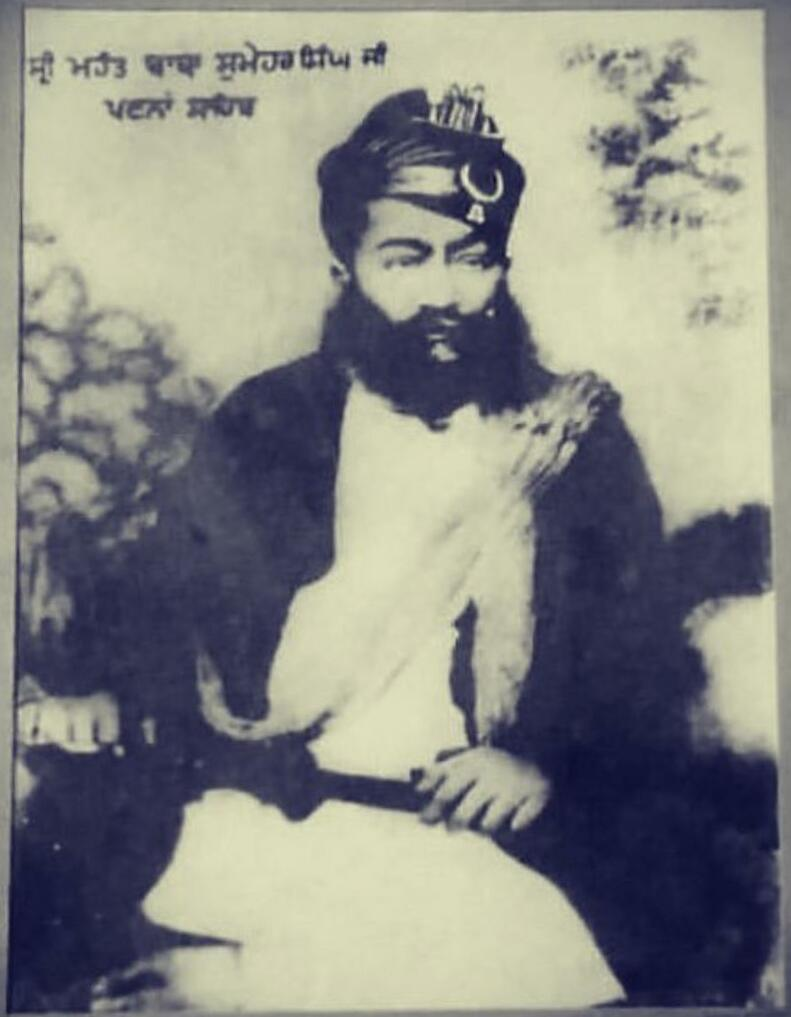
- Photograph of Baba Sumer Singh Bhalla
- Born: 1847
- Died: 1903 (aged 55–56)
- Occupation: Mahant of Takht Patna Sahib (1882–1903); Chairman of the Faridkot Teeka Committee

Sumer Singh (1847-1903) was a Sikh historian, a writer and poet of Braj literature, interpreter of Sikh Scripture, and teacher. Sumer Singh was called Sahibzada, prince, and Bābā, because of his direct lineage to the Bhalla clan, associated with Guru Amar Das.

== Titles ==
For some time he also was the Mahant (now termed Jathedar) of the Takht Sri Patna Sahib. He was Mahant of Takht Patna Sahib between the years 1882 to 1903. He also served as the chairman of the Faridkot Teeka Committee, overseeing the writing of the Faridkot Teeka.

== Works ==
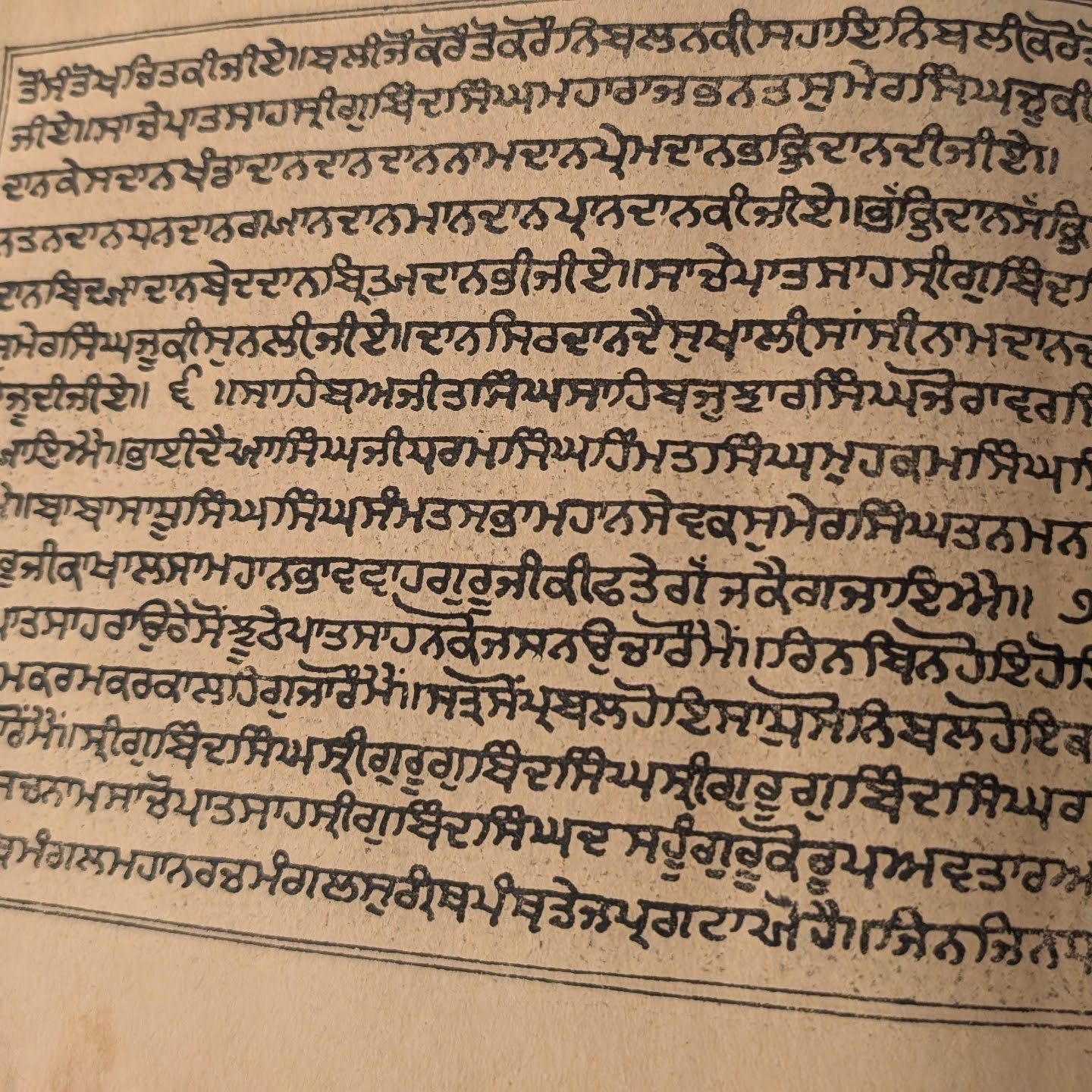
Detail of a page of a first-edition copy of 'Gurpad Prem Prakash', by Sumer Singh, printed in 1881

Mahan Kosh lists Sumer Singh's works as including: Khalsa Shattak, Gurpad Prem Prakash, Khalsa Panchasika, Gurkeerat Kavitavali, Gurcharit Darpan, Prem Prabhakar, Brahmand Puran, Makke Madine Di Gosht, Sumer Bhushan.

A master poet, Sumer Singh's Gurpad Prem Prakash (1881) is a narrative life story on Guru Gobind Singh and has been recently published in 2000 by the Punjabi University, Patiala, Publication Bureau, edited by Dr. Achhar Singh Kahlon.

Valerie Ritter (2010) writes that,

"Many of Sumersingh's publications were Sikh in subject matter, though other subjects and genres were also represented. One, for instance, consisted of kundaliyas based upon the more Krishnaite and riti-oriented Bihari Satasai. He wrote other pieces on poetic ornament (alamkara), couplets (dohas) on Sikh topics, and a commentary on the Japji Sahib. Shivanandan Sahay remembered him as a bhakta of Tulsi's Avadhi Ramcharitmanas as well, which he edited at the Press along with a commentary on the Manas by yet another Sikh author."

== Social Contributions ==
Ritter (2010) comments on the extrodinary life lived by Sumer Singh,

"the extensive network that Sumersingh moved in for religious, literary and, presumably, business purposes, deserves note. Mahant at Patna, litterateur in Varanasi, frequent visitor to the Punjab, and local intellectual in Nizamabad, Sumersingh moved fluidly between and within regions, and in varying social circles, ranging from the wealthy city merchant class of Varanasi, Brahmins in the districts, and English sahibs."

Sumer Singh founded the Patna-Kavi-Samaj, at the request of Patna University students, where he mentored students on their poetry. Sumer Singh mentored and taught a poet, Ayodhya Prasad Upadhyay, who took the penname, nom-de-plume, Hariaudh from the inspiration of Sumer Singh's pen name, 'Sumer Hari'.

Sumer Singh viewed poetry as a way to connect, and break divisions between Hindu, Muslim, and Sikh, as his student Ayodhya Prasad Upadhyay writes:

"...in the subject of his poetry (Sumersingh) had great hopes. He wanted his poetry to be spread among the public, and he said that the destruction of differences between Sikhs and Hindus might be accomplished by this means."

Sumer Singh was politically involved with Khem Singh Bedi and others of the Amritsar Singh Sabha in planning to resurrect Sikh rule in Punjab, but their plans were destroyed by the British along with the support received by the Lahore Singh Sabha.

== Gallery ==
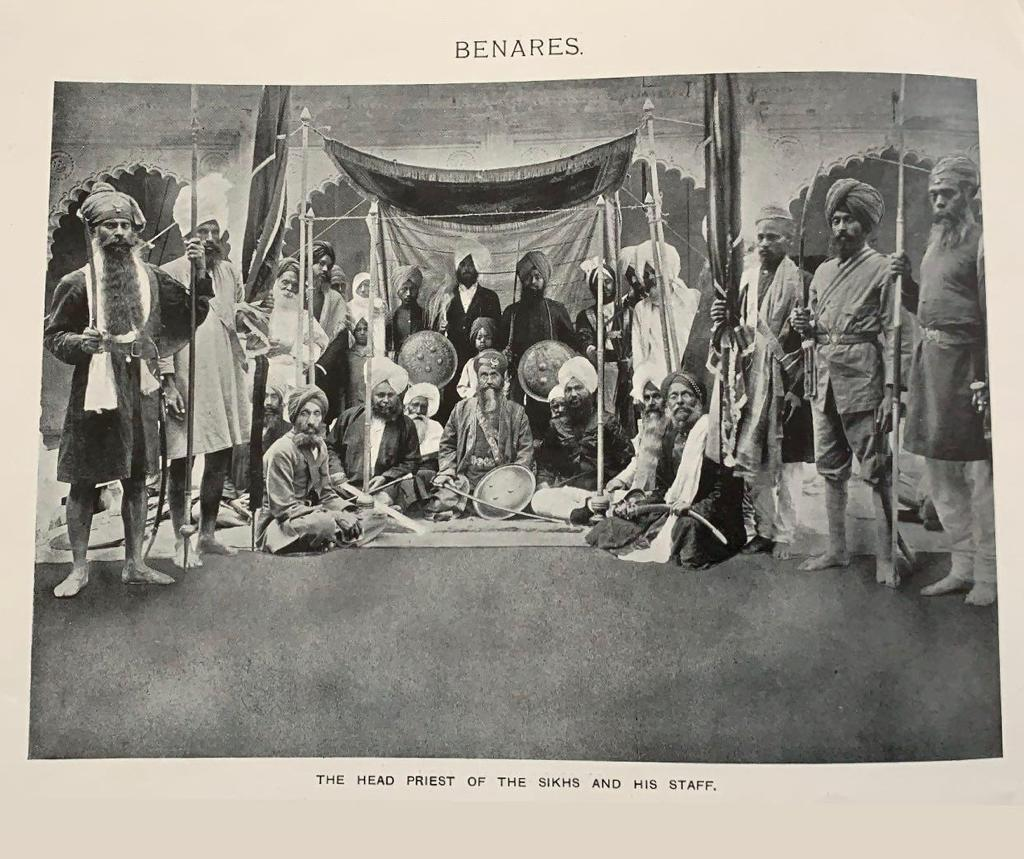
Baba Sumer Singh Bhalla

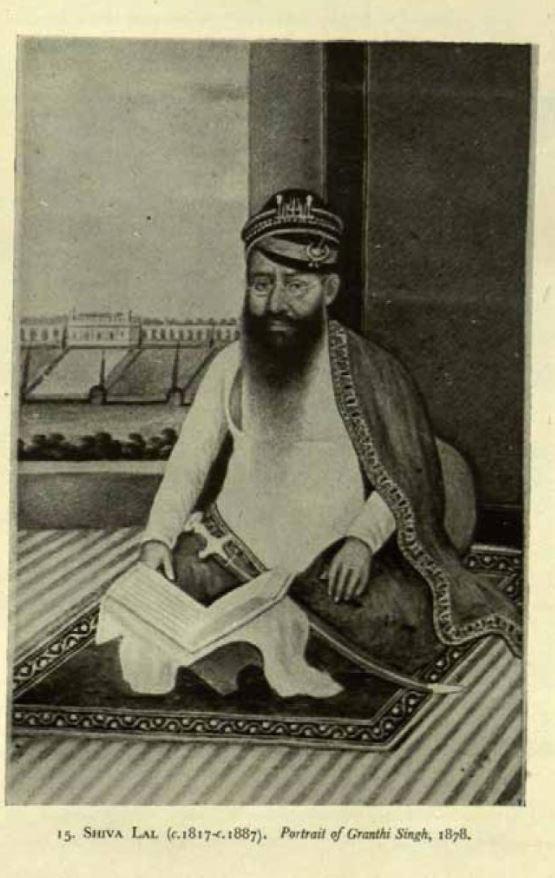
Baba Sumer Singh Bhalla
