= Gurdwara Handi Sahib =

Gurdwara in Bihar, India

- Location in Bihar

Religion
- Affiliation: Sikhism

Location
- Location: Danapur, Patna
- State: Bihar
- Country: India
- Coordinates: 25°36′28.77″N 85°10′3.06″E

Architecture
- Creator: unknown
- Completed: First build - unknown Final Rebuild - 1980

Gurdwara Handi Sahib is situated in Danapur is a cantonment station, 20 km west of old Patna City. Guru Tegh Bahadur had returned to Punjab in April 1670 leaving his family behind at Patna. The family after leaving Patna Sahib made their first halt here. An old lady named Jamani Mai served a kettleful (handi) of khichari to them after which the shrine subsequently built here was named as Handiwali Sangat, which is now called Gurdwara Handi Sahib. Son of Mata jamni Mai Mathura Singh donated the land on which the gurudwara was built and his family members still live there under guardianship of Sri Arun Singh, still rendering services inherited by his great grandfathers.

== See also ==
- Takht Sri Patna Sahib
- Takht Sri Harmandir Sahib
- Takht Sri Keshgarh Sahib
- Takht Sri Damdama Sahib
- Takht Sri Hazur Sahib
