= Patna City =

Historic neighbourhood in Patna district, Bihar, India

Patna City Patna Saheb (Patna Sahib)
- Neighbourhood
- Location in Patna, India
- Coordinates: 25°35′10″N 85°11′4″E
- Country: India
- State: Bihar
- Metro: Patna

Government
  - Body: Patna Municipal Corporation

Languages
  - Spoken: Hindi, English (main official), Angika, Maithili, Magahi, Bhojpuri, Urdu and Punjabi (liturgical)
- Time zone: UTC+5:30 (IST)
- PIN: 800009, 800008, 800007
- Planning agency: Patna Regional Development Authority
- Civic agency: Patna Municipal Corporation
- Lok Sabha: Patna Sahib (Lok Sabha constituency)
- Vidhan Sabha: Patna Sahib (Vidhan Sabha constituency)

Patna City, popularly known as Patna Saheb or Patna Sahib, is a city and one of the 6 Sub-divisions (Tehsil) in Patna district, Bihar, India. Patna City is an old area of Patna. Patna City history belongs to Patliputra. It is regarded as very sacred by the Sikhs in India. The tenth Guru of the Sikhs, Guru Gobind Singh was born there. The Patna Saheb Gurudwara is considered to be one of the holiest of the five "Takhts" or seat of authority of the Sikhs. The place is named Harminder Takht though the Sikhs respectfully call it Patna Sahib. The famous Guru Gobind Sahib Gurudwara is an important shrine for Sikhs from all over the world. Ashok Rajpath (road) connects Patna City to Patna.

== Overview ==
Bengali Colony, Jhauganj, Lodi Katra, Rambagh, Kali Asthan, Nehru Tola, Marufganj, Harmandir Gali, Machratta, Hajiganj, Mirchai Gali, Bihar Mills Colony are major areas of Patna City. The main Guru Gobind Road connects Patna Sahib Gurudwara and Patna City Chowk. Mangal Talab is a water body located here. Patna City has all sorts of facilities like schools, hospitals for its residents. Other than Sikh Religious center it has a number of Hindu Temples and Mosques. It has a number of Boarding and Lodging facilities around religious centers. Patna Ghat is the Ganga side Ghat flowing in north of Patna City. Today, Patna City is also a major trading centre.

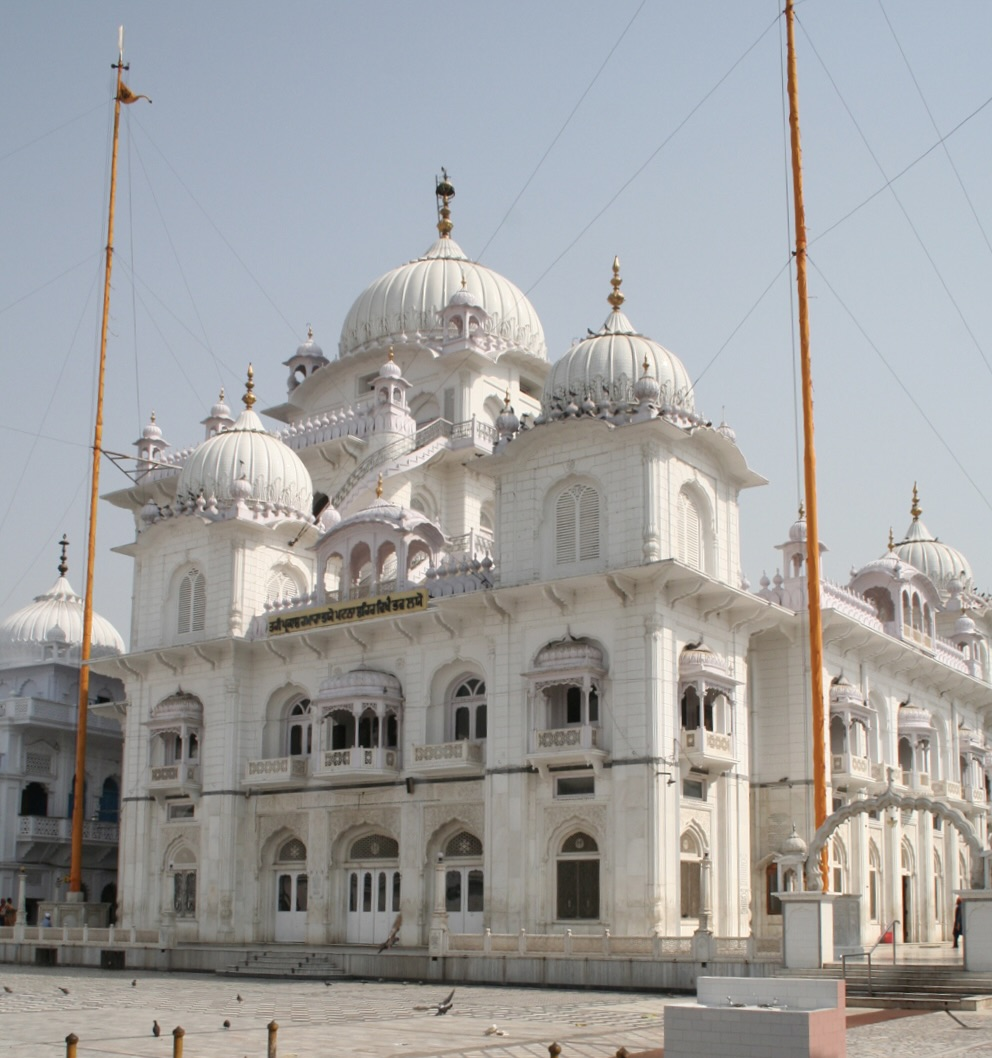
Takht Sri Harmandir Sahib, Patna Saheb

== Administration ==
The Patna City sub-division (Tehsil) is headed by an IAS or state Civil service officer of the rank of Sub Divisional Magistrate (SDM).

=== Blocks ===
The Patna City Tehsil is divided into 3 Blocks, each headed by a Block Development Officer (BDO). List of Blocks is as follows:

1. Fatuha
2. Daniyawaan
3. Khusrupur

== Tourism ==
- Kamaldah Jain Temple
- Sanwaliya Ji Mandir, Hajiganj.
- Shri Jalla Mahavir Mandir
- Rani Sati Dadi Mandir, Mirchai Gali
- Shri Shyam Mandir, Raja Ram Lane
- Shri Kale Hanuman Mandir
- Bal Leela Gurudwara, Maini Sangat
- Bahari Begumpur (a historic place)
- Khanqah Emadia Qalandaria, Mangal Talab
- Khanqah Munamia Hasania, Teeksaal Darguah
- Railway Quarter, Patna City
- Mangal Talab (talab means tank), named after the donor Shri Mangal Lal, a local landlord.
- Kashmiri Bagh (graveyard)
- Old Cemetery, Patna City
- Jalla Area (Hanuman Mandir, Shani mandir)
- Manoj Kamaliya Stadium, a small outdoor stadium at Mangal Talab.
- Takht Sri Harimandir Sahib Ji
- Gurudwara Shri Guru Ka Bagh
- Paschim Darwaza, a historical monument of Mauryan period

== Politics ==
The Patna City is part of the Patna Sahib Assembly constituency under the Patna Sahib Lok Sabha constituency.

== Education ==
=== Schools ===
- Arora International School, Patna city
- Guru Gobind Singh Boys School (Government aided)
- Guru Gobind Singh Girls School (Government aided)
- Infant Jesus School
- Jesus and Marry Academy, Patna city
- Little Flower High School
- Marwari High School, Patna City (Government aided)
- Narayani Kanya Vidyalaya (Government aided)
- Patna City Central School
- Patna City High School (Government aided)
- ST. Annes High School
- St. Paul High School, Patna city
- Sudarshan Central School

=== College ===
- Oriental College, Patna City
- Sri Guru Gobind Singh College, Patna
- RPM College, Patna

=== Library ===
- Bihar Hitaishi District Central Library, Patna City (A central government recognized district level library)

== Hospital ==
- Guru Gobind Singh Hospital, Patna City
- Nalanda Medical College and Hospital, Patna city

== Transport ==
=== Railways ===
It has its own railway station, known as Patna Sahib railway station. It is connected to many metropolitan cities of India by the Howrah-Delhi Main Line.

=== Roads ===
The Bus service was started in 2018 by BSRTC 15 buses has been operational on these routes connecting 17 different locations between Gandhi Maidan and Patna City, three major railway stations, including the Patna Junction, Rajendra Nagar Terminal and Patna Sahib station, will be covered under the new route called ‘555’. The route has been named ‘555’ as a sign of respect for Panj Pyare — the five beloved ones of Sikh Guru Gobind Singh.

State government is also planning to upgrade current three-wheelers (autos) which are emitting carbon dioxide on higher level due to petrol based engine to CNG operated autos, they will be upgraded on government subsidy PPP partnership either exchanged or made petrol to CNG emission adaptable by installing P2G CNG kits. Currently electronic operated rickshaws (tuktuks) can be easily seen on the roads of Patna City.

== Police Stations ==
The following Police Stations of Patna Police serve this area:

- Chowk Police Station
- Deedarganj Police Station
- Khajekalan Police Station

== Notable people ==
- Guru Gobind Singh, The tenth Sikh Guru
- Daler Mehndi, Indian singer and songwriter
- Ravi Shankar Prasad, Ex-Cabinet Minister in Narendra Modi Ministry, Member of Parliament, Patna Sahib
- Shatrughan Sinha, Member of Parliament,Asansol, Ex-Member of Parliament Patna Sahib, Former Cabinet Minister in Third Vajpayee Ministry
- Nitin Nabin, Cabinet Minister in Ninth Nitish ministry
- Nand Kishore Yadav, Current MLA from Patna Sahib Constituency
