= Gurdwara Gobind Ghat =

Gurdwara in Bihar, India

Gurudwara Gobind Ghat
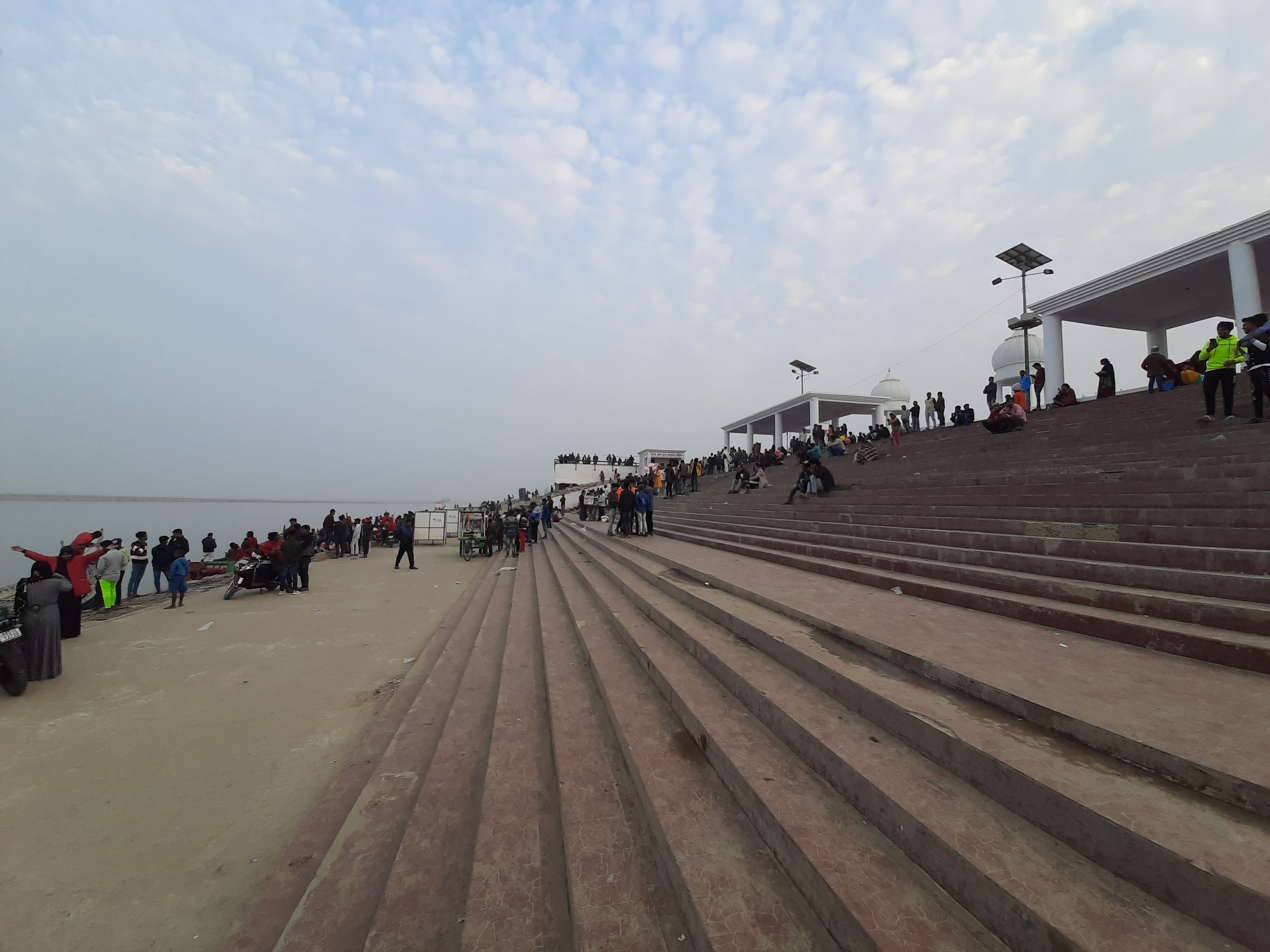

- Location in Bihar Location in India

Religion
- Affiliation: Sikhism
- Deity: Guru

Location
- Location: Patna
- State: Bihar
- Country: India
- Coordinates: 25°36′28.77″N 85°10′3.06″E

Gurdwara Sri Guru Gobind Singh Ghat, also known as Gurudwara Kangan Ghat, is a Sikh place of worship on the banks of the Ganges River approximately 650 m (710 yd) from Takht Sri Patna Sahib. In Sikh historical sources, this is the place where Guru Gobind Singh threw his gold bangle (kangan) and passed on the knowledge of Guru Granth Sahib to Pandit Shiv Dutt, a devotee of Sri Ram Chandra.

The ghat is located near Patna Sahib Station in the state of Bihar. It is marked by a gateway with the Gurudwara on top of it.

== See also ==
- Ghats in Bhagalpur
- Ghats in Varanasi
