= Gurdwara Guru ka Bagh =

Gurudwara Guru ka Bagh
- Location in Bihar

Religion
- Affiliation: Sikhism
- Deity: Guru

Location
- Location: Patna
- State: Bihar
- Country: India
- Coordinates: 25°36′28.77″N 85°10′03.06″E

Architecture
- Completed: unknown

About three kilometers east of Takht Sri Patna Sahib is where Guru Tegh Bahadur first alighted in a garden (bagh) belonging to Nawabs Rahim Bakhsh and Karim Bakhsh, nobles of Patna, and where the sangat of Patna along with the young Guru Gobind Singh came out to receive him back from his four-year-long odyssey. A shrine commemorative of the first meeting of Tegh Bahadur and Gobind Singh was established here. Its present building was constructed during the 1970s and 1980s. An old well which is still in use and a dried stump of the Imli tree under which the sangat met Guru Tegh Bahadur still exists.

== See also ==
- Akal Takht
- Takht Sri Keshgarh Sahib
- Takht Sri Damdama Sahib
- Takht Sri Hazur Sahib
- Takhat Shiri Patna Sahib
