= Panj Takht =

Five major Sikh temples in India

Locations of the five Takhts of Sikhism in India

A takht, or takhat (Punjabi: ਤਖ਼ਤ), literally means a throne or seat of authority and is a spiritual and temporal centre of Sikhism. There are five takhts (Punjabi: ਪੰਜ ਤਖਤ, romanized: Pañj takhat, lit. 'five thrones'), which are five gurudwaras that have a very special significance for the Sikh community. Three are located in Punjab whilst the remaining two are located outside of it.

The first and the most important takht was established by Guru Hargobind in 1609: Akal Takht (the Throne of the Timeless God), located just opposite the gate of Harmandir Sahib (The Golden Temple), in Amritsar. While the Harmandir Sahib, or Golden Temple, represents Sikh spiritual guidance, the Akal Takht symbolizes the dispensing of justice and temporal activity. It is the highest seat of temporal authority of the Khalsa and the seat of the Sikh religion's earthly authority. There, the Guru held his court and decided matters of military strategy and political policy. Later on, the Sikh Nation (Sarbat Khalsa) took decisions here on matters of peace and war and settled disputes between the various Sikh groups.

In December 2010, the Deccan Odyssey train, taken on charter from the Government of Maharashtra, started with the aim to have a journey across four Sikh takhts, with a flight by devout and sightseers to the fifth takht (Takht Sri Patna Sahib). A special train for the pilgrimage to the five takhts, named Panj Takht Special Train, began service on 16 February 2014.

== Akal Takht ==
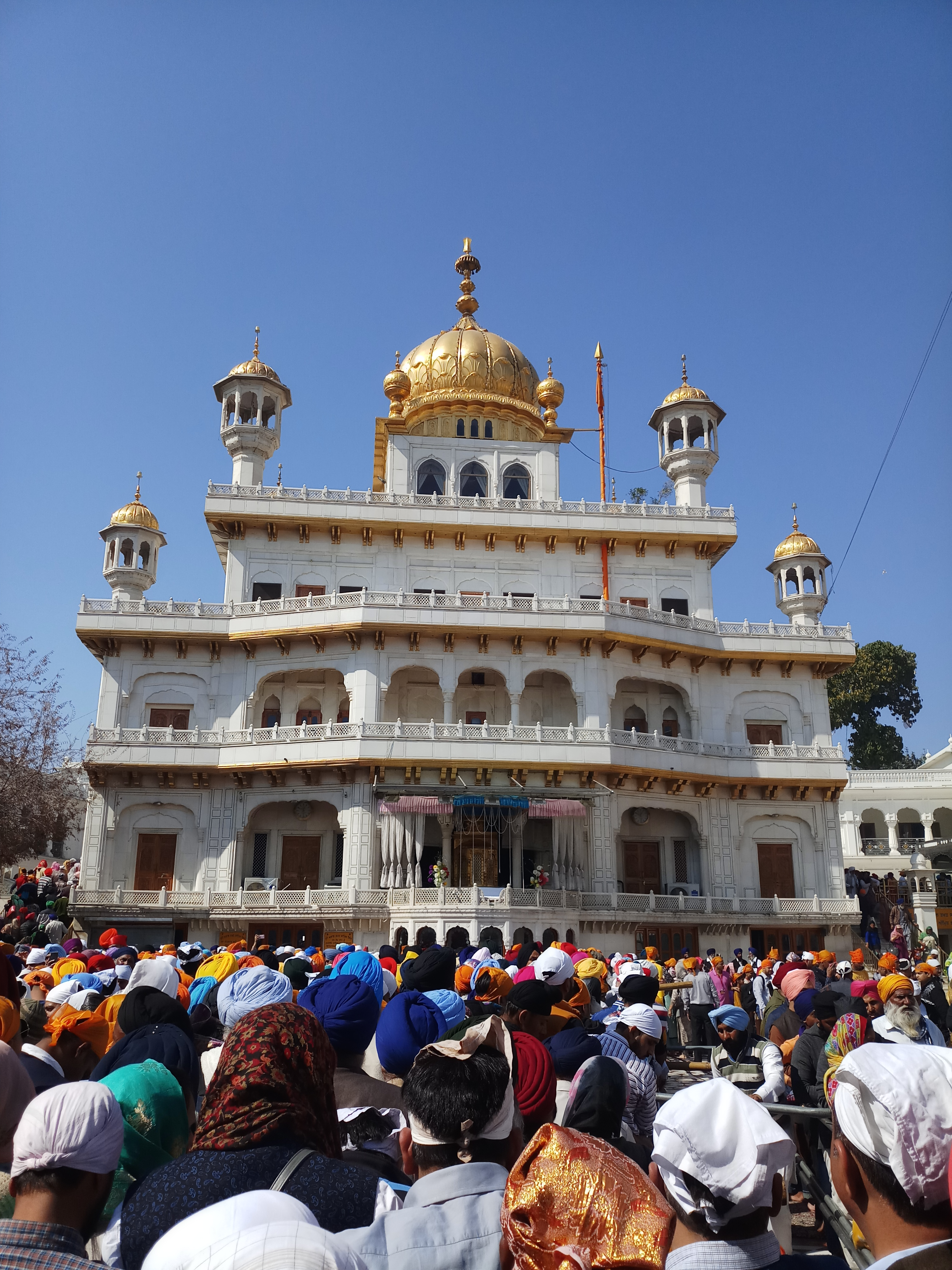
Akal Takht.

Akal Takhat Sahib means Eternal Throne. It is also part of the Golden Temple complex in Amritsar. Its foundation was laid by Guru Hargobind, the sixth Sikh guru. The Akal Takhat is situated opposite to Harmandir Sahib and is connected by a passage. The building of the Akal Takht opposite the Golden Temple has a special meaning. While the Golden Temple stands for spiritual guidance the Akal Takhat symbolizes the dispensing of justice and temporal activity. In earlier days all Sikh warriors sought blessings here before going to battle fields. During the 18th century while Sikhs were fighting a guerrilla war in the forests they used to gather at the Akal Takht on special occasions such as Vaisakhi. Here the community used to have general meetings and approve resolutions. The Akal Takht is the oldest of the Five Takhats.

== Takht Keshgarh Sahib ==
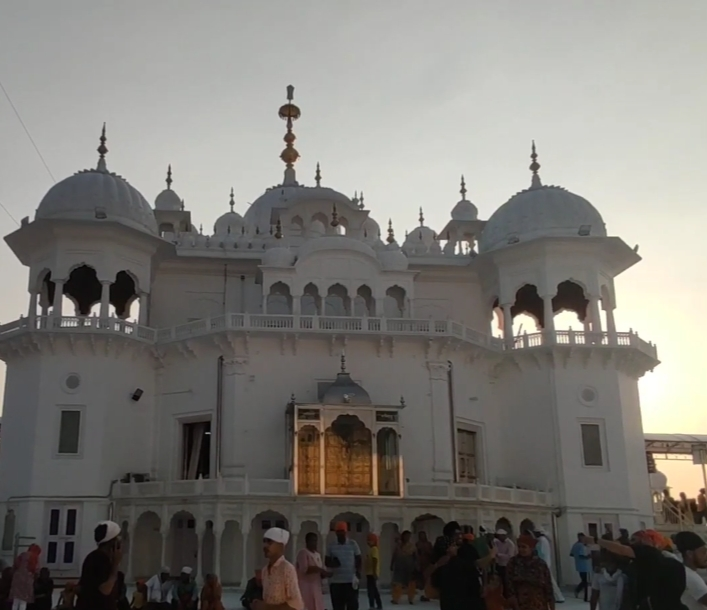
Takht Kesgarh Sahib, Anandpur Sahib

Takht Sri Keshgarh Sahib is one of the five Takhts in Sikhism and is located in the city of Anandpur Sahib, Punjab, India. It is historically significant as the birthplace of the Khalsa, the collective body of initiated Sikhs. On Vaisakhi, 13 April 1699, the tenth Sikh Guru, Guru Gobind Singh, founded the Khalsa Panth by initiating the first five Sikhs, known as the Panj Pyare ("Five Beloved Ones"), through the sacred nectar known as Amrit. This event marked a defining moment in Sikh history, symbolizing spiritual sovereignty, martial courage, and egalitarian values.

The Takht served as both a spiritual and military center during Guru Gobind Singh’s time. The complex includes the main sanctum housing the Takht and several other structures commemorating significant Sikh traditions. Relics of the Guru, including his weapons and personal items, are preserved here, emphasizing the martial legacy of Sikhism.

Every year, during the Vaisakhi festival, thousands of Sikhs from around the world gather at Takht Sri Keshgarh Sahib to commemorate the birth of the Khalsa and to pay homage to the Guru’s vision of an egalitarian and sovereign Sikh identity.

== Takht Damdama Sahib ==
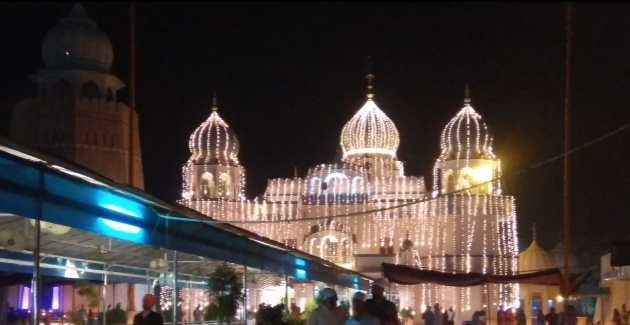
Takht Sri Damdama Sahib

Takht Sri Damdama Sahib is located in Talwandi Sabo, near the city of Bathinda. The name Damdama means "resting place" as it is the site where Guru Gobind Singh stayed after a number of defensive battles, including the Battle of Chamkaur and the Battle of Muktsar. Historically, Takht Sri Damdama Sahib is the location where Guru Gobind Singh compiled the complete version of the Guru Granth Sahib. As a result, this site has become a popular location for Sikh writers and scholars. Guru Gobind Singh stayed here for about a year and compiled the final edition of Guru Granth Sahib also known as the Damdama Sahib Bir in 1705. Damdama Sahib was proclaimed the fifth takht on November 18, 1966.

== Takht Patna Sahib ==
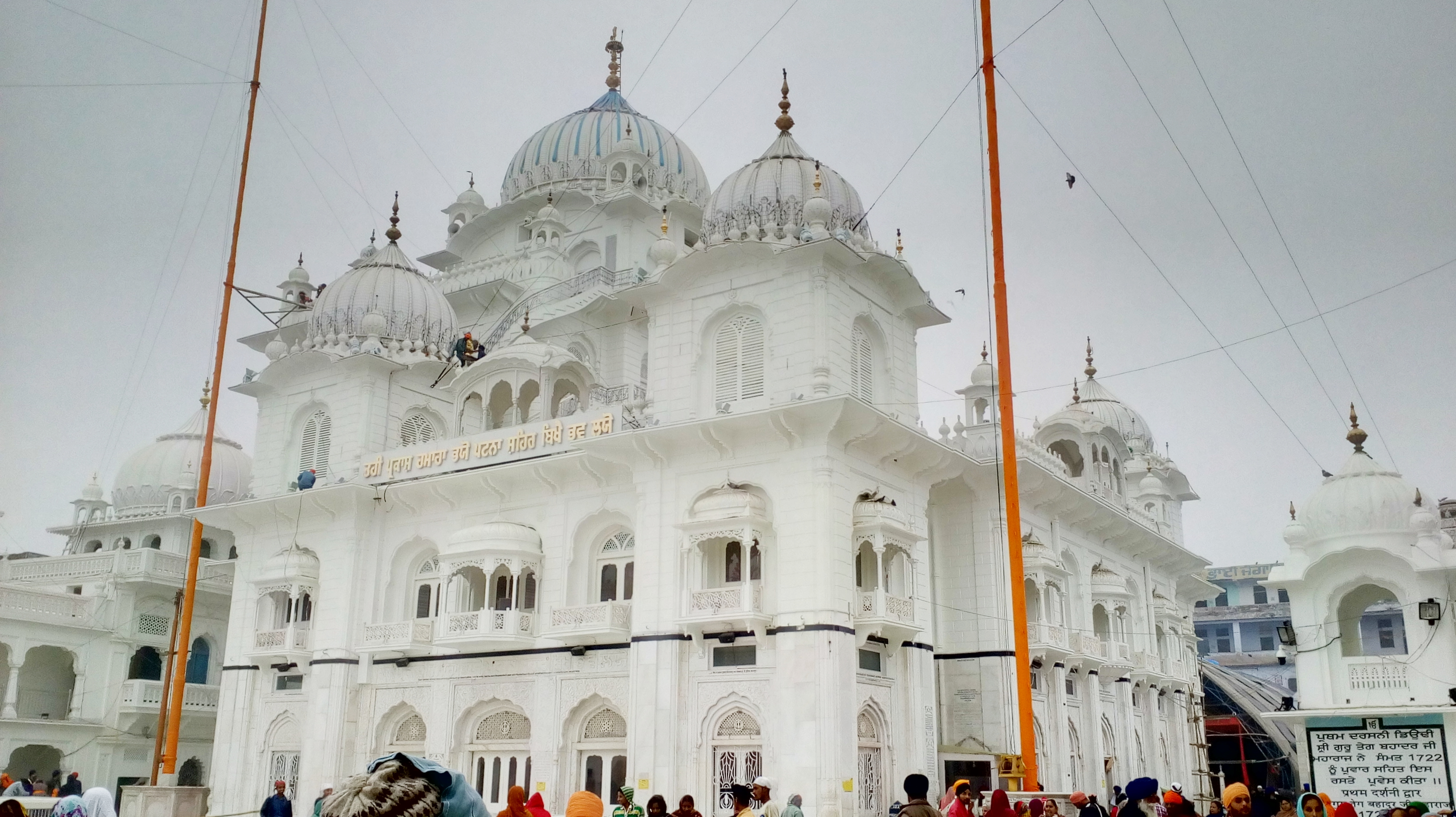
Takht Sri Patna Sahib.

Takht Sri Patna Sahib is situated in Patna city which is also the capital of Bihar state. Guru Gobind Singh was born here in 1666 and He spent His early childhood here before moving to Sri Anandpur Sahib. Besides being the birthplace of Guru Gobind Singh, Patna was also visited by Guru Nanak and Guru Tegh Bahadur at different points of time. Here also stayed Guru Gobind Singh's mother, Mata Gujri and it was house of Salis Rai Johri.

== Takht Hazur Sahib ==
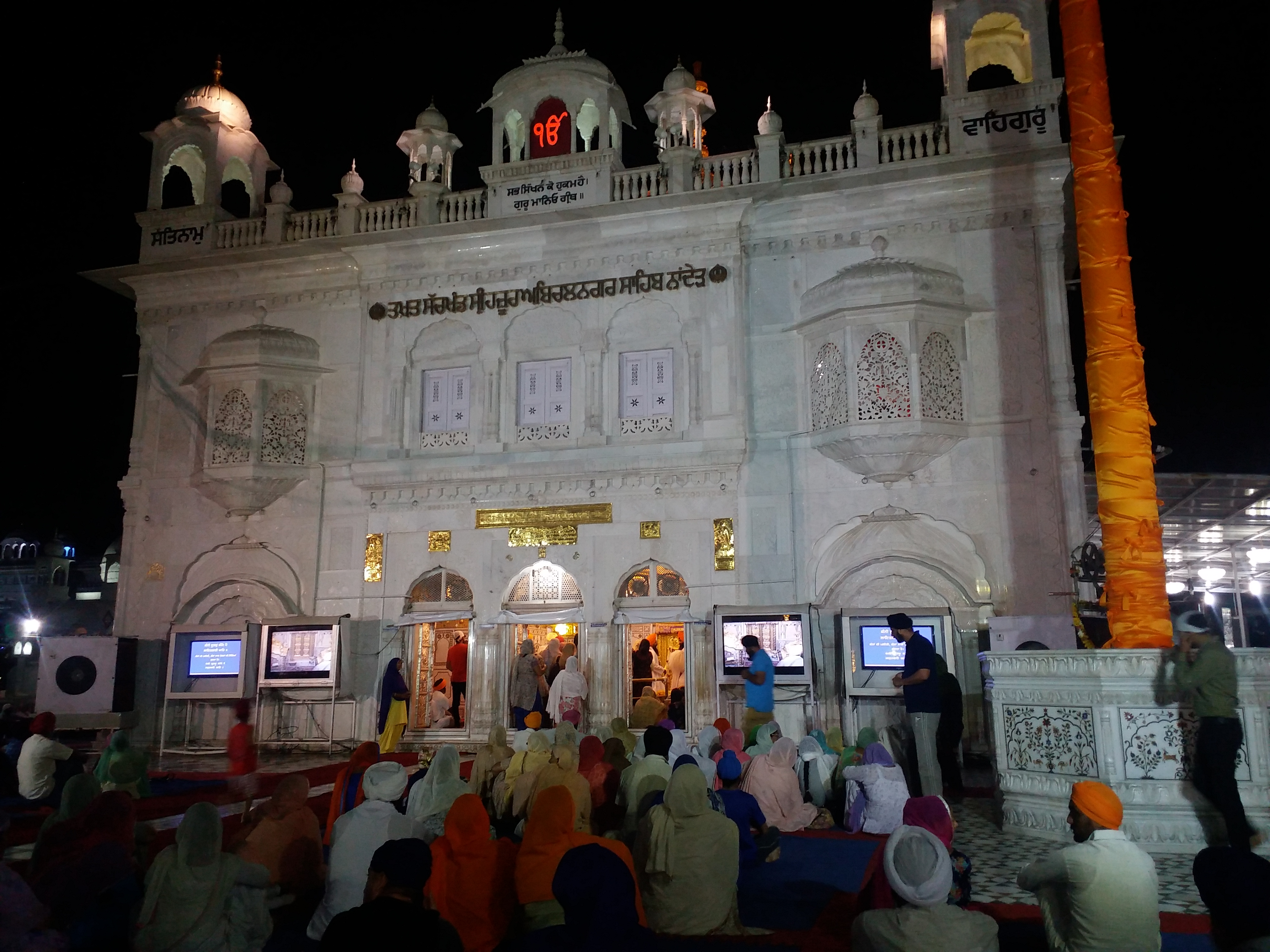
Hazur Sahib, Nanded

Takht Sri Hazur Sahib, one of the five Takhts in Sikhism, is of profound historical and spiritual importance. It is located in Nanded, Maharashtra, on the banks of the Godavari River. This Takht holds special significance as it was established near the site where the tenth Sikh Guru, Guru Gobind Singh, delivered his final sermon and died in 1708.

The current shrine, known as Hazur Sahib, was constructed in the early 19th century by Maharaja Ranjit Singh. Architecturally, it combines Sikh architecture and Rajput architecture styles, featuring white marble domes and intricate artwork.

The shrine is managed by the Shiromani Gurdwara Parbandhak Committee (SGPC) and remains a prominent pilgrimage destination. Numerous Sikh festivals and events are celebrated here annually, including Hola Mohalla and major Gurpurabs.

The inner sanctum, known as Sachkhand, houses several relics of Guru Gobind Singh, including his weapons, clothing, and manuscripts. The Guru Granth Sahib is also enshrined there, making it a sacred space for worship and remembrance. Thousands of devotees from around the world visit Hazur Sahib to connect with the legacy and teachings of the tenth Guru.

== Others ==
=== Contested ===
==== Takht Budha Dal ====
According to the Budha Dal organization of Nihangs, the Budha Dal is the fifth takht, completely rejecting Damdama Sahib's status. Before the 1960s, Talwandi Sabo was known almost solely as the official headquarters of the Budha Dal. The SGPC is argued by the Budha Dal to have crowned Damdama Sahib the fifth takht for political reasons and to spite the Nihang Sikhs. Before this, two of the Takhts followed the SGPC's protocols (namely Sri Akaal Takht Sahib, Amritsar and Takht Sri Kesgarh Sahib, Anandpur Sahib) with the other two outside of Punjab practicing their own Nihang-adjacent maryada. This made leadership of the Panth split appear evenly between the two Sikh authorities; this posed even greater threat to the SGPC's sovreignty claims given that the Budha Dal had always openly crowned themselves with the title 'Chakarvarti Chalda Vaheer Panjvaan Takht Akaali Budha Dal' (Forever roaming, eternally free fifth takht, the immortal Budha Dal) on all written documentation. Further to this, the location of the fifth Takht was decided to be within 100 metres (less than a minute's walk) in front of the Budha Dal's long-established formal headquarters. The structure of the SGPC-appointed Takht Damdama Sahib is built on a significantly elevated, much higher platform on top of an already naturally raised mound, physically blocking and towering over the central gurdwara of the Budha Dal. Unlike any of the other Takhts, the Sri Guru Granth Sahib Ji's throne within the Gurdwara is raised high above the sangat inside the already raised Gurdwara; this directly clashes with Nihang ideology long-established in the area that Dasam Granth and Sarbloh Granth should be installed on the exact same level as the Sri Guru Granth Sahib.

The Nihang Sikhs therefore argue that the SGPC created their own fifth Takht to appear dominant in Sikh politics by controlling the majority of the five supreme Gurdwaras. They also argue this action as an attempt to show supremacy over the Nihang Sikhs by building an SGPC-appointed fifth Takht called Damdama Sahib directly in front of the Budha Dal's headquarters of the same name, belittling their claim of being the Panjvaan Takht.

=== Potential ===
==== Gurudwara Janam Asthan ====
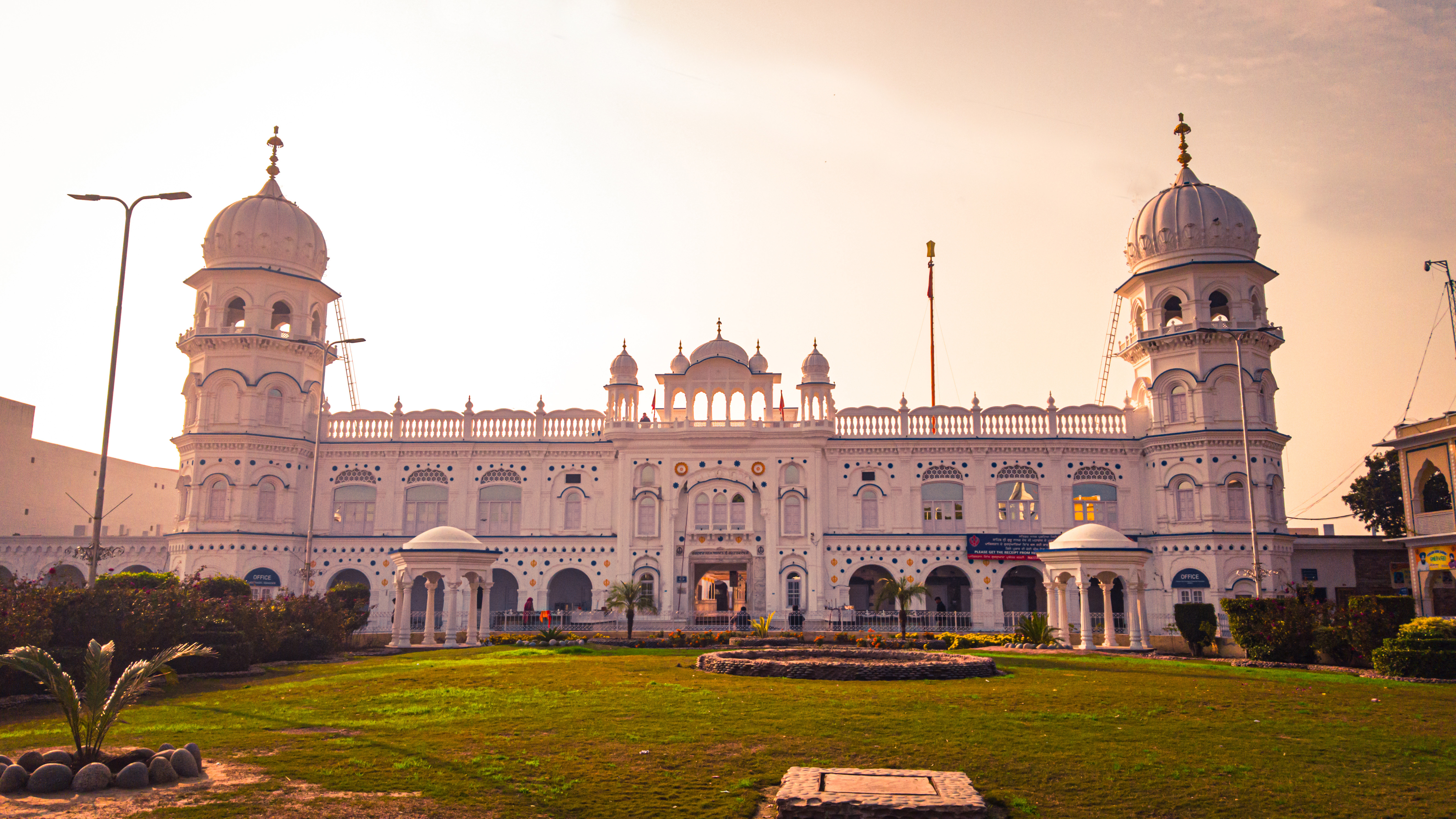
Gurudwara Janam Asthan

A proposal for a sixth Sikh takht at Guru Nanak Dev’s birth place in Nankana Sahib in Pakistan has sparked a debate in the Sikh community, and among historians and scholars.

Shiromani Akali Dal (Delhi) president and former president of Delhi Sikh Gurdwara Management Committee (DSMGC) Paramjit Singh Sarna has stirred a controversy by demanding that Gurdwara Janamasthan Nankana Sahib in Pakistan be declared the sixth takht (seat of authority) of Sikhs. Acting jathedar of Akal Takht, Giani Harpreet Singh was the first to censure the demand, saying: “This is a baseless demand which belittles the concept of Panch Pardhani (significance of five) in Sikhism like five articles of faith, five beloved ones (Panj Payaras) and five Bania.” The proposal was ignored afterwards.
