= Takht Kesgarh Sahib =

Sikh religious site in Anandpur Sahib, Punjab, India

Coordinates: 31°14′6″N 76°29′56″E

Takht Sri Kesgarh Sahib
- Flag of Takht

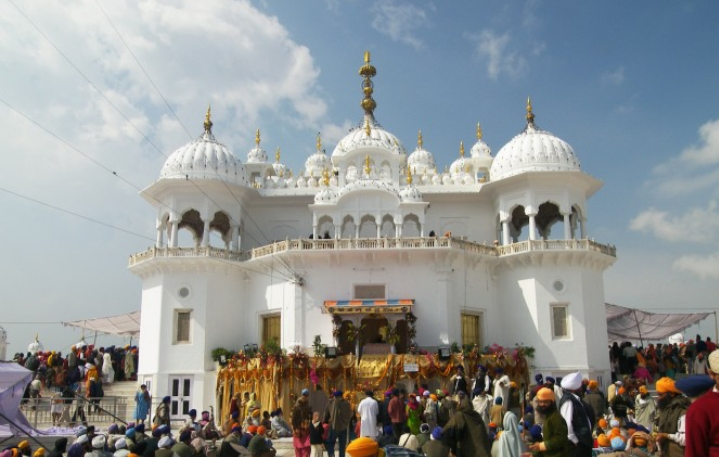

General information
- Status: Takht of the Sikhs
- Architectural style: Sikh architecture
- Location: Anandpur Sahib Rupnagar district, Punjab, India, Anandpur Sahib, India

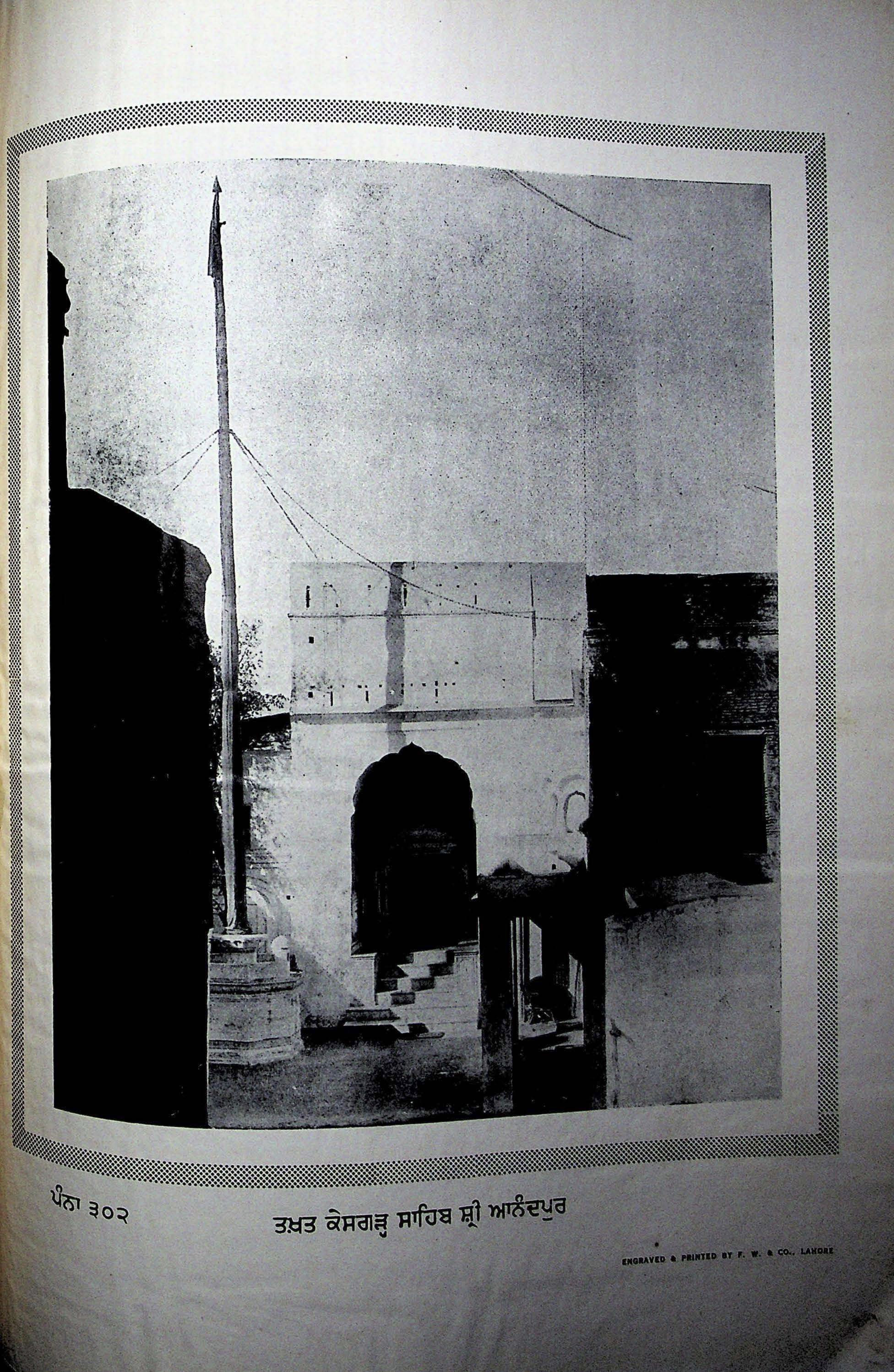
Historical photograph of Takht Keshgarh Sahib

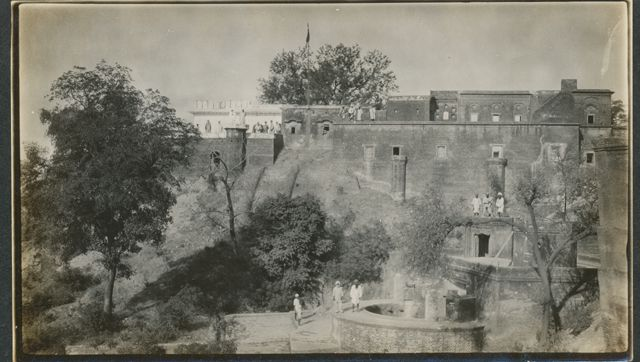
Historical photograph of Qila Anandgarh from May 1934.

Kesgarh Qila or Takht Sri Kesgarh Sahib, alternatively spelt as Keshgarh Qila, is one of the five takhts of the Sikhs located in Anandpur Sahib in Rupnagar district of Punjab, India. It is located just 40 km from Rupnagar city, the district headquarters and 78 km from state capital Chandigarh. The fort is also called Takhat Sri Keshgarh Sahib. This Gurdwara was one of the forts constructed by Guru Gobind Singh at Anandpur Sahib for the defense of the Sikhs. He spent his 25 years at Anandpur Sahib and, to protect the Sikhs from the Rajas of the Hill States and Mughals, began the construction of five defensive Qilas (forts) all around the town.

== History ==
The Takht is one of Five Takht in Sikhism, the Takht name is Takht Sri Kesgarh Sahib being the place where the last two Sikh Gurus, Guru Tegh Bahadur and Guru Gobind Singh, lived. It is also the place where Guru Gobind Singh founded the Khalsa Panth in 1699. In the mid-1930's, a new structure was constructed over the original site and structure of Anandgarh Qila. Originally, the Sarai Ganga tributary of the Sutlej River flowed south-westwards from the site of Anandpur Sahib but it no longer does today as its course has changed.

=== Forts ===
The Qilas (meaning "fortress"), constructed by Guru Gobind Singh at Anandpur Sahib are:

1. Takht Sri Kesgarh Sahib Qila at the center (now a Takhat)

2. Anandgarh Qila ("fort of bliss")

3. Lohgarh Qila (fort of steel)

4. Holgarh Qila ("fort of colour", also known as Agamgarh)

5. Fatehgarh Qila ("fort of victory")

6. Taragarh Qila ("fort of stars")

All the Qilas were joined together with earthworks and tunnels. All Qila Situated at Anandpur Sahib. In this Qilas one Qila is now Takht of Sikhs Takht Sri Kesgarh Sahib Qila. The fort of Anandgarh was located at a central location whilst the forts of Lohgarh, Holgarh, Fatehgarh, and Taragarh formed a circular pattern around it. The original structures of the forts were destroyed by Kar Seva renovators in the 20th century and marble Gurdwaras were constructed in their former location.

== Jathedars of Takht Sri Keshgarh Sahib ==
Name	Assigned by	Term	Reference(s)
Before, there was only one regular granthi.
Gaini Karam Singh	Sarbat Khalsa	?	
Bhai Kharak Singh	Sarbat Khalsa	?	
Gaini Budh Singh	Sarbat Khalsa	?	
Gaini Puran Singh	Sarbat Khalsa	?	
Gaini Amar Singh	Sarbat Khalsa	?	
After the Gurdwara Reform Movement, Jathedar and granthi of the Gurdwara are appointed.
Giani Bir Singh	SGPC	1942 - 31 March 1944	
Giani Waryam Singh	SGPC	1 April 1944 - 31 January 1945	
Giani Bir Singh	SGPC	1 February 1945 - 31 March 1945	
Giani Kartar Singh	SGPC	1 April 1945 - 24 June 1945	
Giani Ajit Singh	SGPC	24 June 1945 - 2 July 1953	
Giani Fauja Singh	SGPC	14 July 1953 - 7 February 1954	
Giani Ajit Singh	SGPC	9 February 1954 - 9 February 1955	
Giani Fauja Singh	SGPC	9 February 1955 - 14 May 1955	
Giani Partap Singh	SGPC	26 May 1955 - 26 June 1955	
Giani Fauja Singh	SGPC	27 June 1955 - 30 April 1957	
Giani Bachittar Singh	SGPC	1 May 1957 - 1961	
Giani Sharam Singh	SGPC	1961 - 3 January 1971	
Giani Balbir Singh	SGPC	4 January 1971 - 13 October 1971	
Giani Gurdial Singh Ajnoha	SGPC	14 October 1971 - 12 March 1980	
Giani Harcharan Singh Mahalon	SGPC	13 March 1980 - 23 January 1987	
Giani Savinder Singh	Sarbat Khalsa	26 January 1986 - 1993	
General Labh Singh	Panthic Committee	June 24 1988 - 12 July 1988	
Giani Balbir Singh	SGPC	30 May 1998 - 21 September 1989	
Prof. Manjit Singh	SGPC	22 September 1989 - 26 May 1991	
Giani Daljit Singh	SGPC	27 May 1991 - 1 January 1992	
Prof. Manjit Singh	SGPC	2 January 1992 - 23 February 2003	
Giani Tarlochan Singh	SGPC	23 February 2003 - 30 July 2013	
Giani Sukhwinder Singh Khujala	SGPC	31 July 2013 - 21 August 2013	
Giani Mal Singh	SGPC	22 August 2013 - 15 August 2017	
Giani Phula Singh	SGPC	16 August 2017 - 23 August 2017	
Giani Raghbir Singh	SGPC	24 August 2017 - 22 June 2023	
Bhai Amrik Singh Ajnala	Sarbat Khalsa	10 November 2015 - 13 November 2017	
Giani Sultan Singh	SGPC	26 June 2023 - 7 March 2025	
Giani Kuldeep Singh Gargaj	SGPC	7 March 2025 - Incumbent	

== Gallery ==
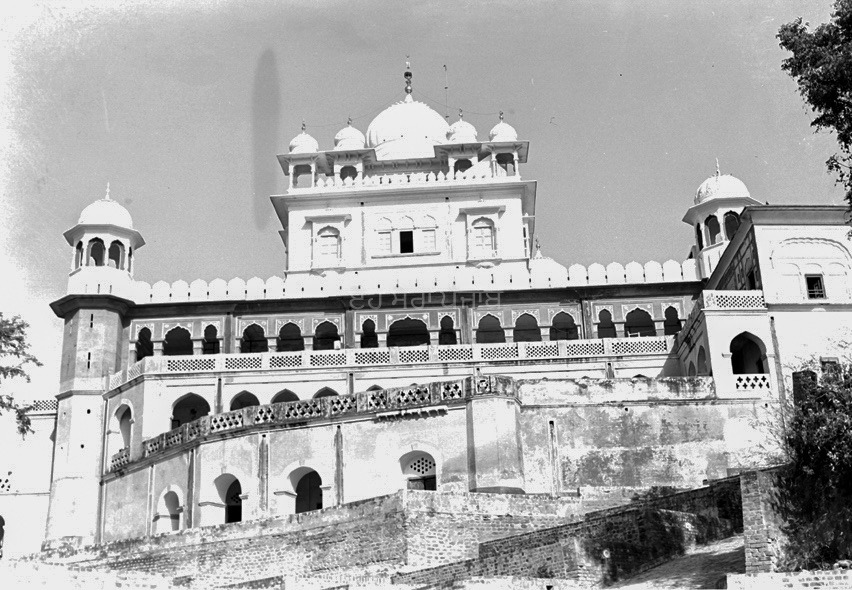
Photograph of Takht Sri Kesgarh Sahib, Anandpur Sahib, Punjab, India, ca.1952

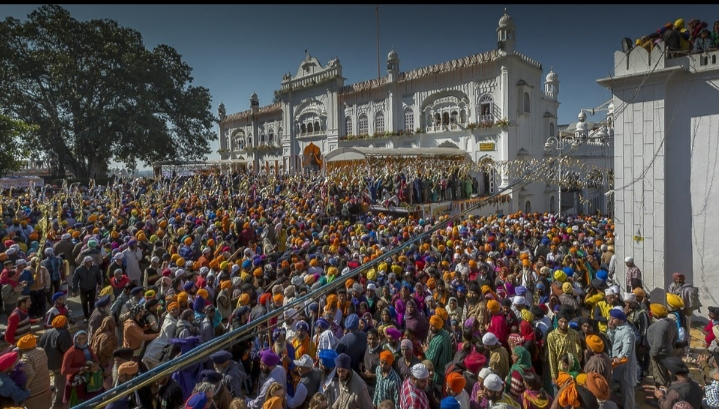
Kesgarh Qila

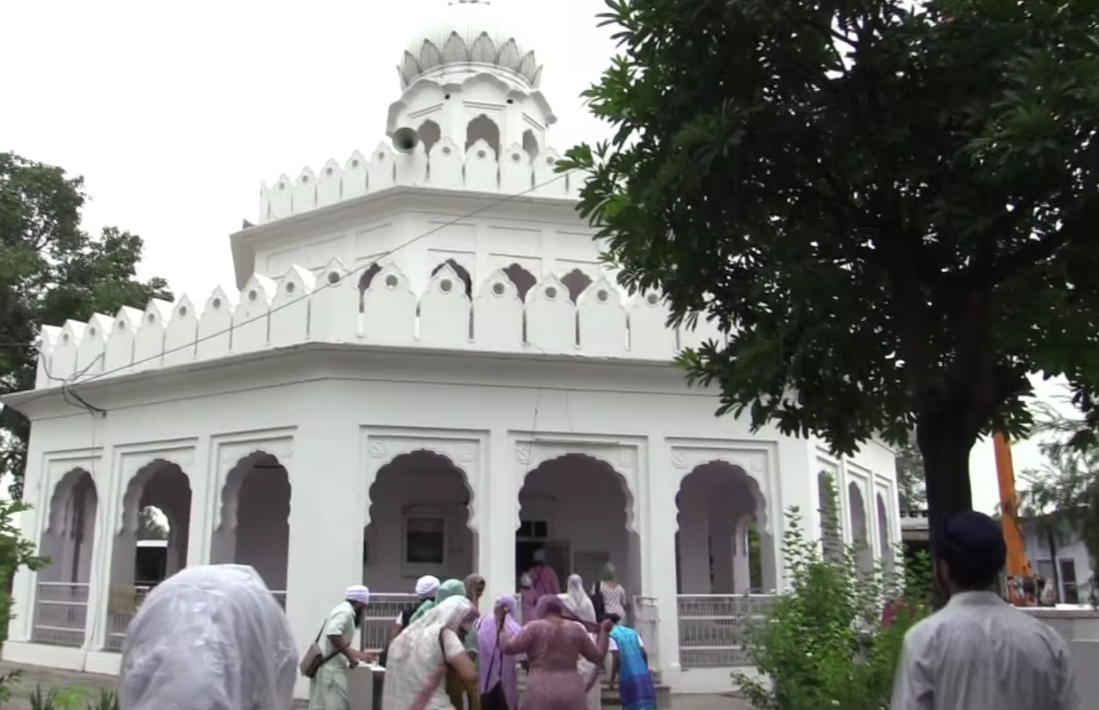
Lohgarh Qila

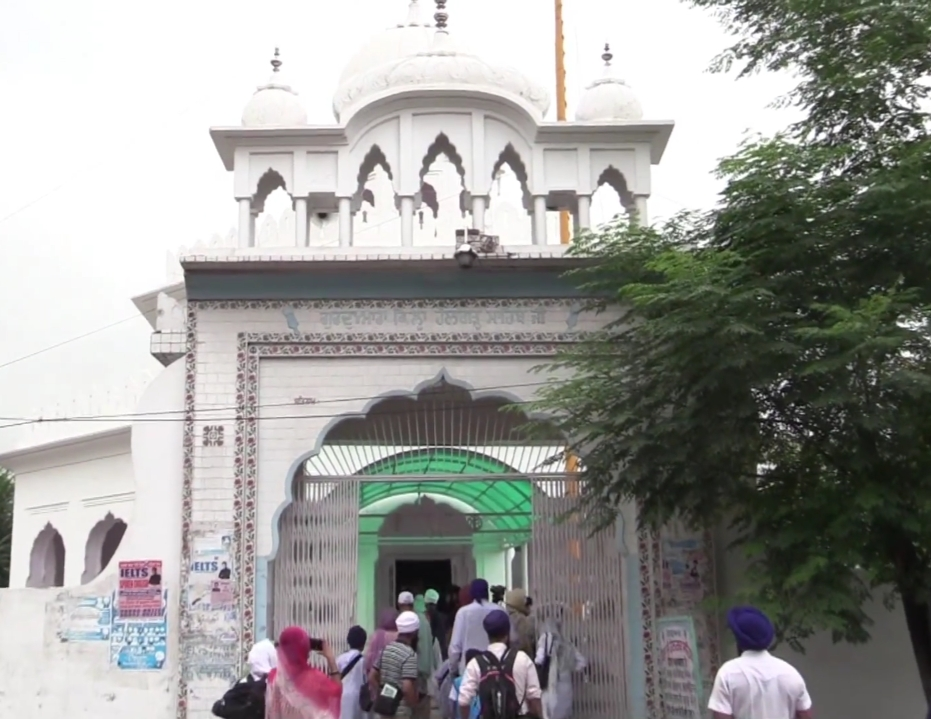
Holgarh Qila

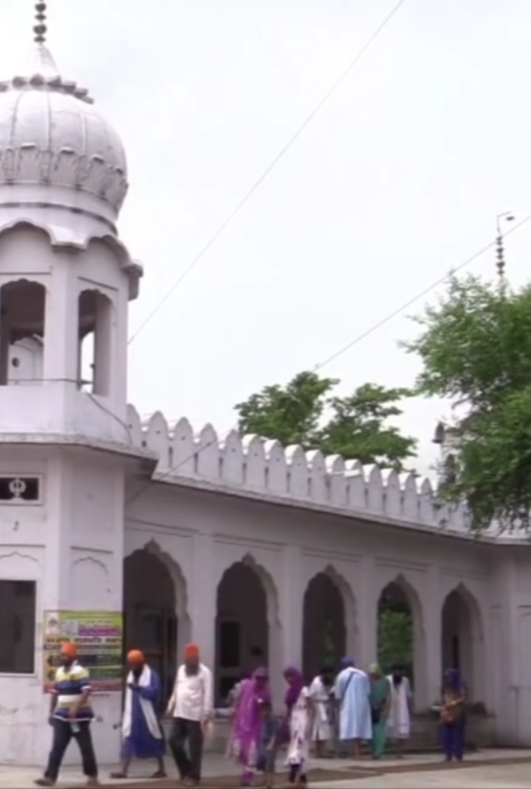
Fatehgarh Qila

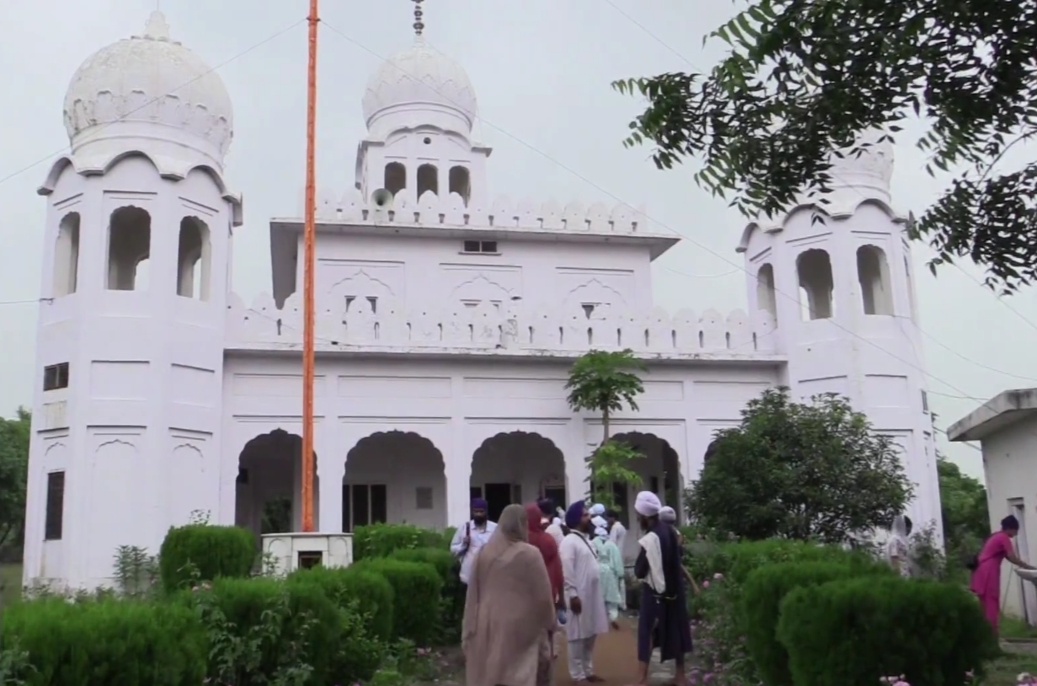
Taragarh Qila
