= Takht Sri Patna Sahib =

Sikh takht in Patna, Bihar, India)

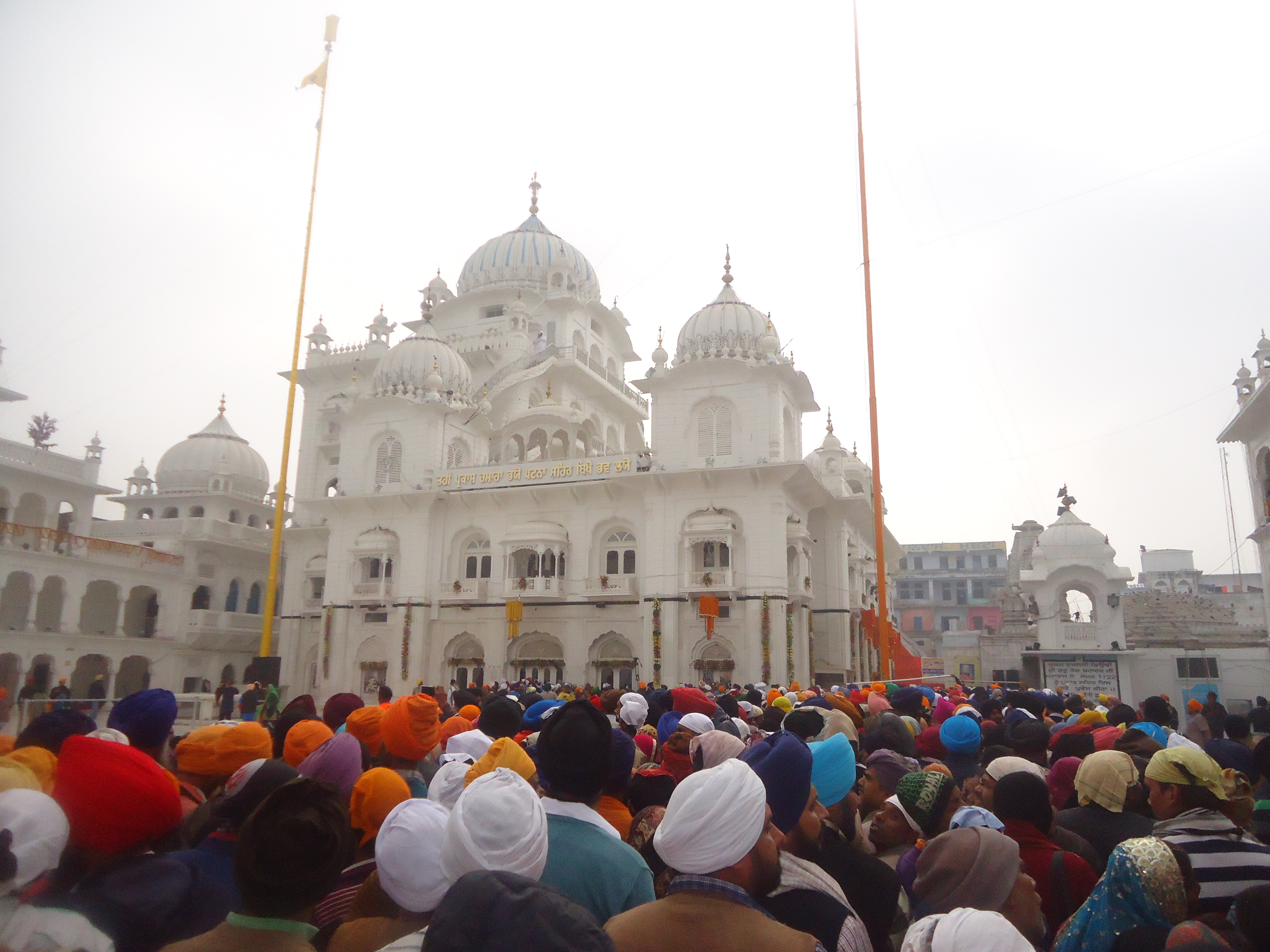
- The facade of Takht Sri Patna Sahib
- Alternative names: Takhat Sri Harimandir Ji, Patna Sahib

General information
- Status: One of five takhats of the Sikhs
- Architectural style: Sikh architecture
- Location: Takhat Sri Harimandir ji, Patna Sahib, Patna, Bihar 800008, India
- Coordinates: 25.59598255803165°N 85.2300015222042°E
- Completed: 18th century
- Renovated: 1839; 19 November 1954
- Renovation cost: ₹20,00,000
- Operator: Takhat Sri Harimandir Ji, Patna Sahib Prabandhak Committee

Website
- takhatpatnasahib.com

Takht Sri Patna Sahib also known as Takhat Sri Harimandir Ji, Patna Sahib, is one of the five takhts of the Sikhs, located in Patna, Bihar, India. The edifice has been reconstructed at least twice; in the early 19th century after a fire and in the mid-20th century after an earthquake.

== History ==
Guru Gobind Singh, the tenth Sikh Guru, was born in Patna on 22 December 1666. He spent his early years here before moving to Anandpur Sahib. Besides being the birthplace of Guru Gobind Singh, Patna was also honored by the visits of Guru Nanak and Guru Tegh Bahadur.

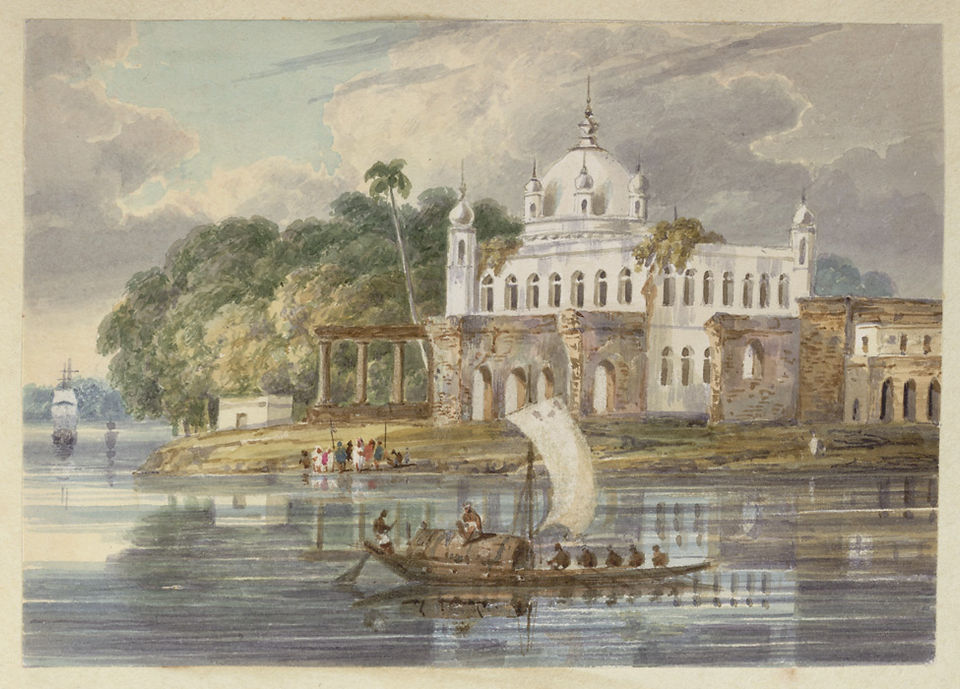
Painting of Takht Sri Patna Sahib, by Sir Charles D’Oyly, August 1820

The site was visited by Sir Charles Wilkins, who wrote an account in 1781, later published in the Asiatic Researches periodical. Shortly after this, the building burnt down in a fire and was subsequently reconstructed by Maharaja Ranjit Singh of the Sikh Empire in the early 19th century, marking again the birthplace of Guru Gobind Singh. Due to the damage caused by an earthquake in 1934, the building was rebuilt between 1948 and 1957 for ₹2,000,000.

The current acting jathedar of Takht Patna Sahib is Baldev Singh, who was appointed by Harpreet Singh, the acting jathedar of the Akal Takht on 2 December 2022.

== Jathedars of Takht Patna Sahib ==
Name	Portrait	Term start:	End:	Reference(s)
Head granthis
Sukha Singh		?	?	
Mahants
Sumer Singh Bhalla		1882	1903	
Jathedars (Note: After the dissolution of the Mahant title after the Gurdwara Reform movement, Jathedars replaced their function. The list now continues with jathedars of Takhat Sri Harmandir Ji, Patna Sahib.)
Bhai Maan Singh			12 August 2000	
Giani Iqbal Singh		13 August 2000	4 March 2019	
Giani Rajinder Singh		5 March 2019	10 September 2019	
Giani Ranjit Singh Gauhar		10 September 2019	28 August 2022	
Giani Baldev Singh		16 September 2022	Incumbent	

== Presidents ==
This is a list of presidents of the Takhat Sri Harimandir Ji, Patna Sahib Prabandhak Committee:

Presidents of Takht Patna Sahib
		Term	
No.	Name	Start	End
1	Lakhbir Sing	1956	1959
2	Surjit Singh Majithia	1959	1962
3	Bakhshish Singh Dhillon	1962	1964
4	Gian Singh Purewal	1964	1967
5	Jagjit Singh Grewal	1967	1970
6	Sohan Singh Raees	1970	1973
(4)	Gian Singh Purewal	1973	1976
7	Jaswant Singh Khochhar	1976	1980
(2)	Surjit Singh Majithia	1980	1982
8	Nirlep Kaur	1982	1984
9	Joginder Singh Jogi	1984	1993
10	Surendrajeet Singh Ahluwalia	1994	2000
11	Mahender Singh Romana	2001	2012
12	R.S. Gandhi	2012	2015
13	Avtar Singh Makkar	February 2015	October 2018
14	Avtar Singh Hit	October 2018	6 September 2022
15	Jagjot Singh Sohi (Acting)	2022	Incumbent

== Gallery ==
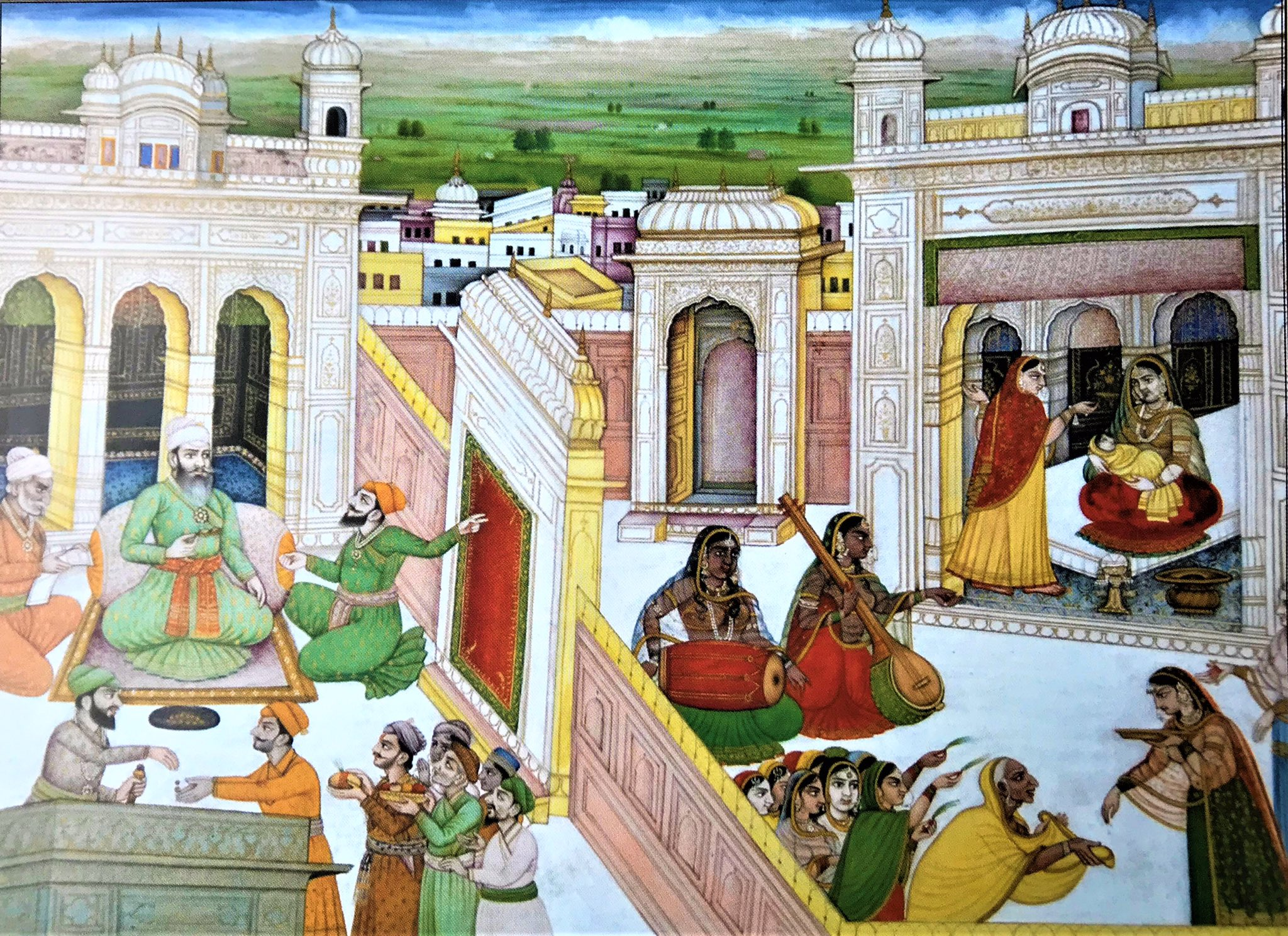
Guru Tegh Bahadur (in Dhaka) being told about the birth of Gobind Rai (in Patna), 19th century painting

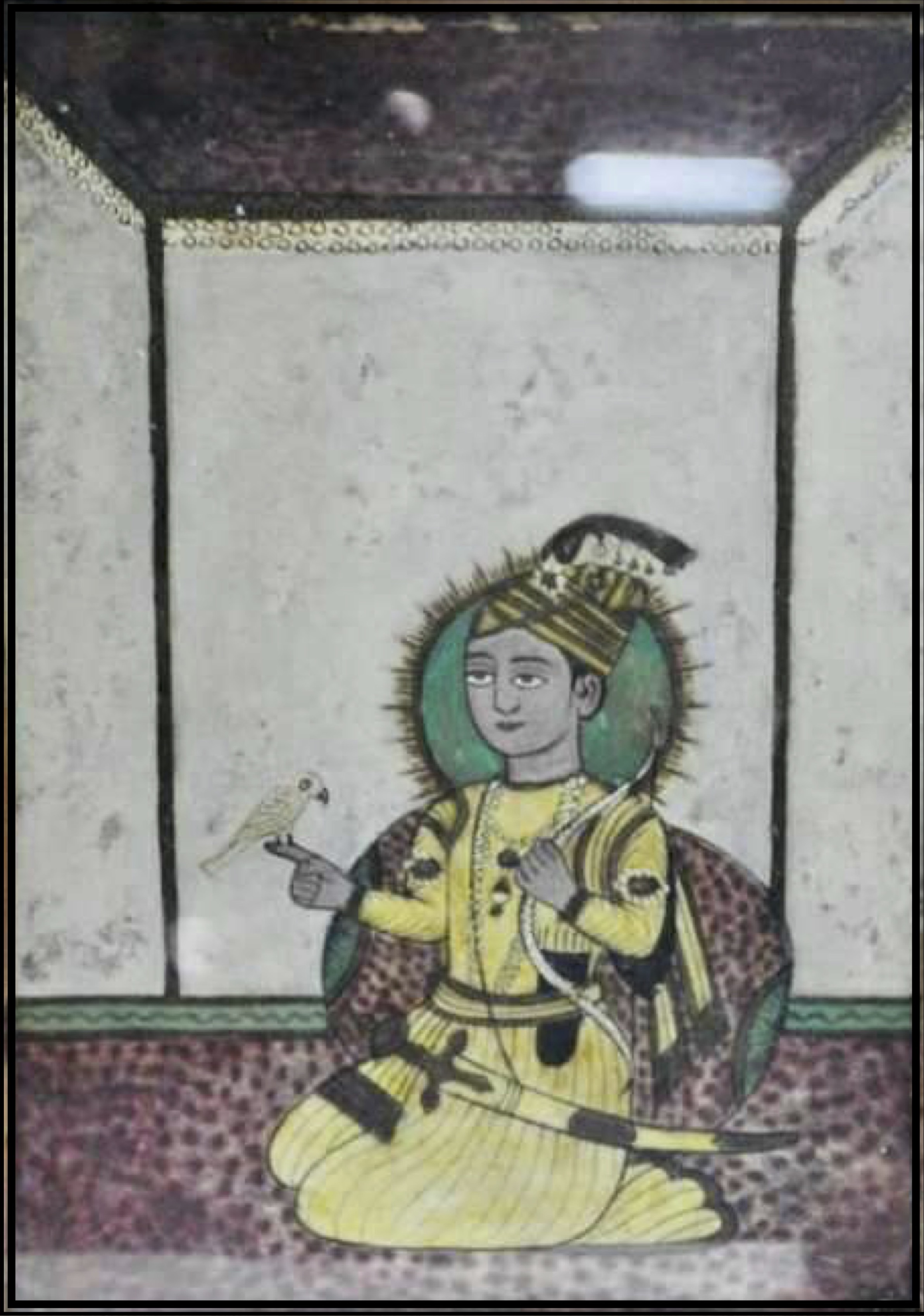
Painting of Guru Gobind Singh in his Bal Saroop (child form, approximately aged 5–6). Painting at Gurdwara Bal Leela Sahib, Sri Patna Sahib

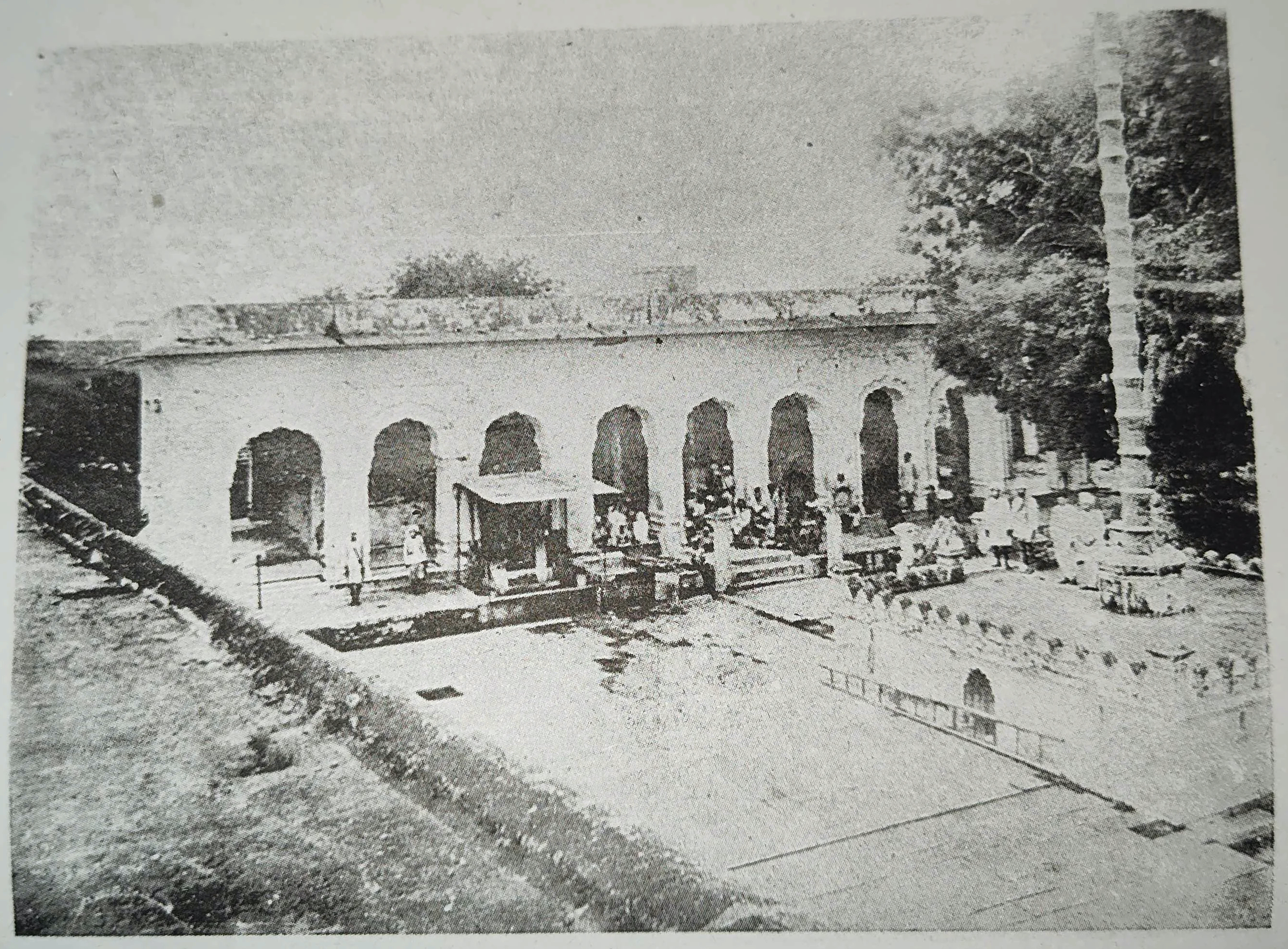
Historical photograph of original Takht Sri Patna Sahib

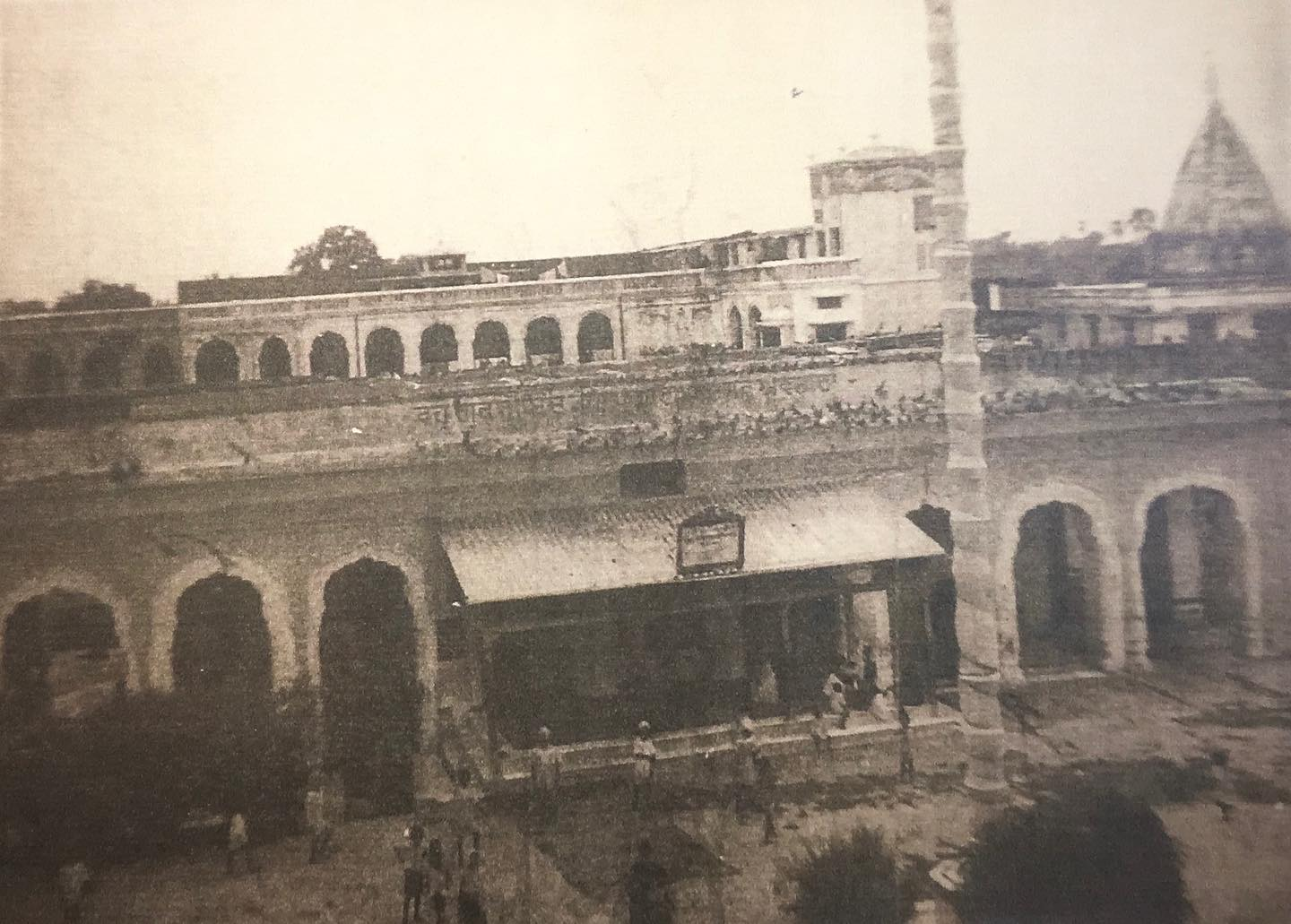
Historic photograph of original gurdwara at Takht Patna Sahib

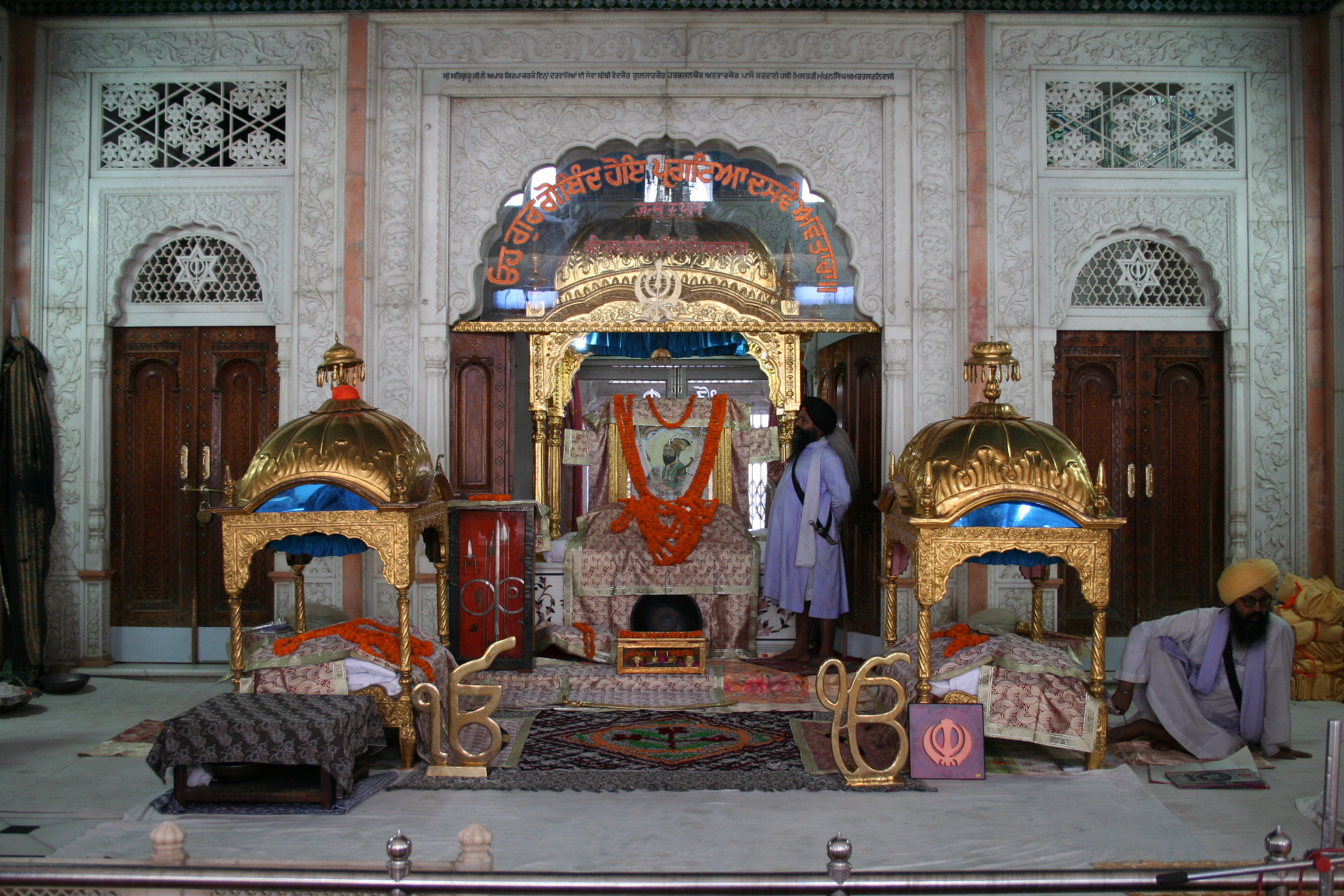
Guru Granth Sahib inside Takhat Sri Harmandir Ji, Patna Sahib.

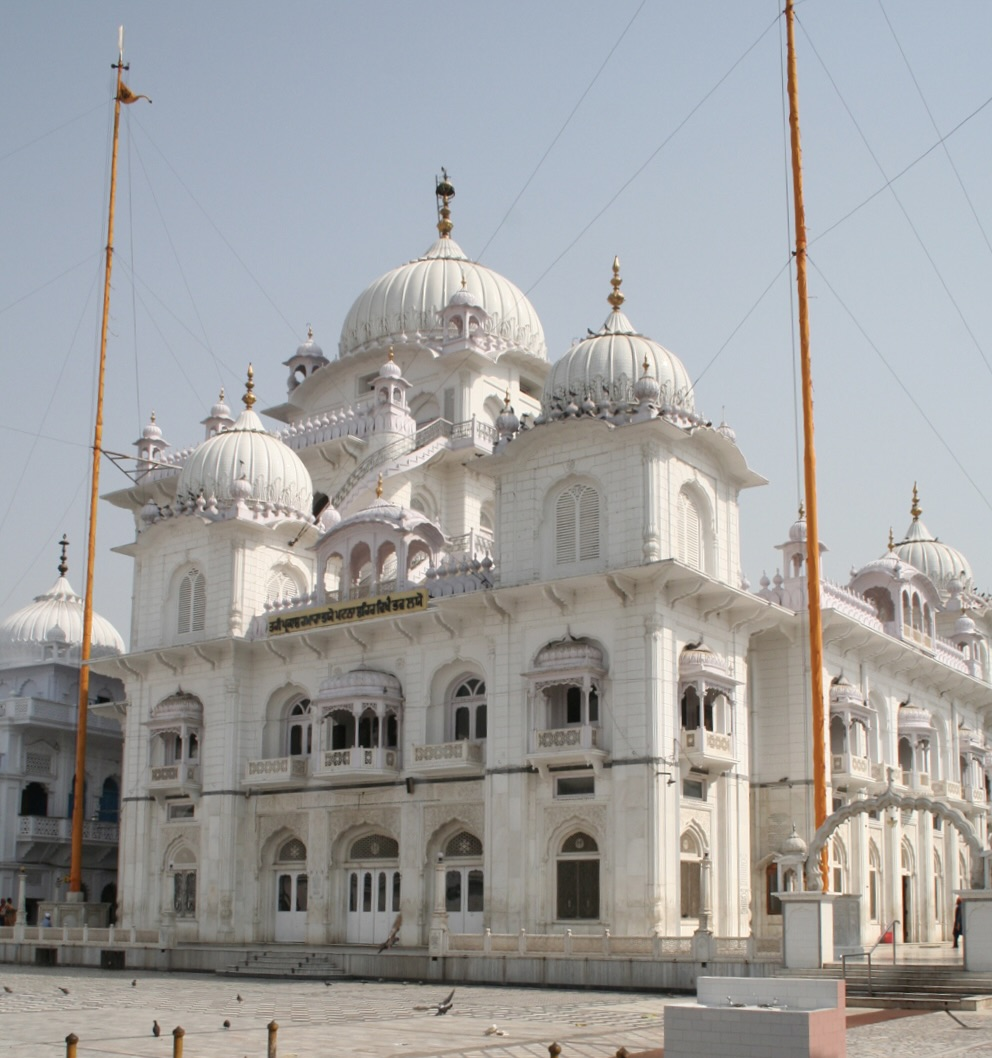
Main shrine

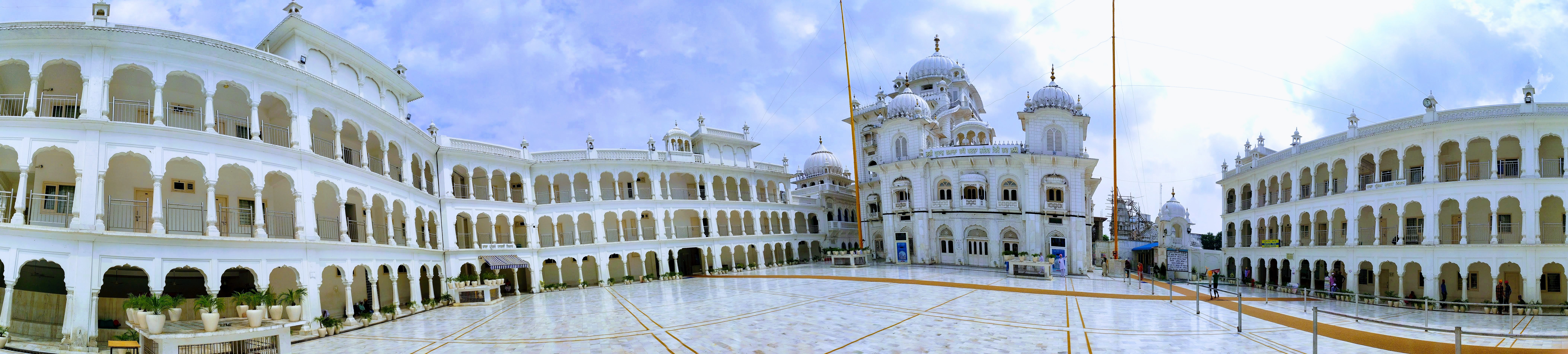
Panorama view of the complex

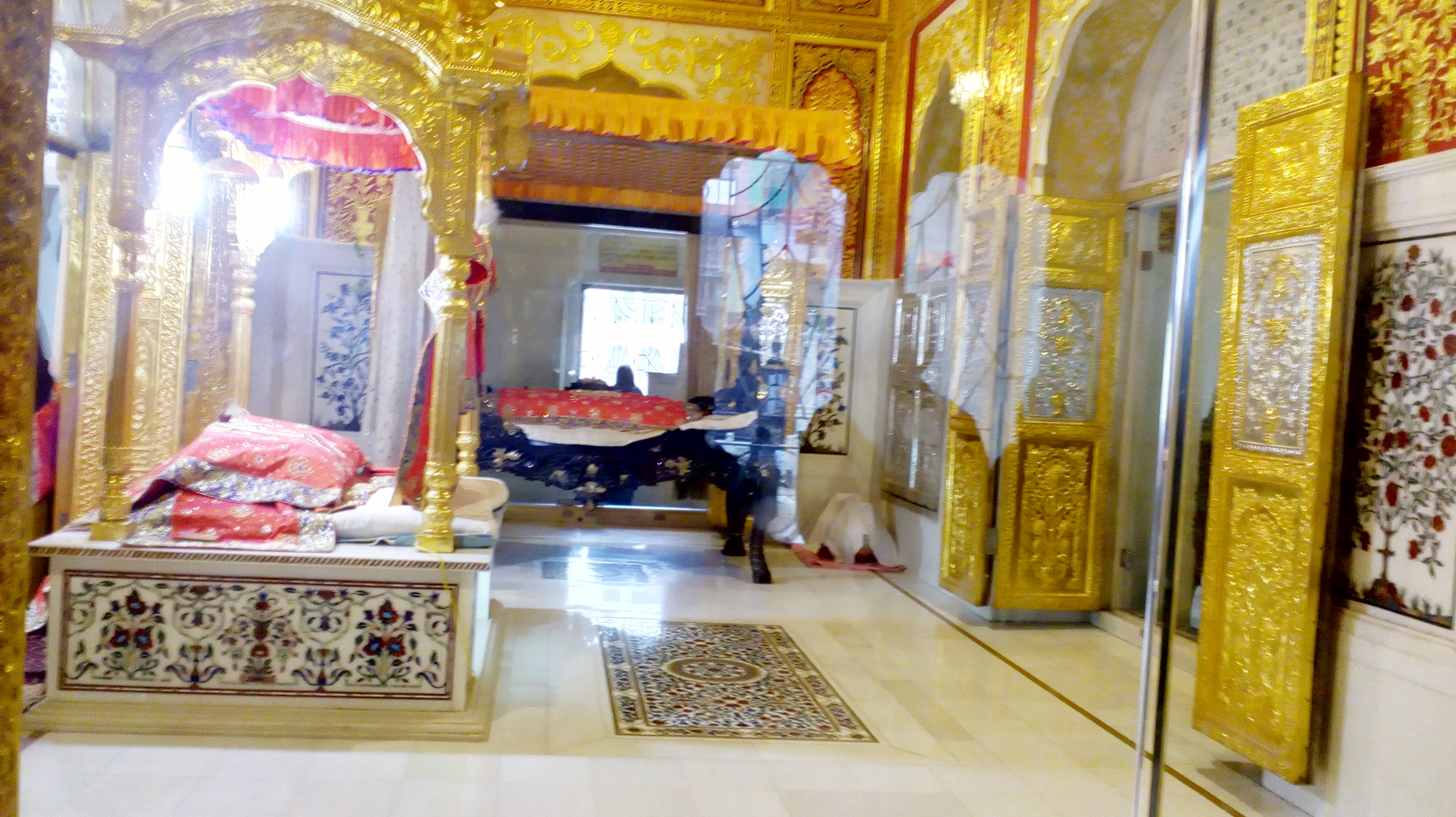
Interior view

== See also ==
- Gurdwara Handi Sahib
- 350th Prakash Parv
