= Exhibition Road, Patna =

Exhibition Road Braj Kishore Path
- Street, Neighbourhood and Business Districts
- Location in Patna, India
- Coordinates: 25°36′42.2″N 85°08′33.5″E
- Country: India
- State: Bihar
- Metro: Patna

Languages
  - Spoken: Hindi, English, Magadhi
- Time zone: UTC+5:30 (IST)
- PIN: 800001
- Planning agency: Patna Regional Development Authority
- Civic agency: Patna Municipal Corporation

Exhibition Road (officially Braj Kishore Path) is one of the most important thoroughfares and Central business district in Patna, Bihar, India. It is a commercial center located in the heart of the city. It connects Gandhi Maidan Marg with the Chiraiyatand Flyover. It runs in parallel to the Frazer Road, east to the New Dak Bungalow.

== Overview/Transport ==
Exhibition road is about 1 km away from Patna Junction railway station and 3.5 km from Patna Airport. It is one of the most prominent commercial hub of Patna and is host of number of Hotels in Patna. Exhibition road has residential apartments too. The famous car accessories market of Patna too is located on Exhibition road. Gandhi Maidan Police Station of Patna Police serve this area.

== Major landmarks ==
- CDA Patna Building (Rajendra Path)
- LIC Building
- Big Bazaar (P Mall)
- Ashiana Towers
- Chevrolet Showroom
- Pizza Hut
- Standard Chartered Bank
- Hotel gargee grand
- Domino's Pizza
- Patliputra exotica
- Indian Summer Cafe
- Bindabashini Bhawan
- PREMA Honda

== Nearby schools ==
- St. Xavier's High School, Patna
- EDUscope Multi Activity centre, Patna
- Christ Church Diocesan School, Patna
- Bankipore Girls' High School
- St. Joseph's Convent High School Patna
- List of central business districts in India

== See also ==
- Frazer Road
