= Gandhi Maidan Marg =

Historical place and landmark in Patna, Bihar

Gandhi Maidan Marg(Bankipore Maidan Marg) Gandhi Maidan(Bankipore Maidan)
- Neighbourhood
- Location in Patna, India
- Coordinates: 25°37′2″N 85°8′42″E
- Country: India
- State: Bihar
- Metro: Patna

Languages
  - Official: Hindi
- Time zone: UTC+5:30 (IST)
- PIN: 800001
- Planning agency: Patna Regional Development Authority
- Civic agency: Patna Municipal Corporation

Gandhi Maidan or Gandhi Maidan Marg (Bankipore Maidan) is one of the most important thoroughfares in Patna, India. It is a historical place and is considered as a landmark of the city. Gandhi Maidan is the main market and commercial area of Patna with Ashok Rajpath which starts from Gandhi Maidan and Dak Bungalow Crossing and Bailey Road besides Frazer Road, Exhibition Road, Boring Road, and Boring Canal Road. There are many important institutes that have developed around the area of Gandhi Maidan.

== Landmarks around Gandhi Maidan ==
The Gandhi Maidan lies in the hub of the city of Patna. There are many places around the sprawling grounds that one can visit. Within a distance of half a kilometer lies the granary of Golghar that was built in 1786 by the British. The Golghar Falls is also located there. The Patna Sahib Gurudwara is 11 km away from Gandhi Maidan. There are many educational institutes that developed in this region. Some of the schools and colleges near Gandhi Maidan are:

- A. N. Sinha Institute for Social Studies
- St. Xavier's High School
- Women's Training College affiliated under the Patna University
- Magadh Mahila College

Owing to the central location of the grounds, many hotels and office buildings are stationed around it. One of the most important office building is the Biscoman Bhavan which houses offices of the Nalanda Open University and the East Central Railway of Patna.

The Gandhi Maidan is an important landmark of Patna and has its own historical, economic and political value.

=== North ===
- Shri Krishna Memorial Hall
- Christ Church Diocesan School, Patna
- Kargil Chowk
- Gandhi Sangrahalaya
- Patna International Convention Centre

=== East ===
- Mona Multiplex
- NIFT Patna
- Regent theatre
- Gandhi Maidan Police Station (Bihar Police HQ)
- Udyog Bhawan

National Institute of Fashion Technology, Patna

=== West ===
- Biscomaun Bhawan
- Srikrishna Science Centre
- St. Xavier's High School, Patna
- State Bank of India, Building
- Nalanda Open University
- Shahid Pir Ali Park

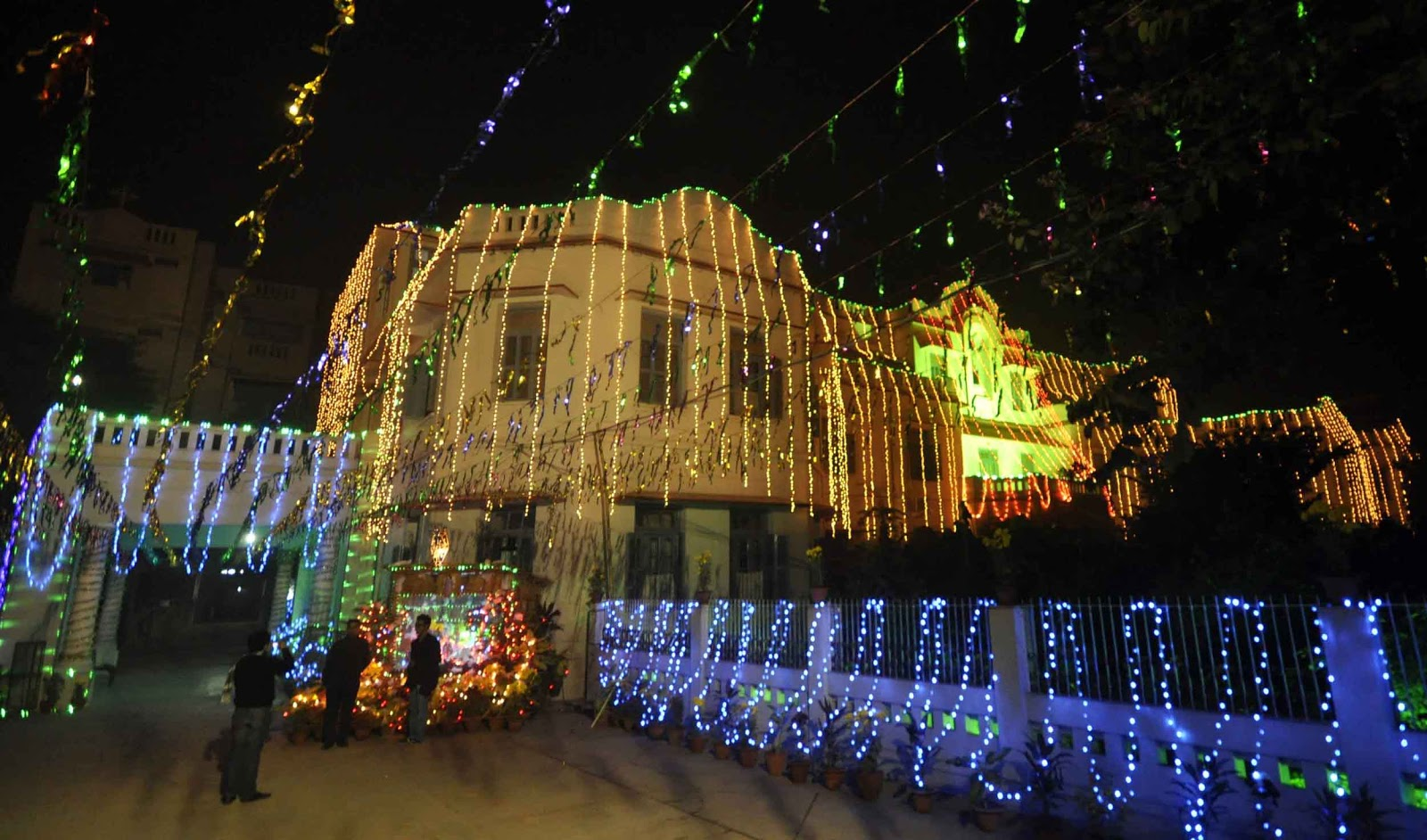
Fully decorated with coloured electric bulbs, St Xavier's School celebrated Christmas in Patna on 24 December 2012.

=== South ===
- Twin Towers
- Reserve Bank of India, Patna
- Maurya Lok

=== South-East ===
- Kalidas Rangalaya

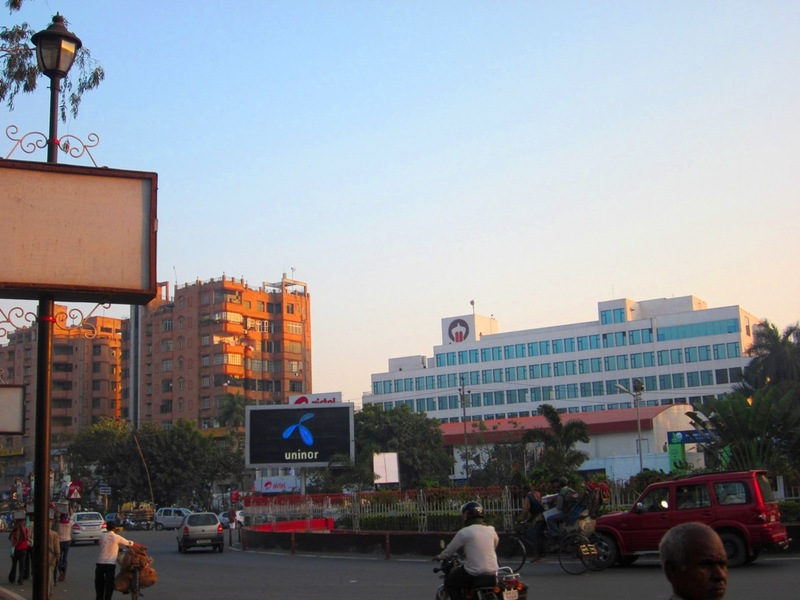
Maurya lok and twin towers, South Gandhi Maidan Marg

== See also ==
- Gandhi Maidan
