= Sabhyata Dwar =

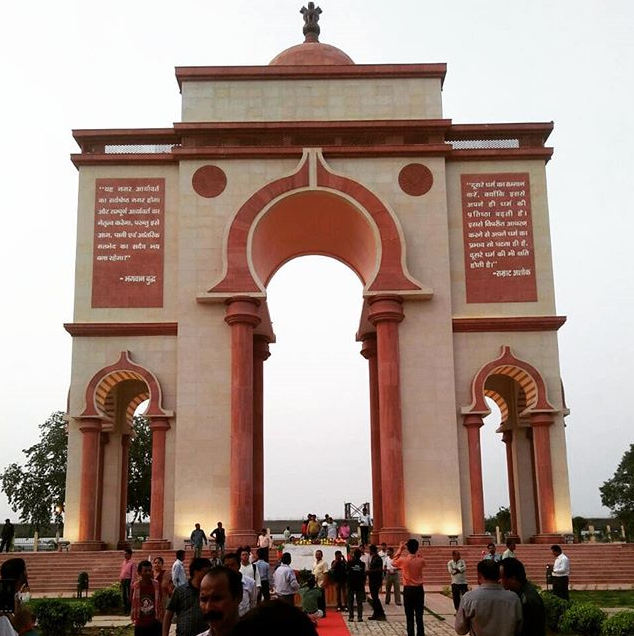
- Sabhyata Dwar

- Location within Patna Sabhyata Dwar (Bihar) Sabhyata Dwar (India)
- Alternative names: Civilization Gate

General information
- Type: Triumphal arch
- Architectural style: Indo-Saracenic
- Location: Patna, Bihar, Samrat Ashok International Convention Centre, Gandhi Maidan
- Coordinates: 25.621935°N 85.143886°E
- Elevation: 10 m (33 ft)
- Construction started: 20 May 2016
- Completed: May 2018
- Inaugurated: 21 May 2018
- Cost: ₹ 5 crore (50 million) (2018)
- Owner: Government of Bihar

Height
- Height: 32 m (105 ft)

Dimensions
- Diameter: 15 metres (49 feet)

The Sabhyata Dwar or Civilization Gate is a sandstone arch monument located on the banks on River Ganga in the city of Patna in the Indian state of Bihar. The Sabhyata Dwar is built with a Mauryan-style architecture with a purpose to show the ancient glory of Pataliputra and traditions and culture of the state of Bihar. The monument was first envisioned by the former Lieutenant General Srinivas Kumar Sinha. The 32 metres (105 ft) high structure is taller than Gateway of India by 6 metres (20 ft) and was built at a cost of ₹ 5 crore (50 million). The monument is spread over an area of one acre within the campus of Samrat Ashok International Convention Centre. The arches of the Dwar contain inscriptions attributed to Megasthenes, Ashoka, Buddha and Mahavira. Bihar Chief Minister Nitish Kumar inaugurated the monument on 21 May 2018.

== History ==
The idea for constructing a Gateway of India like structure was pitched by the former Jammu and Kashmir Governor Retired Lieutenant General Srinivas Kumar Sinha (SK Sinha) in 2010. SK Sinha suggested the idea to build a Sabhyata Dwar (Civilisation Gate) near the residence of City Superintendent of Police on the banks of River Ganga to show how the river port of Pataliputra attracted people from across the world.

== Construction ==
On 8 February 2014, foundation stone of Samrat Ashok International Convention Centre was laid by the then Chief Minister of Bihar Nitish Kumar of which the Sabhyata Dwar was a part of. The plan of the building was drawn by a Delhi based firm. Construction of the monument was done by the building and construction department of the Bihar government. On 21 May 2018, Sabhyata Dwar was inaugurated by the Bihar Chief Minister Nitish Kumar. The cost of construction of the project is ₹ 5 crore (50 million).

== Structure and appearance ==
The Sabhyata Dwar is built on an area of one acre within the campus of Samrat Ashok International Convention Centre, north of Gandhi Maidan. At 32 metres (105 ft) high the structure is taller than Gateway of India (26 metres (85 ft)) and Golghar (29 metres (95 ft)). The Dwar faces Ganga on its northern side. It consists of two arches built with Mauryan architecture with a smaller arch on either side. The structure is constructed from red and white sandstones. Atop the arch monument is a small stupa upon which rests Ashoka's four-sided lion capital made from alloyed metal. The northern and southern faces of the arches contain inscriptions attributed to Megasthenes, Ashoka, Buddha and Mahavira.

== See also ==
- Bihar Museum
- Kargil Chowk
- Shaheed Smarak Patna
- Buddha Smriti Park
- India Gate
