= Rabindra Parishad =

Building in India

- रबिन्द्र परिषद
- Address: Beer Chand Patel Path, Patna - 800001; India
- Capacity: 1000 seats (Ravindra Bhavan)

Construction
- Opened: 1948

Website
- rabindraparishadpatna.org

The Rabindra Parishad is a multi-purpose cultural centre on Beer Chand Patel Path in Patna, India.

== Overview ==
Named after Rabindranath Tagore, it was established in 1948. The building contains a musical school (known as Geet Bhawan), a library with books on and by Tagore, and an auditorium, known as Rabindra Bhavan, which is an important theater in Patna where cultural and theatrical activities takes place. The programme of performances ranges from theatre, to live music, comedy, dance, visual art, spoken word and children's events.

During 2008 to 2010, the theater went a major renovation and suspension. The overall renovation cost was estimated about ₹1.5 crore. After renovation, the auditorium's seating capacity was increased from 655 to 1,000 and the theater’s structure were improved, too. In February 2011, the state-of-the-art auditorium was inaugurated by the Chief Minister of Bihar, Nitish Kumar.

== See also ==
- Kalidas Rangalaya
- Bhartiya Nritya Kala Mandir
- Premchand Rangshala
