= Amrik Singh Nimbran =

Indian police officer

- Born: 22 November 1955 (age 70); Kaithal, Haryana
- Education: B.A.
- Police career
- Department: Bihar Police
- Service years: 1979–2014
- Status: Retired

State Security Advisor of Bihar
- Incumbent
- Assumed office 6 Dec 2014
- Preceded by: Post Created

Director General of Police of Bihar (Fire Service & Home Guard)
- In office 14 February 2013 – 1 March 2014

Inspector General of Police of Patna Zone
- In office 2012–2013

Amrik Singh Nimbran, retired Indian Police Service officer and amateur mathematician.

== Personal life ==
Amrik Singh Nimran was born into a Dalit family at Gurgaon, Haryana.

In 1992, he wrote Poverty, Land, and Violence: An Analytical Study of Naxalism in Bihar.

== Civil services ==
Nimbran is a 1979-batch Indian Police Service officer of Bihar cadre.

He is the only IPS officer who has held every position in Patna. He was SP, Senior SP, DIG Central Range, and I.G. (Patna Zone) and later appointed as DGP of Bihar (Fire Service and Home Guard).

He retired in 2014, after giving 35 years of service to the state.

He is the first State Security Advisor of Bihar and included under Jitan Ram Manjhi's government. Being a Dalit and senior officer, Nimbran was considered Majhi's comrade.

== Mathematics ==
He is an amateur mathematician and his papers have been published in the Indian Journal of Pure and Applied Mathematics and Indian Math Society in 2016 and The Ramanujan Journal in 2018 regarding Generalized Wallis-Euler Products and New Infinite Products for π.

Published "Euler Sums and Integral Connections" in MDPI. He has 64 publications on mathematics and he is mainly contributing in arc tangent identities, infinite series and infinite products for computing Pi.
