= Patliputra Natya Mahotsav =

Annual theatre festival in Patna, India

Patliputra Natya Mahotsav पाटलिपुत्र नाट्य महोत्सव
- logo
- Status: active
- Genre: Drama
- Frequency: Annually
- Venue: Kalidas Rangalaya
- Locations: Patna, Bihar
- Country: India
- Inaugurated: 1985
- Founder: Abhay Sinha
- Most recent: 2-6 February 2023
- Next event: 2024
- Participants: 24 theatre groups from 14 Indian states and Bangladesh
- People: Soma Chakraborty
- Member: Anil kumar Verma

Patliputra Natya Mahotsav (PNM), started in 1985, is an annual theatre festival organized in the Patna, India by the Prangan, a Cultural Organization, with the help of Union and state ministries of culture. held annually (usually in the February or march) at the Kalidas Rangalaya. The first Patliputra Natya Mahotsav was held in 1985 and 2023 was its 37th edition.

== See also ==
- Rajgir Mahotsav
- Sonepur Cattle Fair
- Patna Sahib Mahotsav
