= Patna Sahib Mahotsav =

Patna Sahib Mahotsav पटना साहिब महोत्सव ਪਟਨਾ ਸਾਹਿਬ ਮਹੋਤਸਵ
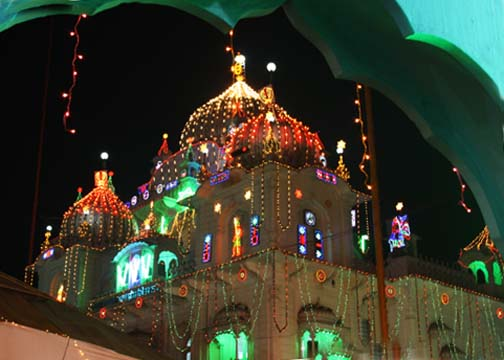
- Patna Sahib during Prakash Utsav
- Status: active
- Genre: festivals
- Venue: Mangal Talab (2008-13); S K Memorial Hall (2014)
- Locations: Patna Sahib, Patna, Bihar
- Country: India
- Inaugurated: 2008
- Founder: Nitish Kumar
- Most recent: 30–31 May 2014
- Next event: 2015
- Website: patna.bih.nic.in/Mahotsav/patnasahibmahotsav.htm

Patna Sahib Mahotsav (festival), is an annual two-day cultural event at Patna, India. It is organized by the Tourism Department of Government of Bihar, is usually celebrated around Baisakhi near Takht Sri Patna Sahib, the birthplace of tenth Sikh Guru, Guru Gobind Singh.

== Overview ==
The first edition of mahotsav was started in 2008 at the Mangal Talab of the Manoj Kamalia Stadium, on the eve of Baisakhi. Since then, it is an annual event in the calendar of Bihar Government. However, in 2009, the event was not celebrated due to 2009 Indian general election. In 2014, it was rescheduled again due to 2014 Indian general election, after which it was held on 30–31 May and for the first time it was held at Shri Krishna Memorial Hall.

== See also ==
- Patliputra Natya Mahotsav
- Rajgir Mahotsav
- Sonepur Cattle Fair
