= Kakila, Nalanda =

Kakila is one of the villages located in the Nalanda district. It is located 3 km east of the ancient village, Baragaon. Nearby is a small market in Mirchaiganj.
