= Boring Road =

Boring Road Jai Prakash Narayan Path
- Neighbourhood/Street
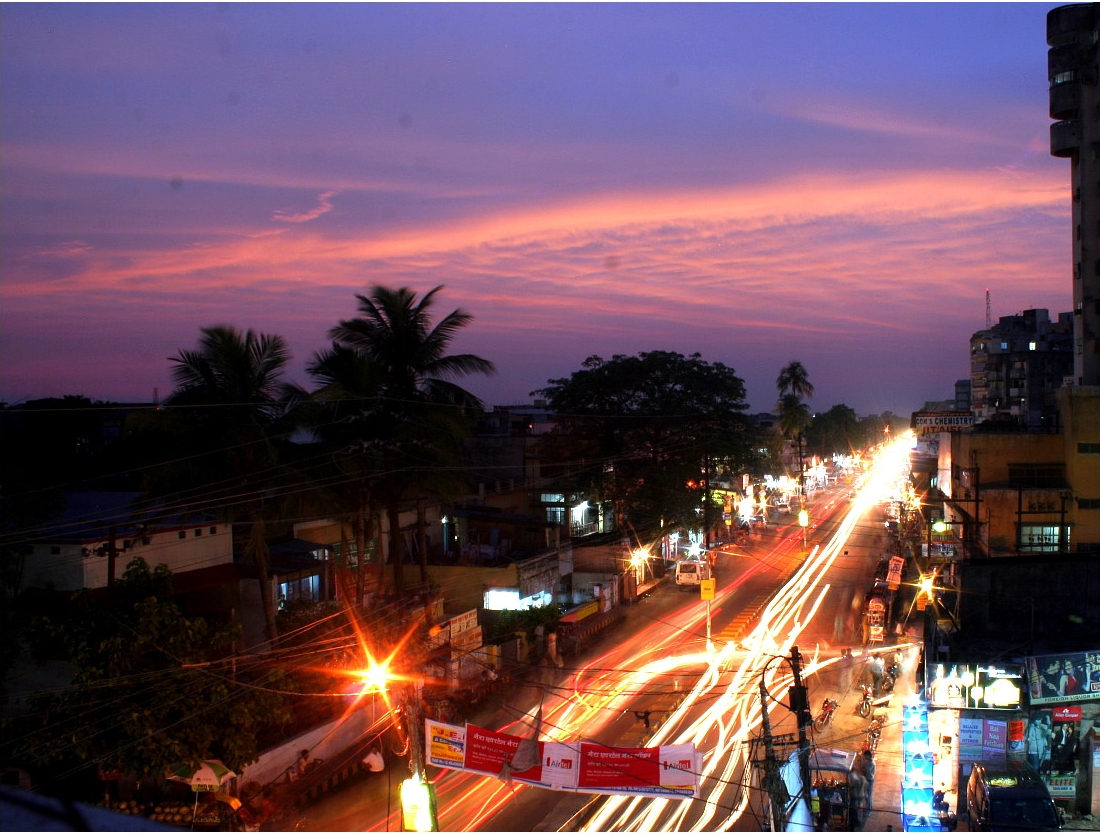
- Nightscape of Boring road

- Location in Patna, India
- Coordinates: 25°36′54″N 85°6′55″E
- Country: India
- State: Bihar
- Metro: Patna

Languages
  - Spoken: Hindi, English
- Time zone: UTC+5:30 (IST)
- PIN: 800001
- Planning agency: Patna Regional Development Authority
- Civic agency: Patna Municipal Corporation

Boring Road (officially Jai Prakash Narayan Path), is an area in Patna, India. It encompasses the majority of residence of retired IAS and IPS services officers along with several Head Branches of show Rooms and business entities. It starts from the corner of Patna Women's College as an intersection to Bailey Road near Patna High Court. It ends at the end of A N College or the famous Pani Tanki. Almost 2 km in Length, Boring Road serves a number of colonies on left and right. Nageshwar Colony, Sri Krishna Puri, North Sri Krishna Puri are the main colonies of Patna situated adjacent to Boring Road.

Recently Bihar state government has planned to divide boring road into two phase. The right way pointing towards bailey road towards boring road chauraha would be named as phase 1, whereas from hartali more towards boring road would be named as phase 2

It is VVIP area, most of big coaching centre are situated there. It is a working-class neighbourhood geographically located in the Northern part of city of Patna. Formerly the centre of the banking industry in Patna it has become progressively dominated by expensive shops. Boring Road (along with Frazer Road) is considered Patna's most upmarket shopping area. It is one of the well known commercial area of the city. PIN code include 800001, the area is patrolled by the Sri Krishna Puri PS of Patna Police.

== History ==
Originally a residential street, it became the site of many British government officials' houses and large office buildings during the early 20th century. Most of these have since been demolished but some have been converted to other uses. The streets in the neighbourhood were laid in the mid-1980s and by the late 20th century Boring Road was the centre of the fashionable residential part of town.

== Overview ==
Boring Road is a vital commercial and residential area of the city. It is almost 3 km away from Patna railway station and the same distance from Patna Airport. Boring Road has emerged as one of the favorite commercial destination in Patna. From corporate offices to retail shops, restaurants and eateries, number of car showrooms (Hyundai, Maruti Suzuki and Honda) doctors and diagnostic clinics and much more it engulfs on both side. The demarcation between residential and commercial properties on this road of Patna has become non existent. Boring road is flagged by numerous commercial cum residential apartments. Boring road is also another educational Hub of Patna with Patna Women's College and A N College at its two ends. A number of cram schools and schools are spread all over Boring Road.Many new coaching institutes for IITs have opened in Boring Canal Road.

== Landmarks and nearby places ==
- A N College
- Vasundhara Metro Mall
- Reliance Trends
- Orchid Mall
- Shivpuri
- Satyendra Narayan Sinha Park, S K Puri ~0.2 km
- Anand puri colony ~0.5 km
- Pronotical ~0.5 km
- Rai Jee Gali ~0.7 km
- Mount Carmel High School, Patna ~0.8 km

== Problems ==
With so many facilities spread only within 2 km, the area is densely populated. Heavy traffic is witnessed always at Boring Road square.

== Gallery ==
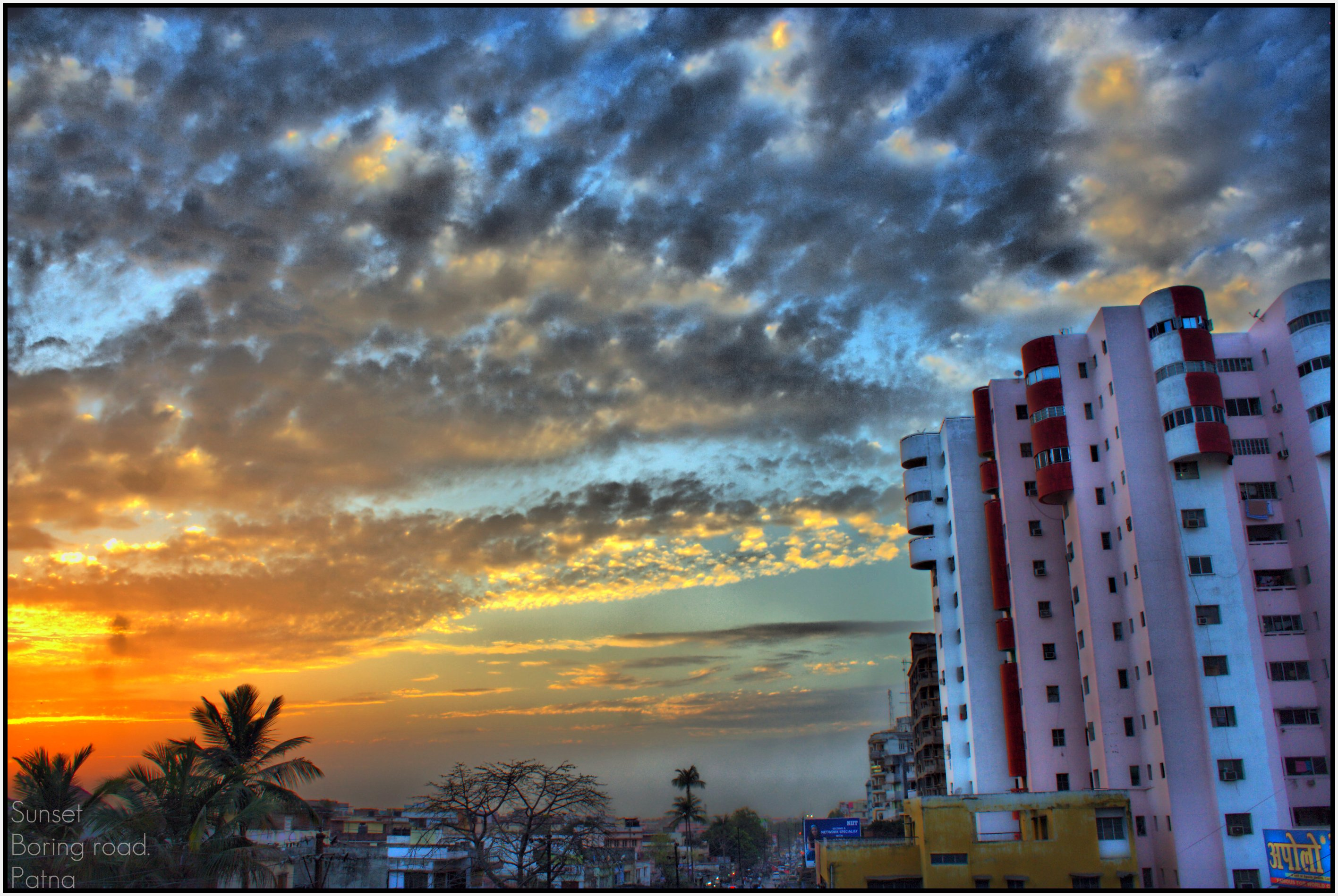
Boring road ~ Chandan Singh

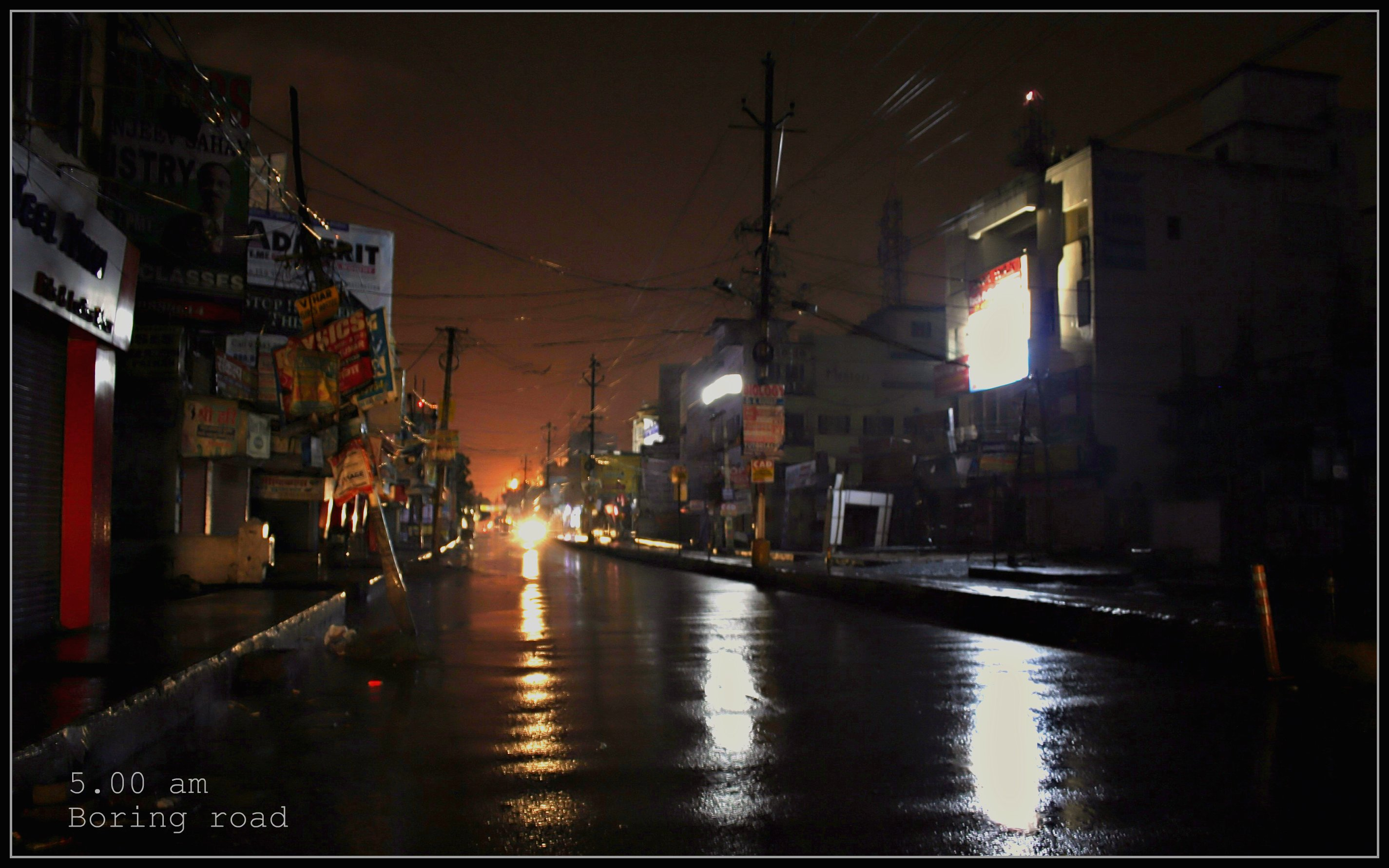
Nightscapes ~ Chandan Singh

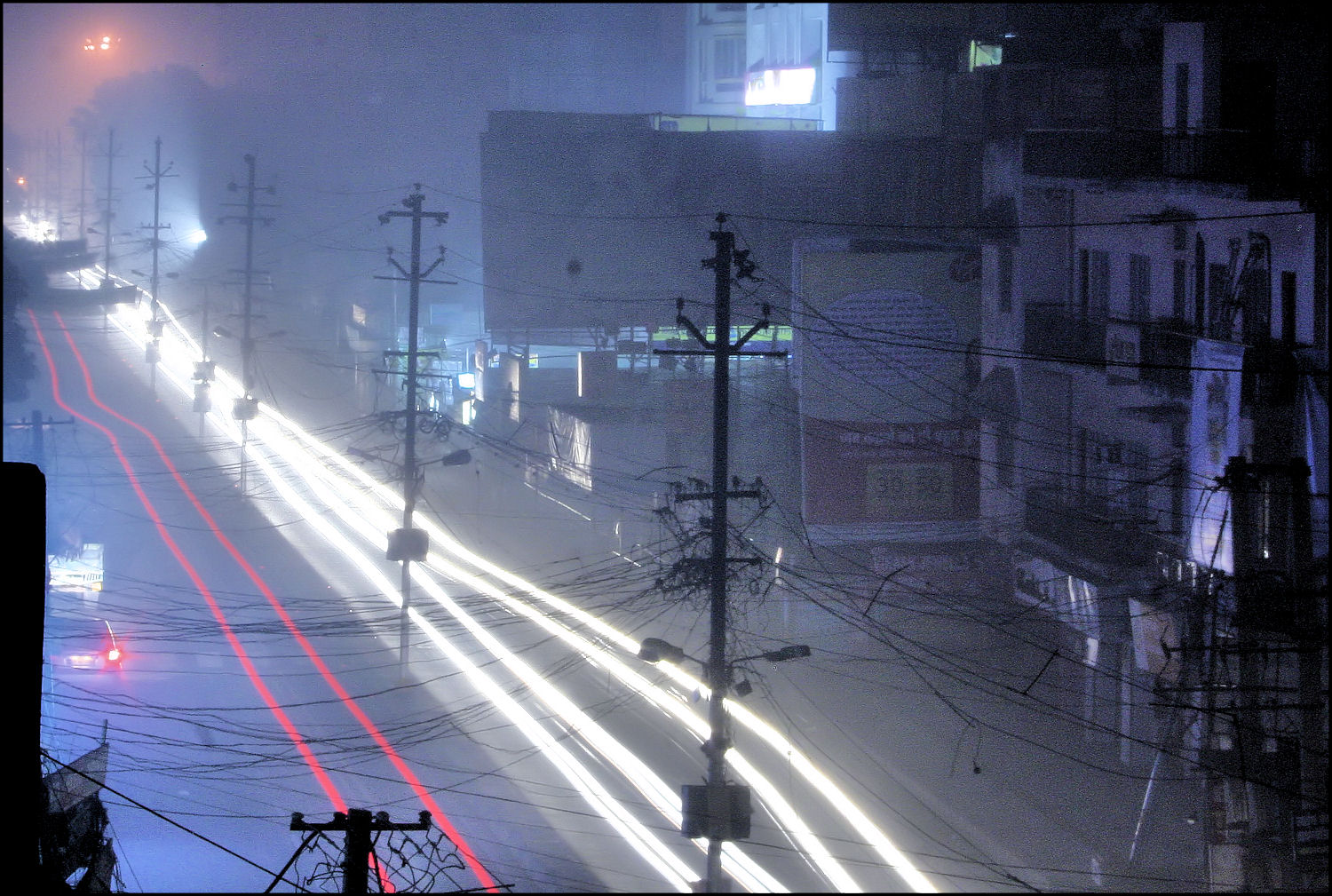
Night view

== See also ==
- Frazer Road
- Bailey Road, Patna
