= The Mall, Patna =

- Patna Centro Mall
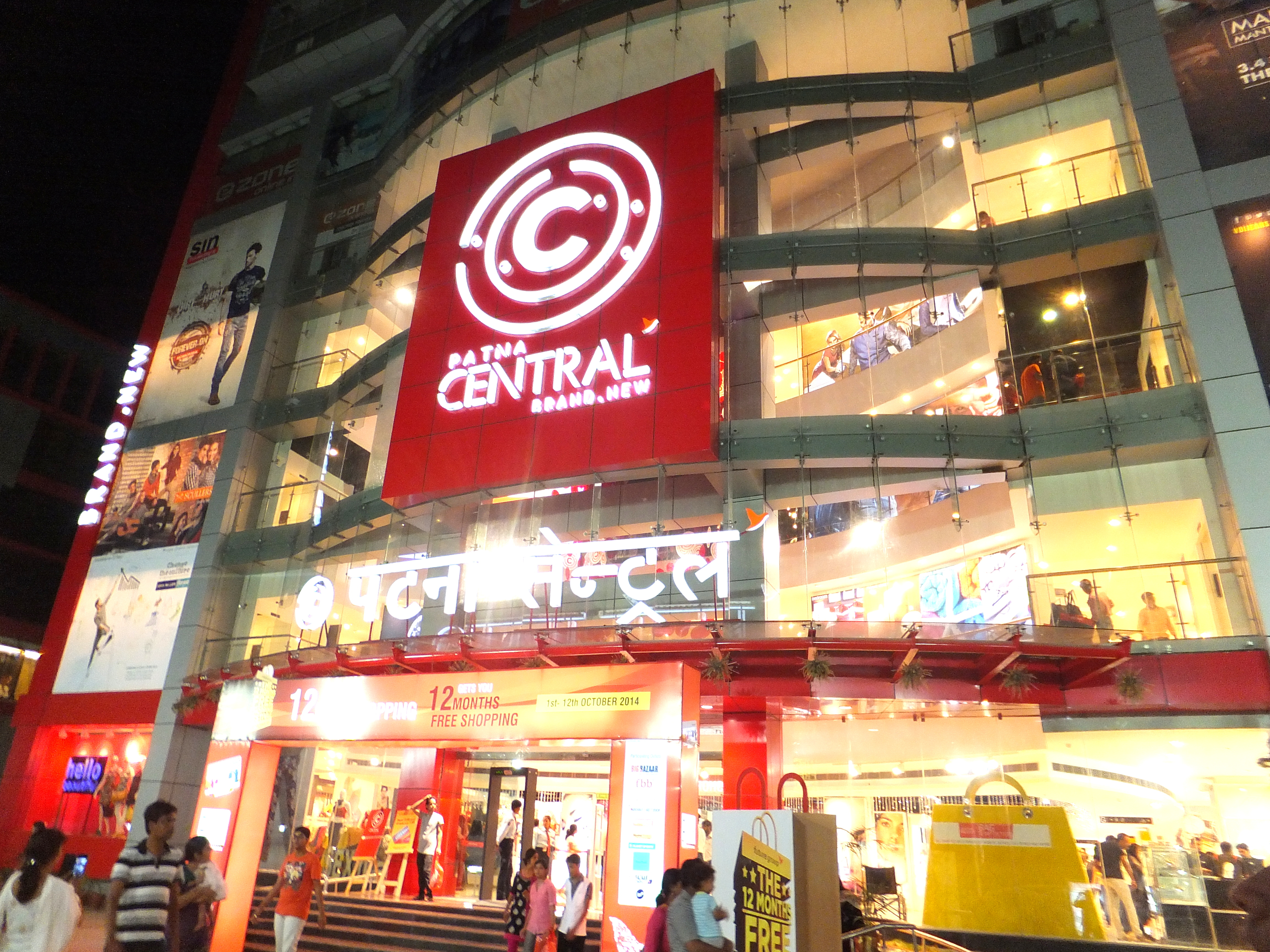
- Location: Frazer Road; Patna, Bihar, India
- Opened: 2010
- Num. of stores: 260
- Floor area: 110,000 sq ft (10,000 m^{2})
- Floors: G+6
- Parking: 200 cars

Patna Centro Mall is a shopping mall in Patna, Bihar. It houses retail spaces, including a Central (Hypermarket), departmental store, multiplex, entertainment zone, food court, restaurants, gym, banquet halls, and shops.

The mall is located at Frazer Road, Patna. In November 2014, illegally constructed parts of the building were sealed by Patna district administration after the court ordered termination of all activities in the illegal parts.
