= Shilpi-Gautam Murder =

Controversial double suicide case

- Date: 3 July 1999
- Time: ~ late night / early hours (exact time uncertain)
- Location: Frazer Road, Patna, India
- Also known as: Shilpi Jain Murder Case; Fraser Road Double Murder; Bungalow No.12 Murder
- Type: Unsolved death, Alleged double murder
- Theme: Political cover-up, Violence against women
- Motive: Alleged sexual exploitation; political suppression
- Injuries: Evidence of sexual assault (multiple rapes alleged)
- Inquiries: CBI investigation, Bihar Police preliminary inquiry
- Inquest: Postmortem revealed poisoning and rape
- Arrests: Birendra Prakash Singh, Dipak Singh (later released)
- Suspects: Sadhu Yadav
- Trial: No formal trial; case closed as suicide
- Verdict: Double suicide (as per CBI)
- Remains controversial; multiple appeals for reinvestigation citing political interference and unanswered questions.

The Shilpi-Gautam murder is the infamous case of death of two individuals, Shilpi Jain and Gautam Singh, which shook the Bihar government of the time. The case was finally closed as double suicide, although many remain unconvinced with the investigation. Shilpi was the daughter of Ujjwal Kumar Jain, a clothes store (Kamla Stores) owner and Gautam was the son of a London based doctor, B.N Singh. He was associated with the youth wing of Rashtriya Janata Dal. The two were believed to be in a relationship.

== Discovery of bodies ==
On 3 July 1999 two bodies of a boy and a girl were discovered in a semi nude state inside a car in a parking near quarter number 12, Frazer Road, Patna. This quarter belonged to Sadhu Yadav, the brother-in-law of Lalu Prasad Yadav and a Member of Legislative Council for the ruling party RJD.The bodies were identified as Shilpi and Gautam. Both of them were missing since 2 July 1999.

== Police investigation ==
The police investigation and handling in this case came under serious questioning. Even before the police could secure the crime scene, the supporters of the MLC reached the scene and created a lot of ruckus. Even the vehicle was driven to the police station by a constable instead of being towed, which rendered getting any fingerprint information from the steering wheel impossible. Police initially declared this a case of suicide even before the Viscera report. Then later they reported possibility of poisoning. The body of Gautam was cremated in a hurry without taking permission from his family members. Another inconsistency found in the police report was that the garage was locked from inside and the key was missing, so the person who called police must have been aware of the bodies.

== CBI investigation ==
Six days after the discovery of bodies, Shilpi's family came forward and claimed it was a murder and not suicide. There was also huge political uproar over the case due to involvement of political personalities. All this combined with the botched up investigation done by police till then, the state government was forced to hand over the case to Central Bureau of Investigation. The CBI sent off the vaginal fluid of Shilpi for DNA testing in Hyderabad. The test report suggested that multiple people had raped Shilpi before her death. The CBI asked for the DNA sample of a MLC, who refused to provide the sample. It is believed that the MLC who refused was Sadhu Yadav. Four years later, CBI close the case. In its report submitted to the court, CBI declared it to be a case of suicide.

Although the parents of Shilpi rejected the CBI report and still feel it to be a case of Murder and want a fresh investigation to be done. Recently Prashant Jain, the brother of Shilpi Jain was kidnapped from outside his home and later freed.
