= Premchand Rangashala =

Theater located in Patna, Bihar, India

Premchand Rangshala
- प्रेमचंद रंगशाला
- Address: Rajendra Nagar, Patna - 800016; India
- Capacity: 600

Construction
- Opened: 1971
- Rebuilt: 2012

The Premchand Rangashala is a theater located in Patna, Bihar, India. It is situated in Rajendra Nagar.

== History ==
It was set up by Government of Bihar in 1971 and among the biggest theatres in Eastern India. After 1972, no play was staged at the auditorium and in 1974 it was handed over to Central Reserve Police Force. In 1987, the auditorium was freed from CRPF after sustained pressure applied by the cultural activists. Thereafter, plays were staged at regular interval.

In 2011, the theater went a major renovation and suspension. The overall renovation cost was estimated about ₹5.91 crore. By the year 2012, 100 more seats were added as against existing capacity to accommodate 500 and the theater's structure were improved too. After renovation, the state-of-art theatre was inaugurated in February 2012 by the Chief Minister of Bihar, Nitish Kumar.

== See also ==
- Kalidas Rangalaya
- Bhartiya Nritya Kala Mandir
- Rabindra Parishad
