= Nalanda Open University =

Public open university in Patna, Bihar, India

Coordinates: 25.6173°N 85.1412°E

- Motto: पावका नः सरस्वती
- Type: Public
- Established: 1987 (39 years ago)
- Affiliations: UGC
- Chancellor: Governor of Bihar
- Vice-Chancellor: Ravindra Kumar
- Students: Over 1.25 lakh (as of 2018)
- Location: Present location Baragaon, Nalanda near the Ruins of Nalanda ancient university. The earlier location was at the Biscomaun Bhawan, Patna., Bihar, India
- Campus: Urban
- Website: www.nou.ac.in

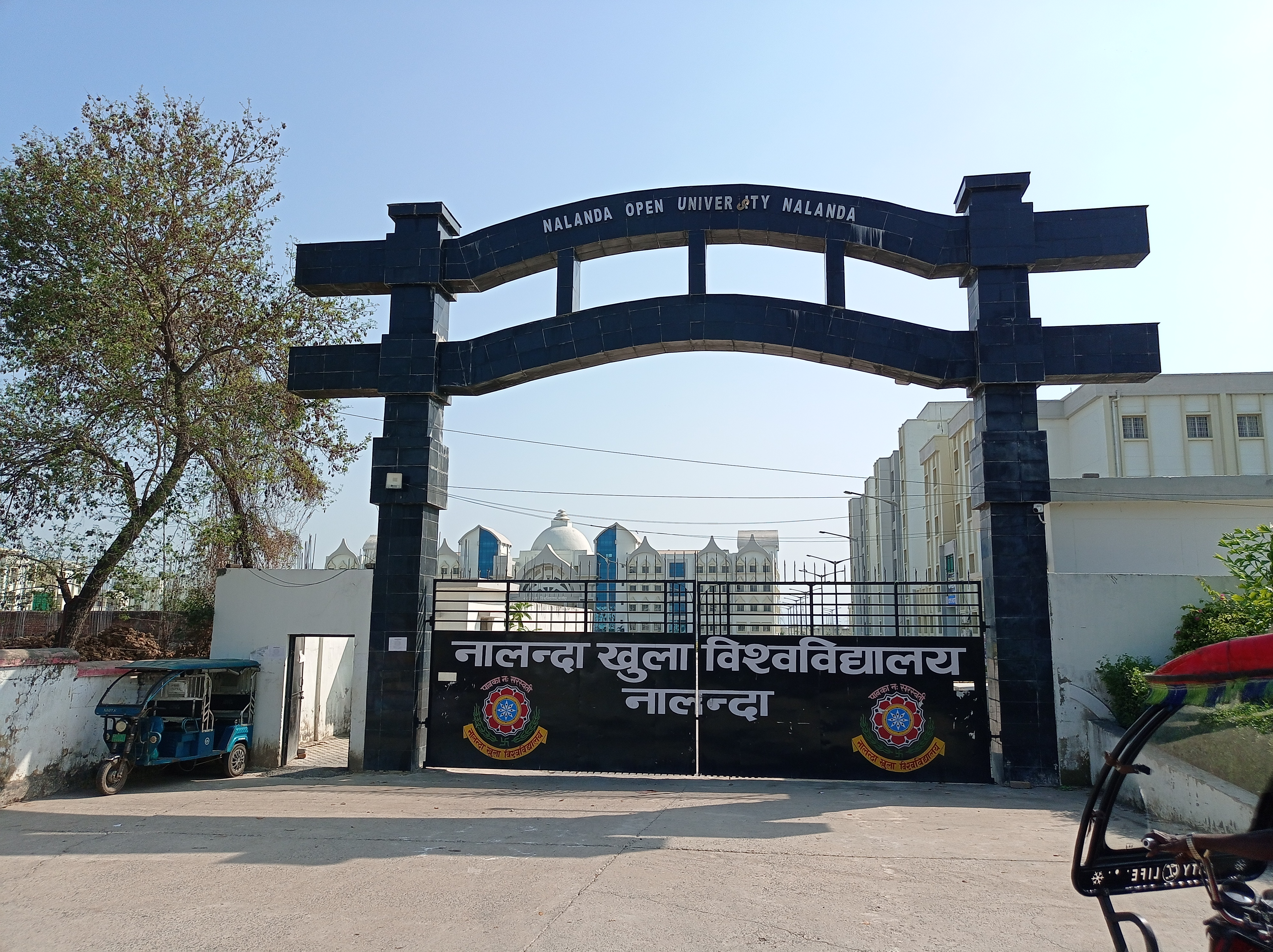
Gate of the new campus of the Nalanda Open University at Baragaon near the ruins of the ancient Nalanda University

Nalanda Open University (NOU) is a university at Patna in Bihar state, India. Nalanda Open University Degree/Diploma /Certificates are eligible for higher studies, public & private sector employment and service promotions. It is recognized by University Grants Commission (UGC). It is a member of Association of Indian Universities which is mainly concerned with the recognition of degrees/diplomas awarded by the Universities in India, which are recognized by the University Grants Commission, New Delhi, and abroad for the purpose of admission to higher degree courses in Indian Universities. It is an open university which means that it follows an open-door academic policy and is open to everyone for admission with minimum requirements.

It is the second largest open university in India after Indira Gandhi National Open University (IGNOU).

Initially the headquarter of the university was functioning from its camp office which is located at Biscomaun Bhawan, 2nd, 3rd, 4th and 12th Floors, Patna-800001. On 29 August 2023 Chief Minister Nitish Kumar inaugurated the newly constructed building of Nalanda Open University built at a cost of Rs 121 crore in Baragaon located in Silav area under Nalanda district. This campus of Nalanda Open University has been built in an area of 10 acres. It is adjacent to the ancient ruins of Nalanda. The campus is expected to be around 40 acres in area, with building having 1.10-lakh square feet built up space, and it is as per the requirement of UGC.

In 2020, it became the first university in the state of Bihar to adopt the University Management Information System (UMIS) and with this, all processes related to admissions, examinations and publication of results has been made online.

== History ==
The university was established in March 1987 by an ordinance issued by the Government of Bihar. It is the only university in the state of Bihar meant for imparting education exclusively through distance education. In 1995, the Nalanda Open University Act was passed by the legislature of Bihar replacing the earlier ordinance, and this university thereafter came under the authority and jurisdiction of the passed act. It is named after the famous Buddhist Nalanda University of Nalanda, the ancient seat of learning.

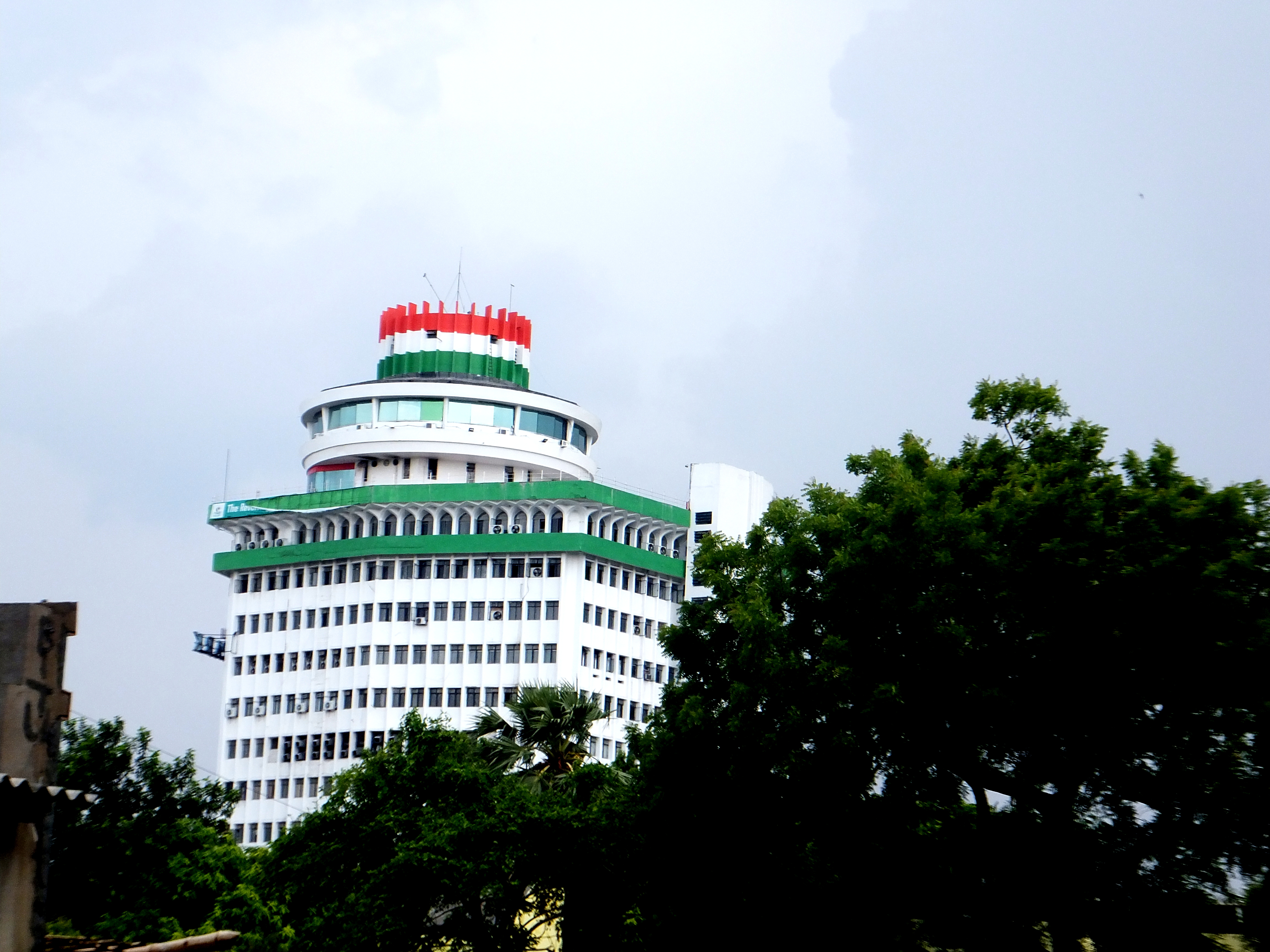
The earlier headquarter of the Nalanda Open University at Biscoman Bhawan, Patna

== Courses ==
Degree courses at the undergraduate level and degree as well as diploma courses at the post-graduate level are offered. Certificate courses for 6 or 9 months are provided. Nalanda Open University is the only university where courses on Bihari languages (Magahi, Bhojpuri, Maithili) are offered.

=== Post-graduate degree programs ===
NOU offers a Master of Arts (M.A) in Magahi, Bhojpuri, Rural Development, Economics, Geography, Hindi, History, Political Science, Psychology, Sociology, Public Administration, Journalism & Mass Communication, Education and Urdu.

The university offers a Master of Science in Geography, Botany, Zoology, Chemistry, Physics and Mathematics. It offers Master of Computer Application (MCA), Master of Library & Information Science (One Year Course), and Master in Commerce (M.Com).

=== Post-graduate diploma programmes ===
The university offers post-graduate diploma programmes in Marketing Management, Financial Management, Journalism and Mass Communication, Yogic Studies and Disaster Management.

=== Graduate or degree programmes ===
The university offers B.A. Honours in Economics, Hindi, History, Political Science, Psychology, Sociology, Social Work, Geography, Tourism, and Home Science.

NOU offers Bachelor of Science (Honours) in Botany, Chemistry, Geography, Mathematics, Physics, Zoology, and Home Science.

It offers Bachelor of Commerce, Bachelor of Library and Information Science (one-year course), and Bachelor of Computer Applications.

=== Intermediate programmes ===
- Intermediate of Art
- Intermediate of Commerce
- Intermediate of Science

=== Certificate programmes ===
The university offers a nine-month certificate programme in Computing, Library Science, Clinical Dental Technique, Dental and Oral Hygiene, ECG Technique, Laboratory Technique, Medical Laboratory Technique, Physiotherapy and Yoga Therapy, and Operation Theatre Assistant.

It offers a six-month programme in the languages of Magahi, Bhojpuri, Maithili, Pali, Prakrit, Sanskrit, Urdu and the fields of Disaster Management, Indian Constitution and Panchayati Raj, Abolition of Child Labour, Bio-fertilizer Production, Buddhist Studies, Jain Studies, Child and Women Rights, Child Psychology and Guidance, Christian Studies, Environment Studies, Floriculture Technology, Health and Environment, Food and Nutrition, HIV and Family Education, Insurance Services, Hindu Studies, Islamic Studies, Sikh Studies, Legal awareness among Women, Medicinal and Aromatic Plant, Nutrition and Child Care and Soil Health Management.

NOU also offers a four-week certification programme in Home Usages of Computers.

== Schools ==
- School of Computer Education and Information Technology
- School of Economics, Commerce and Management
- School of Health and Environmental Science
- School of Indian and Foreign Languages
- School of Indology
- School of Journalism and Mass Communication
- School of Library and Information Science
- School of Pure and Agricultural Sciences
- School of Social Sciences
- School of Teacher's Education

== Recognition ==
NOU is a state open university duly established by an act of legislature of Bihar and is recognised by the Distance Education Council, UGC.

Nalanda Open University Degrees/Diplomas/Certificates are eligible for higher studies, public & private sector employment and service promotions.

== See also ==
- List of universities in India
- Universities and colleges in India
- Education in India
- Education in Bihar
- Distance Education Council
- University Grants Commission (India)
