= Patna Book Fair =

- Status: Active
- Genre: Multi-genre
- Venue: Gandhi Maidan
- Locations: Patna, Bihar
- Country: India
- Inaugurated: 1985
- Attendance: 8,44,000 (Dec 2007)
- Organizer: Centre for Readership Development (CRD India)
- Website: http://www.crdindia.org

Patna Book Fair or Patna Pustak Mela is an annual book fair organized in Patna, India by the Centre for Readership Development (CRD), an NGO, held annually (usually in the middle of November) at the Gandhi Maidan, selling and exhibiting books, printed matter, stationery, printing, compact discs and other multimedia publishing. The First Patna Book Fair was held in 1985 and November 2013 was its 20th edition. During 1999-2002 the venue was shifted to Patliputra colony grounds. Next book fair is going to be organised on 4 February 2017 at Gandhi Maidan. The date was shifted from November due to 350th Prakash Parv.

Representatives from book publishing and multimedia companies from all over India and Foreign publishers from USA, UK, and Singapore come to the Fair. The November 2013 book fair had a total of 1000 stalls, covering around 2.5 lakh square feet area.
