= Hari Uppal =

Indian classical dancer

- Born: September 22, 1926; Manpur, Samastipur, Bihar, India
- Died: 2 January 2011 (aged 84); Kolkata, India
- Resting place: Magra, Nalanda, Bihar, India; 25.1200°N 85.3112°E
- Children: Abhik Uppal; Stella Uppal Subbiah and two other daughters
- Awards: Padma Shri; Sangeet Natak Akademi Award; Tamra Patra
- Website: Official web site

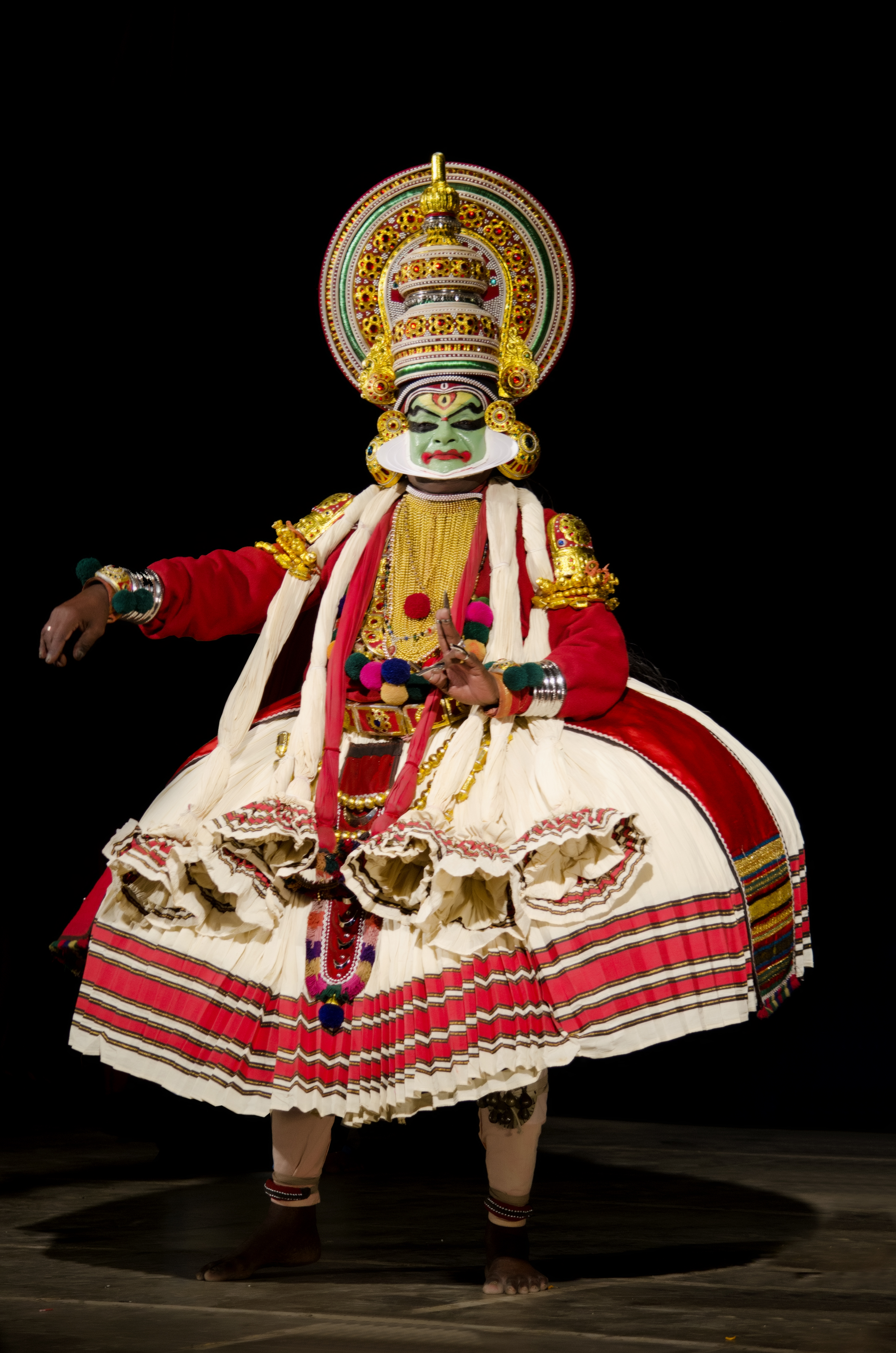
A Kathakali dancer

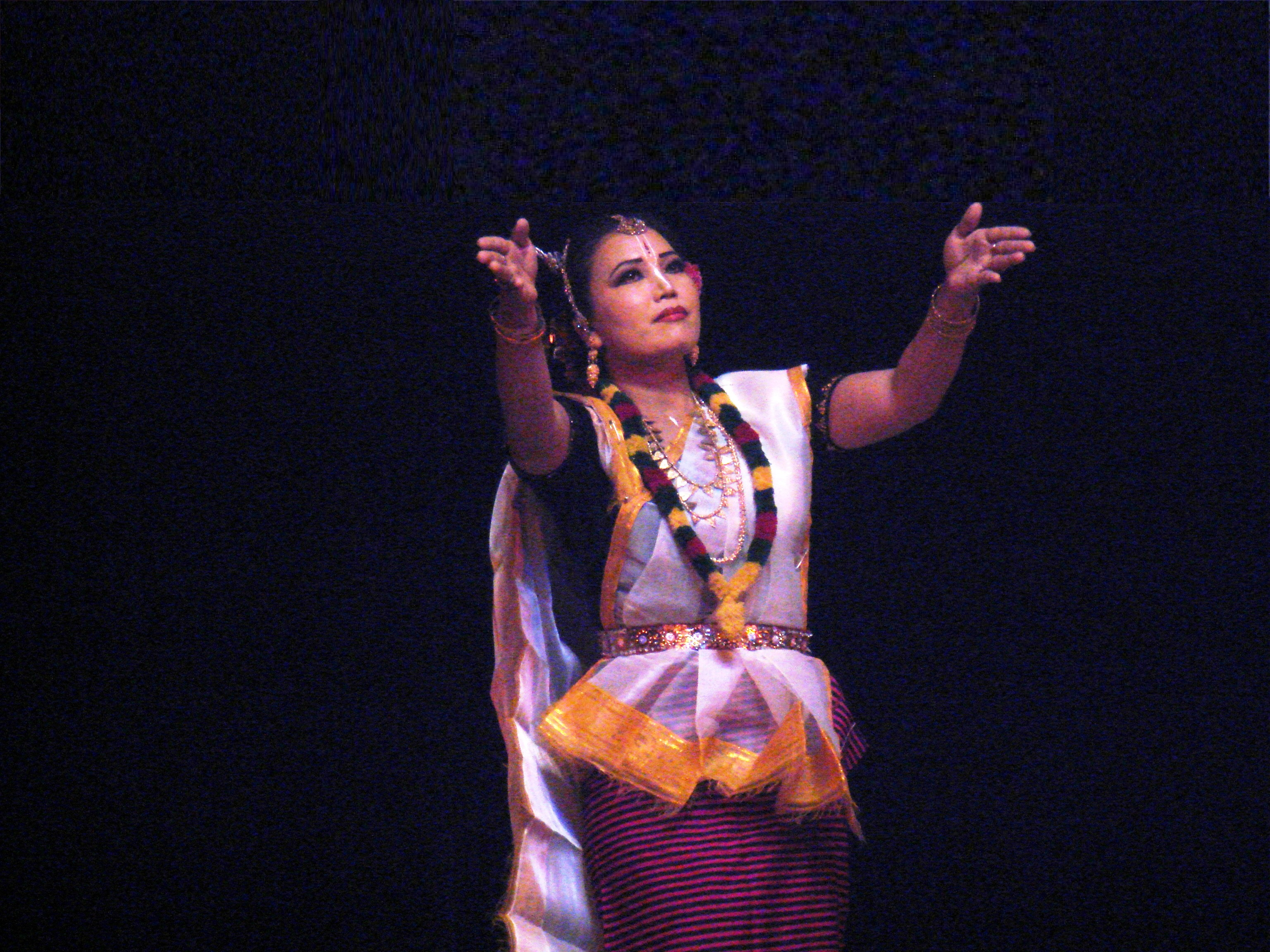
A Manipuri performer

Hari Uppal (1926–2011) was an Indian classical dancer and the founder of a classical dance academy by name, Bhartiya Nritya Kala Mandir, known for his expertise in the dance forms of Kathakali and Manipuri. He was honored by the Government of India, in 2010, with the fourth highest Indian civilian award of Padma Shri.

== Biography ==
Hari Uppal was born on 22 September 1926 in Manpur in Samastipur district in the Indian state of Bihar. He did his schooling at a local school in Patna and graduated from Patna Arts College in Sculpture. Receiving a scholarship, Uppal joined Shantiniketan in 1943, from where he learnt Kathakali and Manipuri dance. The next move was to Kerala Kalamandalam and studied under the tutelage of the renowned Kathakali exponent, Guru Kunchu Kurup and Asan Ramankutty Nair. This was followed by a training stint on Raas Maharas and Basant Raas styles of Manipuri dance under the guidance of Guru Ojha Amubi Singh, in 1949. He has also had a three months training on European Folk dances in Czechoslovakia and Russia, on a scholarship from the Government of India, in 1970.

On 8 December 1950, Uppal started working on his project, Bhartiya Nritya Kala Mandir, a dance academy of modest proportions. The academy, which started in 1963, with a student strength of 8 boys and 10 girls, have grown over the years to include coaching for five Indian classical dance forms and several fork dance forms of Bihar. The academy hosts studios for dance and drama, a gallery and an art museum and has training centres in Patna and Ranchi. It has also gained the status of a Music College since 2011.

Hari Uppal died on 2 January 2011 at a hospital in Kolkata, reportedly due to Cerebral hemorrhage. leaving behind his son, Abhik, and three daughters. Stella Uppal Subbiah, one of his daughters, is an alumnus of Kalakshetra of Rukmini Devi Arundale, and a UK based known exponent of Bharatanatyam. His mortal remains were laid to rest at Uppal House, his residence in Magra in the district of Nalanda, Bihar.

== Awards and recognitions ==
Hari Uppal received the Tamra Patra (Copper Plaque) from the Bihar Nritya Natya Kala Parishad in 1952 and the Sangeet Natak Akademi Award in 2001. The Government of India included him in the 2010 Republic Day honours list, for the civilian award of Padma Shri.

== See also ==
- Kathakali
- Manipuri dance
