= Golghar =

Large granary in Patna, Bihar, India

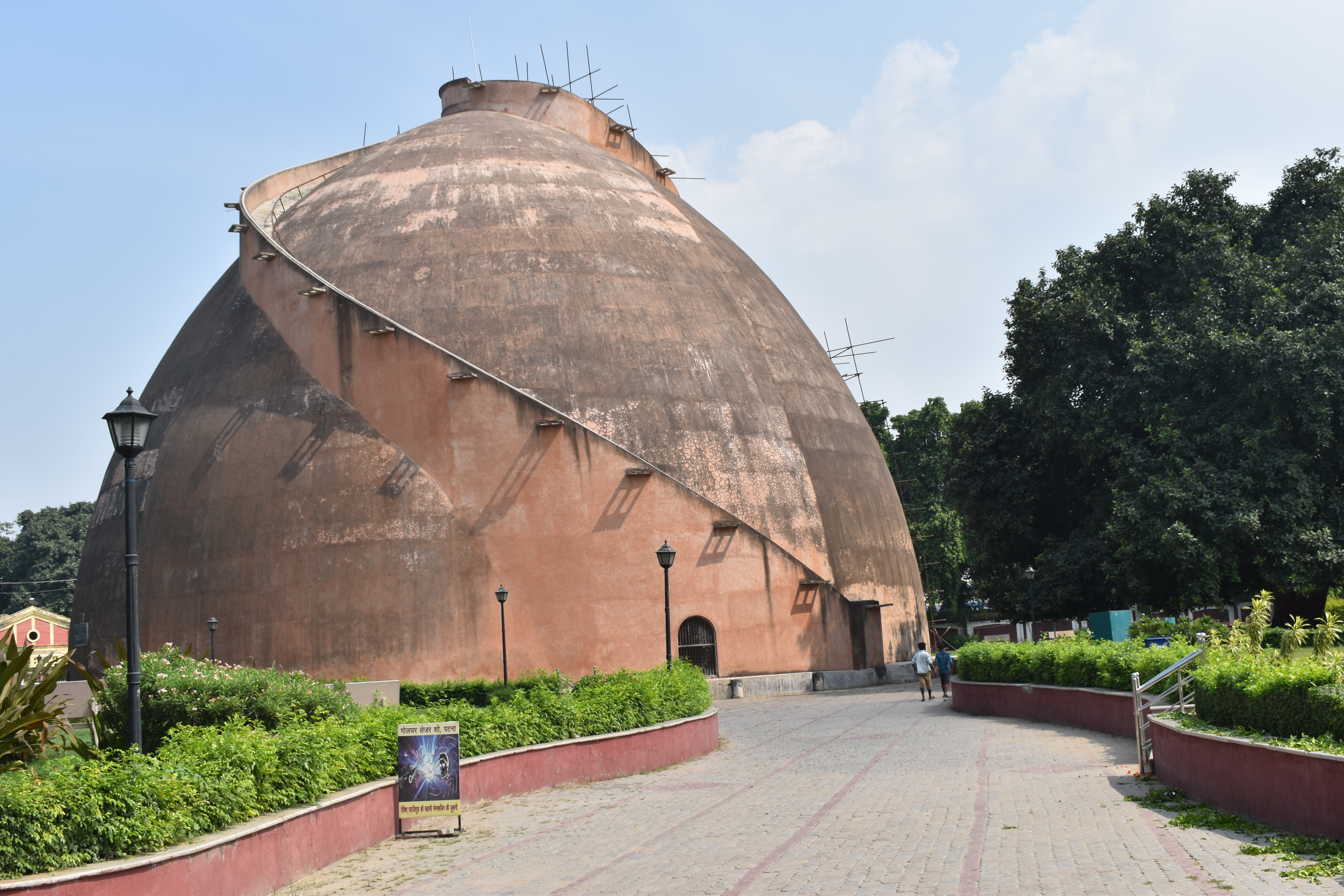
- Golghar
- Former names: The Granary at Patna

General information
- Architectural style: Stupa
- Location: Patna, Bihar, India
- Coordinates: 25°37′13″N 85°08′22″E
- Completed: 20 July 1786
- Owner: Bihar Government

Height
- Height: 29 m

Dimensions
- Diameter: 32–35 m

Design and construction
- Architect: Captain John Garstin

The Golghar or Gol Ghar (गोलघर), ("Round House") is a large granary located to the west of the Gandhi Maidan in Patna, capital city of Bihar state, India.

== History ==
According to a contemporary inscription at its base, the Golghar in Patna was intended to be just the first of a series of huge grain stores. In the end, however, no others were ever built. The granary was "part of a general plan … for the perpetual prevention of famine in these provinces".

The beehive-shaped structure was designed by John Garstin of the Bengal Engineers, part of the East India Company's Bengal Army. Its construction was completed on 20 July 1786.

A drive to improve the appearance of the structure was begun in 2002.

== Architecture ==
Built in the style of Stupa, the building has a height of 29 m. It is pillar-less with a wall 3.6 m thick at the base. The top of Golghar can be accessed via a 145-step spiral stairway. The spiral staircase was designed to facilitate the passage of the workers who loaded and unloaded the grain in the granary. The bags of grain would be carried up one flight, the load be emptied through a hole at the top, and the workers would descend the other stairs.

The top of the Golghar offers a panoramic view of the city and the Ganges.

Golghar has never been filled to its maximum capacity and there are no plans to do so. Some have claimed that the reason for this is a flaw whereby the doors are designed to open inwards; thus, if it is filled to its maximum capacity, then the doors will not open. However, visitors have found that the doors open outwards. In 2018, another renovation of the monument commenced.

== In popular culture ==
Golghar can be seen in the 2019 Hindi film India's Most Wanted.

== Gallery ==
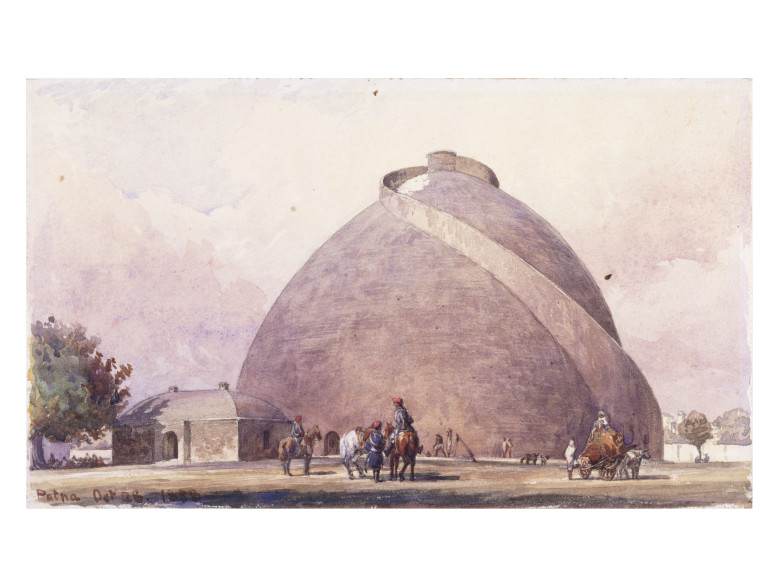
Golghar, Patna, painting of 1888

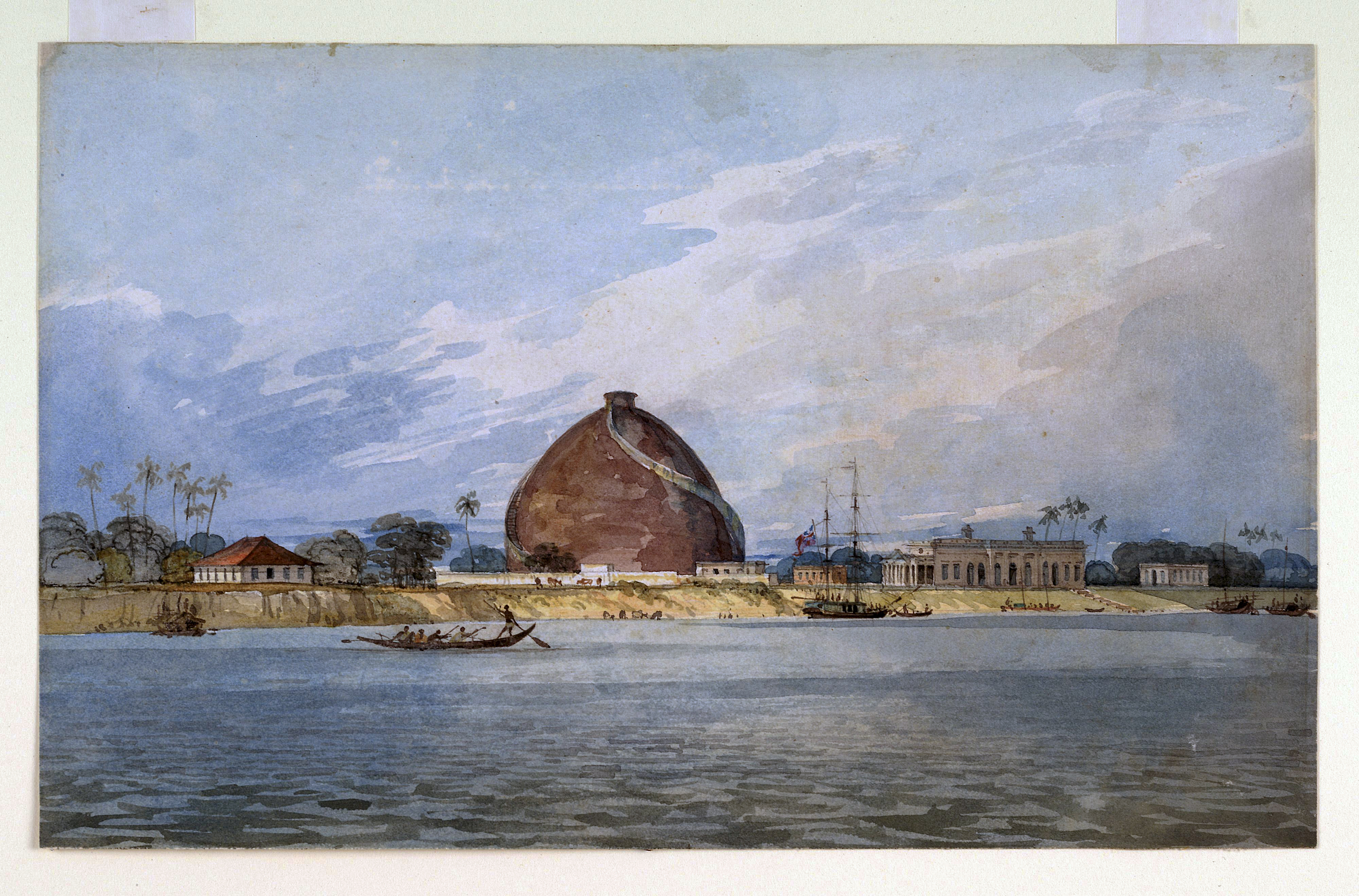
Gol Ghar, Patna, a 19th-century painting

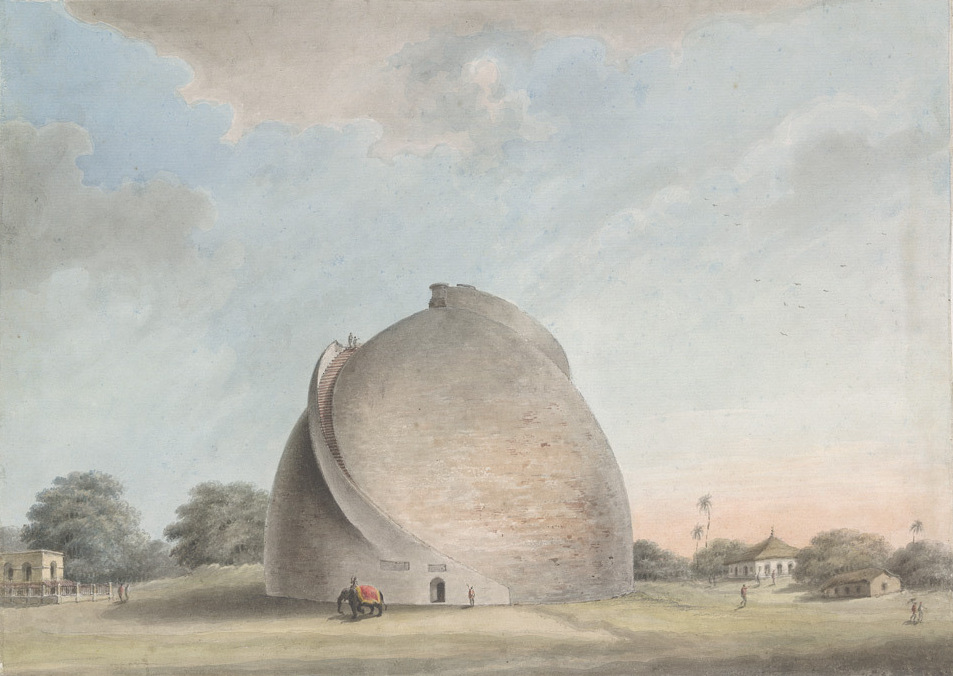
Gol Ghar, Patna 19th century painting, by Sita Ram

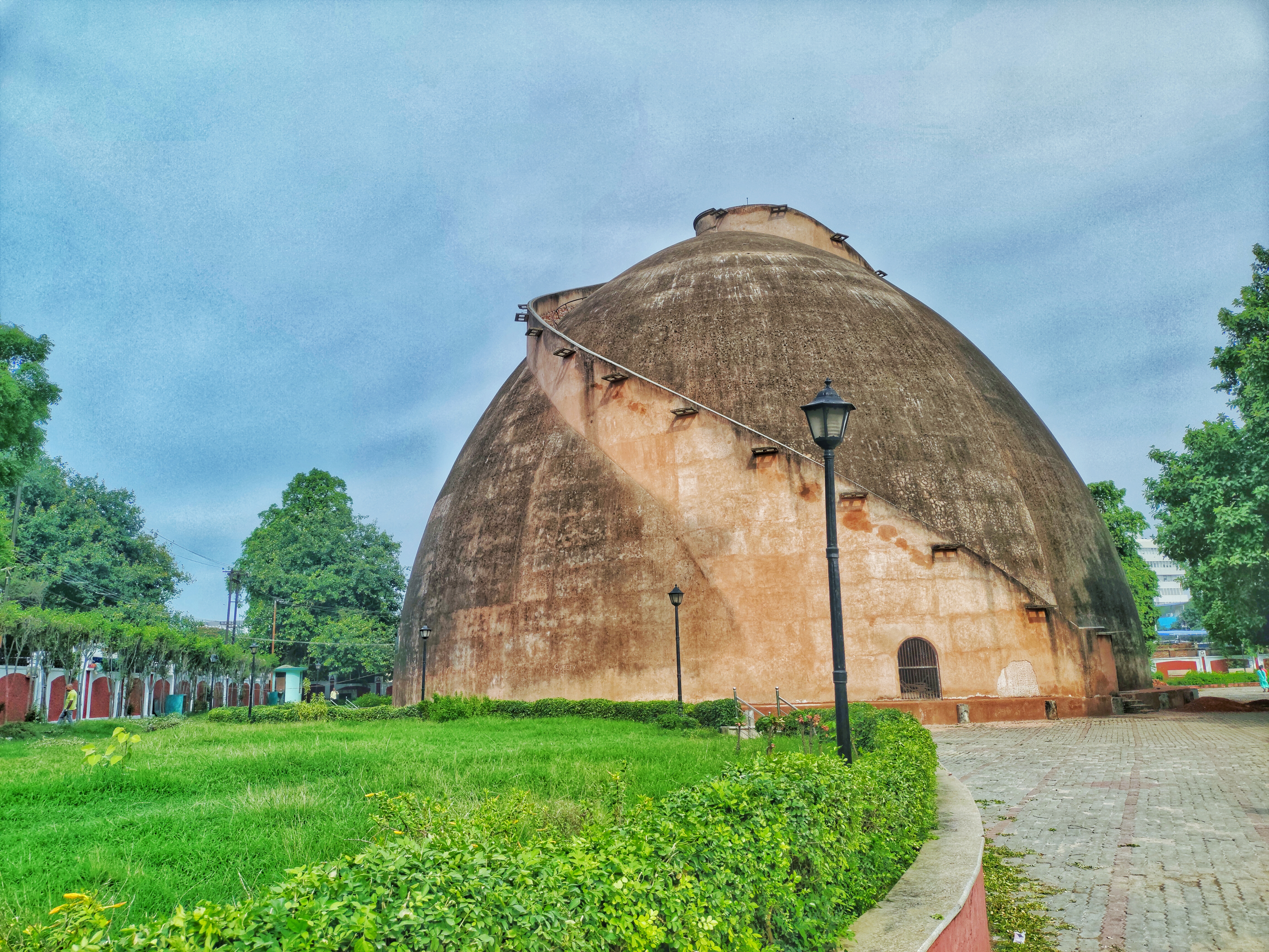
Golghar in July 2022

== See also ==
- Sabhyata Dwar
- Samrat Ashok International Convention Centre
- Buddha Smriti Park
- Bihar Museum
- List of tallest domes
