= Biscomaun Bhawan =

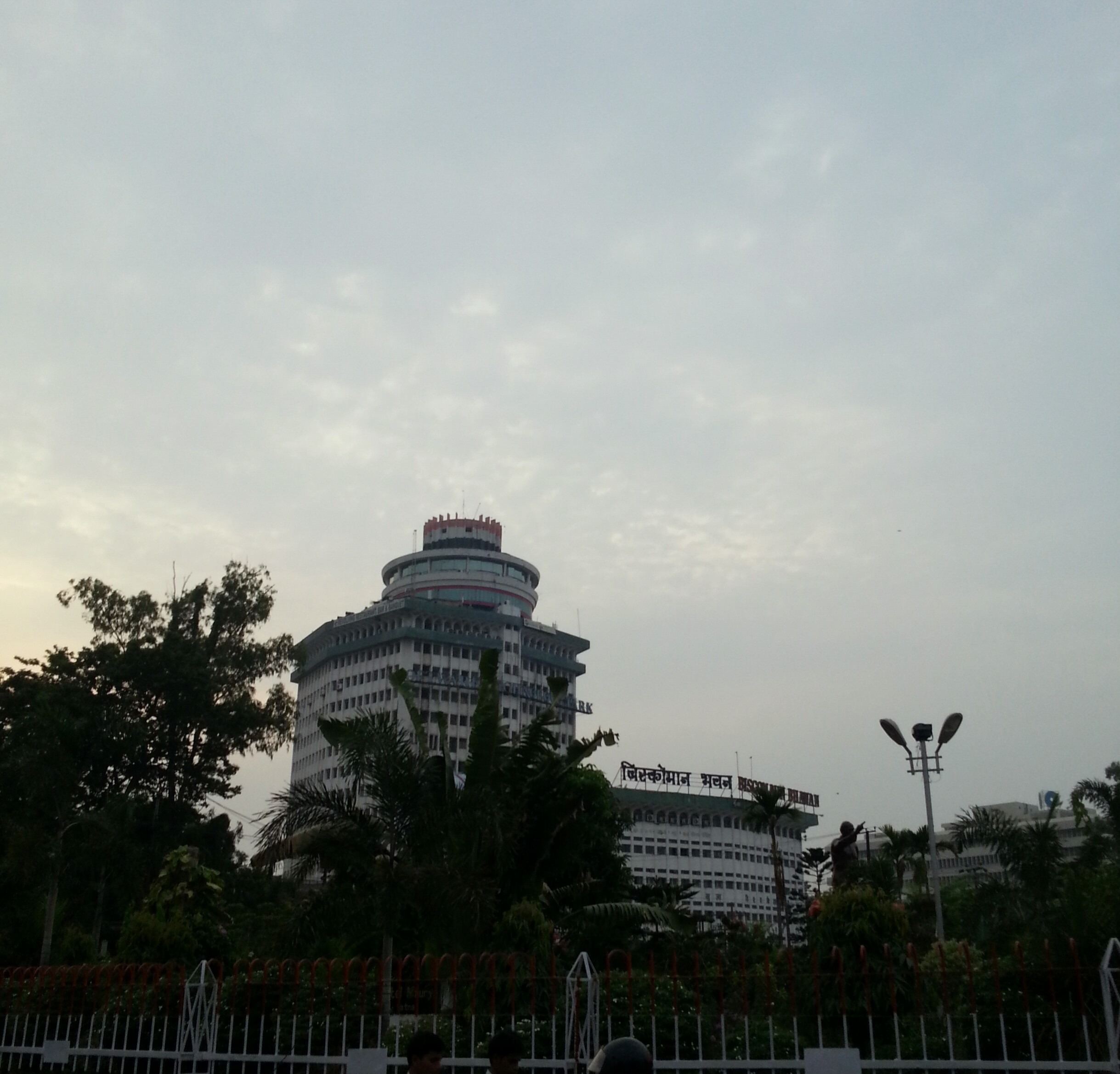
- Interactive map of the Biscomaun Bhawan area

General information
- Type: Public buildings
- Architectural style: Modern
- Location: Patna, Bihar, India, West Gandhi Maidan Marg
- Coordinates: 25.6203370°N 85.1394480°E
- Current tenants: Bihar government
- Inaugurated: 1971
- Client: Bihar government
- Owner: Bihar government
- Landlord: Bihar government

Technical details
- Floor count: 18

Biscomaun Bhawan is a public building that houses many of the administrative offices of Bihar. It houses many offices of the Bihar government, the Government of India, some private company offices, and the Nalanda Open University. It is the only building with a revolving restaurant (Pind Balluchi), and a software park in all of Bihar and Eastern India.
