= Kargil Chowk =

War memorial in Patna, India

- India
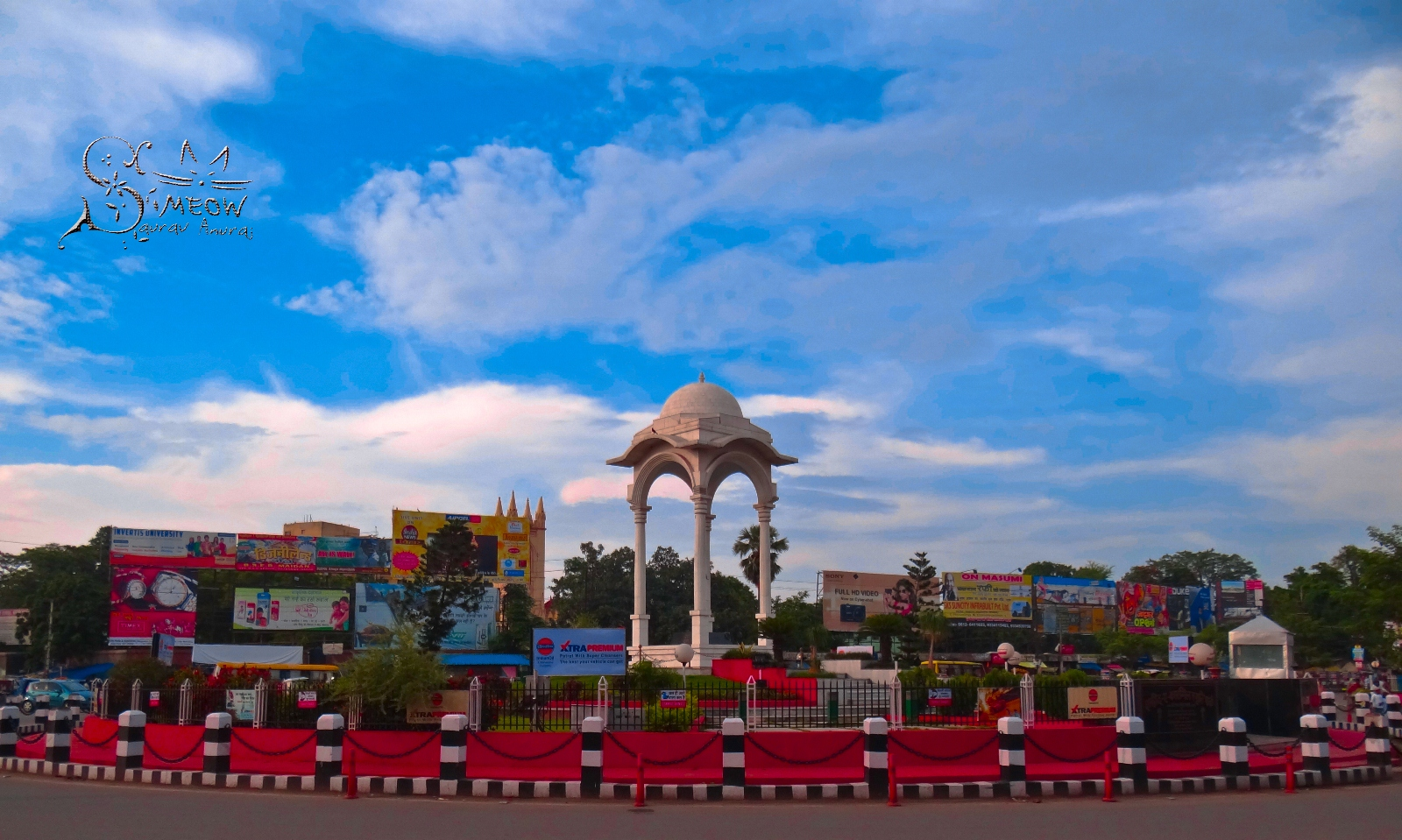
- View of the Kargil Chowk in Patna.
- For The Great Martyrs of Kargil War
- Established: 1999
- Unveiled: 2000
- Location: 25°36′28.77″N 85°10′03.06″E near Patna, Bihar, India
- To the great soldiers of Bihar & Jharkhand who sacrificed their lives in Kargil War.

Kargil Chowk is a War memorial. It was established in year 2000, at the North-East corner of Gandhi Maidan, Patna. It is dedicated to the soldiers from Bihar & Jharkhand who had sacrificed their lives in the Kargil War in 1999.

== List engraved names on Kargil Chowk ==
Following are the martyrs whose names are engraved on Kargil Chowk war memorial.

- Major Chandrabhushan Divedi
- General Digambar Dixit, Palamu
- General Prabhakar Kumar Singh, Bhagalpur
- Nayak Ganesh Prasad Yadav, Patna
- Lance Naik Rambachan Rai, Vaishali
- Lance Naik Vidyanand Singh, Bhojpur
- Naik Bishuni Rai, Saran
- Naik Subedar Nageshwar Mahato, Ranchi
- Naik Neeraj Kumar, Lakhisarai
- Naik Sunil Kumar Singh, Muzaffarpur
- Havaldar Ratan Kumar Singh, Bhagalpur
- Sepoy Hardeo Prasad Singh, Nalanda
- Sepoy Rambhu Singh, Siwan
- Sepoy Arvind Kumar Pandey, Poorvi Champaran
- Sepoy Pramod Kumar, Poorvi Champaran
- Sepoy Arvind Kumar Pandey, Poorvi Champaran
- Sepoy Raman Kumar Jha, Saharsa
- Sepoy Harikrishna Ram, Siwan

== In popular culture ==
Of late Kargil Chowk has witnessed several candle light marches by the general public to pay homage, to protest and to demand justice.

== See also ==
- Kargil (disambiguation)
- Kargil War
- Bihar Regiment
