= Bharatiya Nritya Kala Mandir =

Bharatiya Nritya Kala Mandir, Patna
- भारतीय नृत्य कला मंदिर, पटना
- Interactive map of Bharatiya Nritya Kala Mandir, Patna
- Address: Frazer Road, Patna - 800001 patna India

Construction
- Opened: 1963

The Bharatiya Nritya Kala Mandir (lit. 'Indian Dance Arts Temple') is an arts and crafts museum and a multi-purpose cultural centre located in Patna, in the capital of Bihar, India.

== History ==
The foundation stone for the institution of art was laid on 8 December 1950. Established by Padmashri Hari Uppal, a master in Manipuri and Kathakali dance forms, it was officially opened in 1963.

== Overview ==
The building contains dance and drama studios, a gallery space, and an art museum. The programme of performances ranges from theatre, to live music, comedy, dance, visual art, spoken word and children's events.

The art museum showcases a wide range of elements of antiquity. The items on display include terracotta, jewelry, metal objects, stone sculptures, stone tools, pottery, musical instruments, wooden palki, textiles and masks dated between 500 B.C. and A.D. 500. The dance instructors teach Odissi, Bharatnatyam, Kathak, folk dance, etc.

== See also ==
- Kalidas Rangalaya
