= Samrat Ashok International Convention Centre =

Samrat Ashok Convention Centre

General information
- Status: open
- Location: North Gandhi Maidan Marg, Patna, India
- Construction started: 8 February 2014
- Cost: ₹490-500 crore
- Owner: Government of Bihar

Other information
- Seating capacity: 5800

The Samrat Ashok Convention Centre is a convention centre on North Gandhi Maidan Marg, Patna, Bihar with an estimated budget of ₹490 crore. The foundation stone of the centre was laid by Nitish Kumar, the chief minister of Bihar on 8 February 2014. An expected, around 16,500 metric tonnes of steel is used in construction, which is more than the volume of steel used in raising Eiffel Tower and Indira Gandhi International Airport, New Delhi. The capacity of the main auditorium is around 5000. The Samrat Ashoka Convention centre has three major signature buildings- 1) Bapu Sabahagaar, an auditorium of 5000 seating capacity, 2) Gyan Bhawan with 800 capacity auditorium (lecture theater type), multipurpose hall and other conference halls of various capacities; and 3) Sabhyata Dwar (Civilization Gate). The centre was completed by April 2017 and has Gyan Bhawan, Bapu Sabhagaar, Multipurpose Hall, Plenary Hall, Modular Meeting Rooms with Basement Parking, Sabhyta Park With Sabhyata Dwar & food plaza. In February 2018, Samrat Ashoka Convention Kendra Patna won the 10th CIDC Vishwakarma Achievement Award for best construction projects in India.

== See also ==
- Shri Krishna Memorial Hall
- List of convention and exhibition centers
