= Shri Krishna Memorial Hall =

Arena in Patna, India

Coordinates: 25.6203°N 85.1470°E

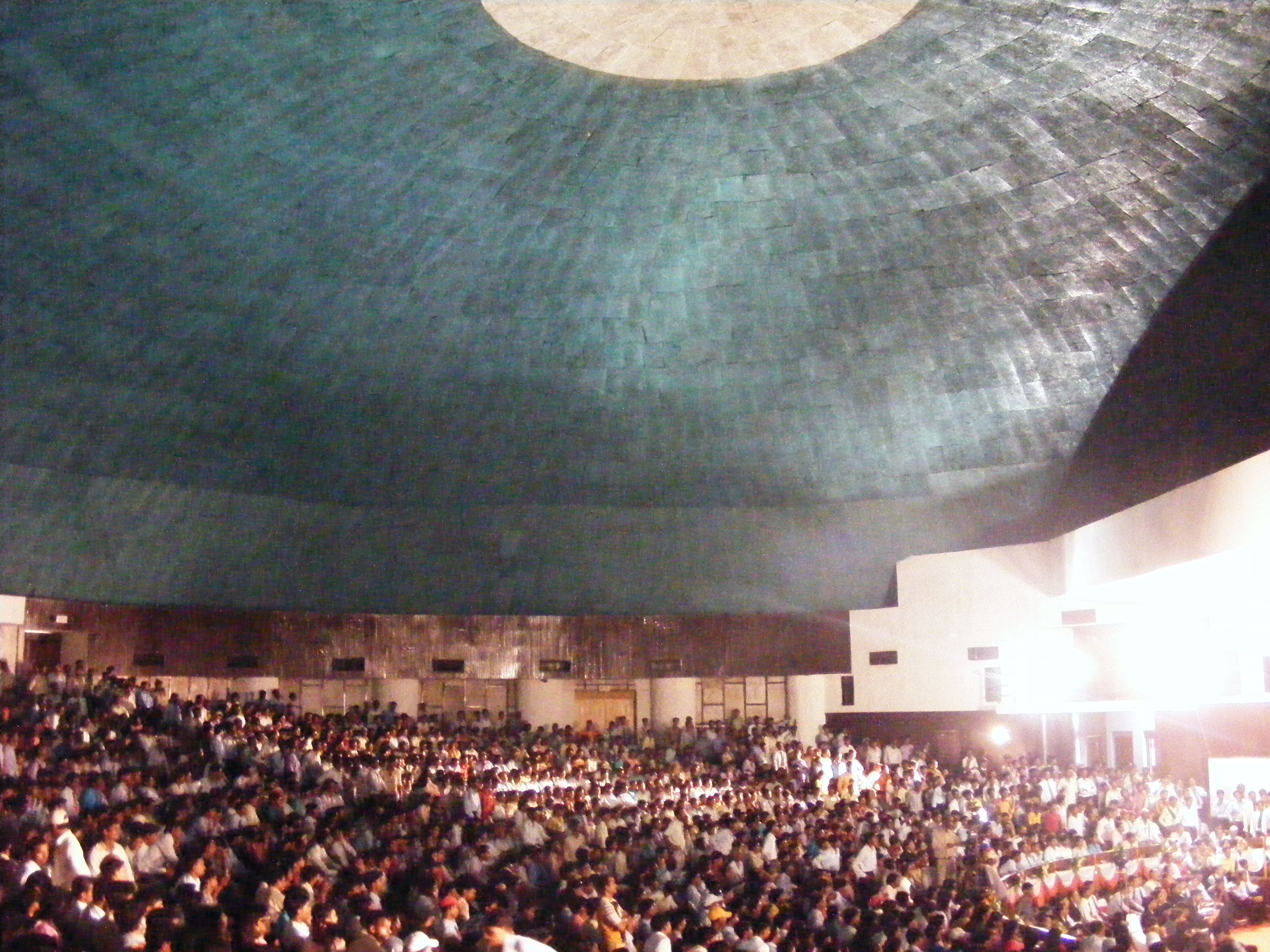
Inner view of Shri Krishna Memorial Hall

Shri Krishna Memorial Hall (popularly known as S K Memorial Hall) is a multipurpose arena located in the Gandhi Maidan area of Patna, Bihar. It was built in honour of the first Chief Minister of Bihar, Sri Krishna Sinha. Originally completed in 1976 with a seating capacity of 2,000, the centre has undergone numerous renovations and expansions. It is second largest auditorium in Bihar. It can also be used for conventions, trade shows, concert performances, banquets and other events.

== See also ==
- Patna International Convention Centre
