= Rajgir Mahotsav =

Indian festival

- Logo of Rajgir Mahotsav
- Status: active
- Genre: festivals
- Frequency: Annually
- Venue: State guest house ground, Rajgir International Convention center
- Locations: Rajgir, Nalanda district, Bihar
- Country: India
- Years active: 1986–1989; 1994–present
- Inaugurated: 4 April 1986
- Most recent: 26–28 November 2026
- Website: nalanda.bih.nic.in/en

Rajgir Mahotsav or festival, formerly Rajgir Nritaya (Dance) Mahotsav, is a festival of dance and music. It is an annual three-day event in Rajgir, Bihar, India, that was first held in 1986. It is organized by the Nalanda district administration with the help of the Government of Bihar’s Department of Culture and Bihar State Tourism Development Corporation.

== Overview ==
Bindeshwari Dubey, the then Chief Minister of Bihar, had inaugurated the festival in Swarna Bhadar area of Rajgir on 4 April 1986. The Tourism Department of Bihar Government had sponsored festival until 1989. After 1989, event abandoned for reasons unknown. Few years later in 1994, it was again started and since then, it is an annual event in the calendar of Bihar Government.

Various competitions on Tonga race (horse drawn carriers), martial arts competitions, mehndi contest, mahila utsav, food plaza, gramshree mela etc. have been introduced recently besides organizing performance by artists of national and international repute. It was held on Qila Maidan located in the backdrop of Ratnagiri hills.

In 2016, Rajgir Mahotsav was organized from 25 to 27 November. In 2017, Rajgir Mahotsav was organized from 25 to 27 November.

After Successful Rajgir Mahotsav of 2019, Rajgir Mahotsav of 2020 was cancelled due to the COVID-19 pandemic. Mukesh Kumar, manager at a hotel run by the BSTDC said that in 2020 also, majority of the state tourism functions were cancelled due to Covid. “Events like Buddha Purnima, Rajgir Mahotsav and Sonepur fair had to be cancelled,” he said.

The Rajgir Mohatsav was continued in 2022, and have since been held annually for 3 days in the late November–early December part of the year. The venue of the event have since been moved to State guest house ground near Rajgir international convention centre.
