= Bihar Police =

Police Service of Bihar

- Bihar Police Insignia
- Common name: Bihar Police
- Abbreviation: BP
- Motto: उत्कृष्टता की यात्रा A Voyage of Excellence

Agency overview
- Formed: 1935
- Annual budget: ₹20,132.87 crore (US$2.2 billion) (2026-27)

Jurisdictional structure
- Operations jurisdiction: Bihar, IN
- Map of Bihar State Police Jurisdiction.
- Governing body: Bihar Government
- General nature: Local civilian police

Operational structure
- Headquarters: Sardar Patel Bhawan, Bailey Road, Patna
- Elected officer responsible: Samrat Chaudhary, Chief Minister
- Agency executive: Preeta Verma (IPS), Director General of Police
- Child agency: Patna Police

Website
- https://police.bihar.gov.in

The Bihar Police is the law enforcement agency for the state of Bihar, India, with its headquarters in Patna. As per official figures, Bihar Police has a sanctioned strength of 2,29,000 personnel, and as of 2024, it employs 1,10,000 personnel.

The present DGP of Bihar Police is Preeta Verma, an IPS officer of 1991 batch.

== History ==
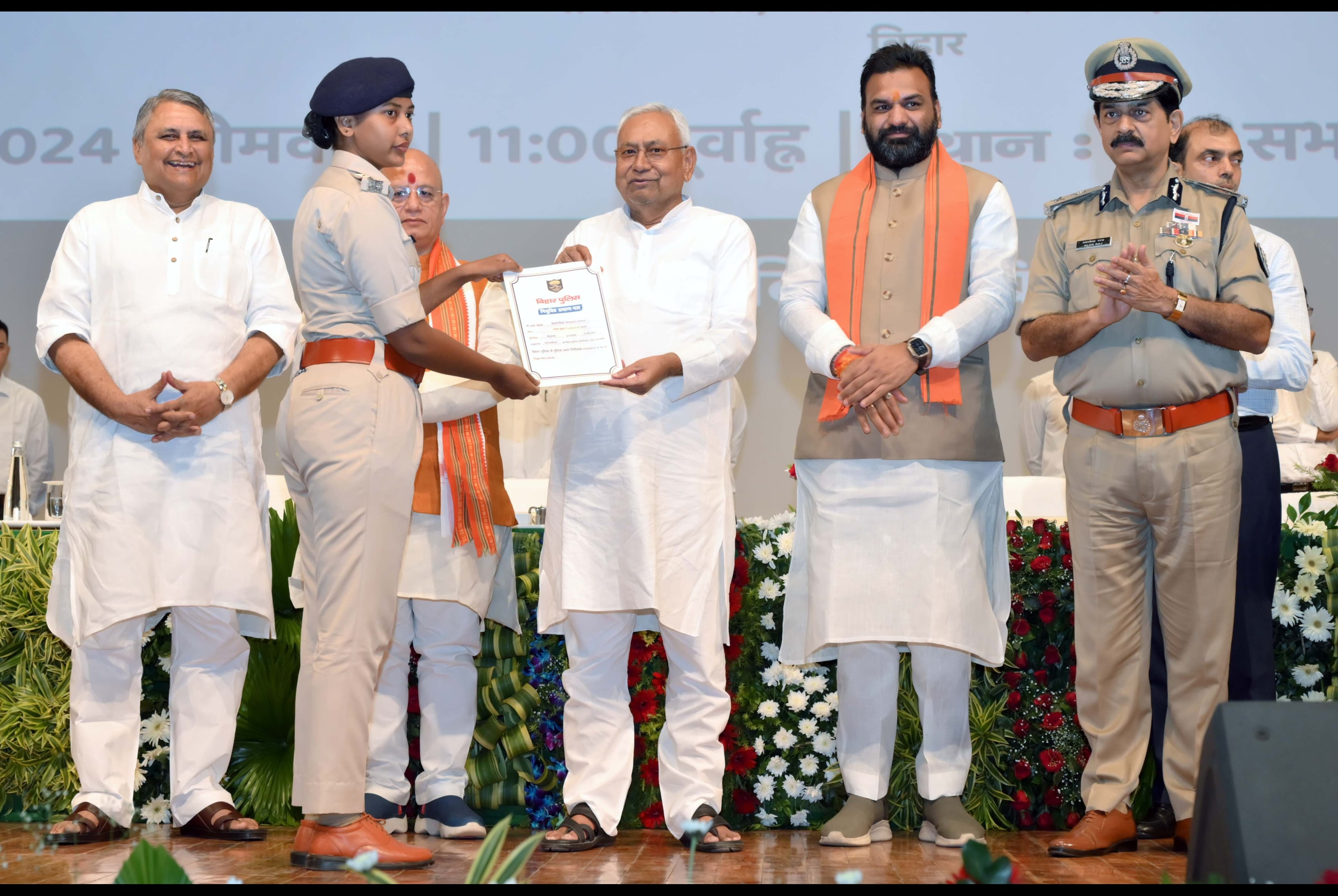
Nitish Kumar, Samrat Chaudhary and Vijay Kumar Choudhary participating in appointment letter distribution of women police officials in October 2024.

There is historical evidence of the adoption of intensive policing practices in the Magadh empire more than 2,000 years ago, where the head of police was known as Dandapala. His main role was to maintain law and order in the society while implementing harsh injunctions of Arthashastra to collect taxes and suppress rebellions.

Modern policing in Bihar started in 1862 under the provisions of the Police Act, 1861. After Bihar was carved out as an independent province in 1912 from Bengal, the basic structure of police was created as it exists today. After its major reorganization several pre-eminent police officers adorned pre-independent Bihar Police Force. These included Mr. Walter Swain of Swain Beat system fame, Shri AK Sinha, the first Indian to become an IGP of any province, Shri BN Mullick, the second director of the Intelligence Bureau (IB), Khan Bahadur Azizul Haque, credited with the primary development of the famous ‘1024 pigeon holes’ cabinet system eventually named after his supervisor, Sir Edward Richard Henry.

Post independence, Bihar Police led innovative policing measures, such as the creation of a Police Welfare fund, Police Hospitals and Police Information Room (PIR) in 1952. Bihar Policemen's Association, which looks after the interests of policemen, was one of the first police welfare associations in all of India in 1967. A Police Commission was also set up in 1958, whose mandate was to bring the police closer to the people. Patna Police got its new headquarter Sardar Patel Bhavan, Bailey Road in 2018. The seven storied building with a helipad at the top is spread over almost 53,000 sqft area. Prior to this, police headquarter of Bihar Police was located at the old secretariat building since 1917.

== Organizational structure ==
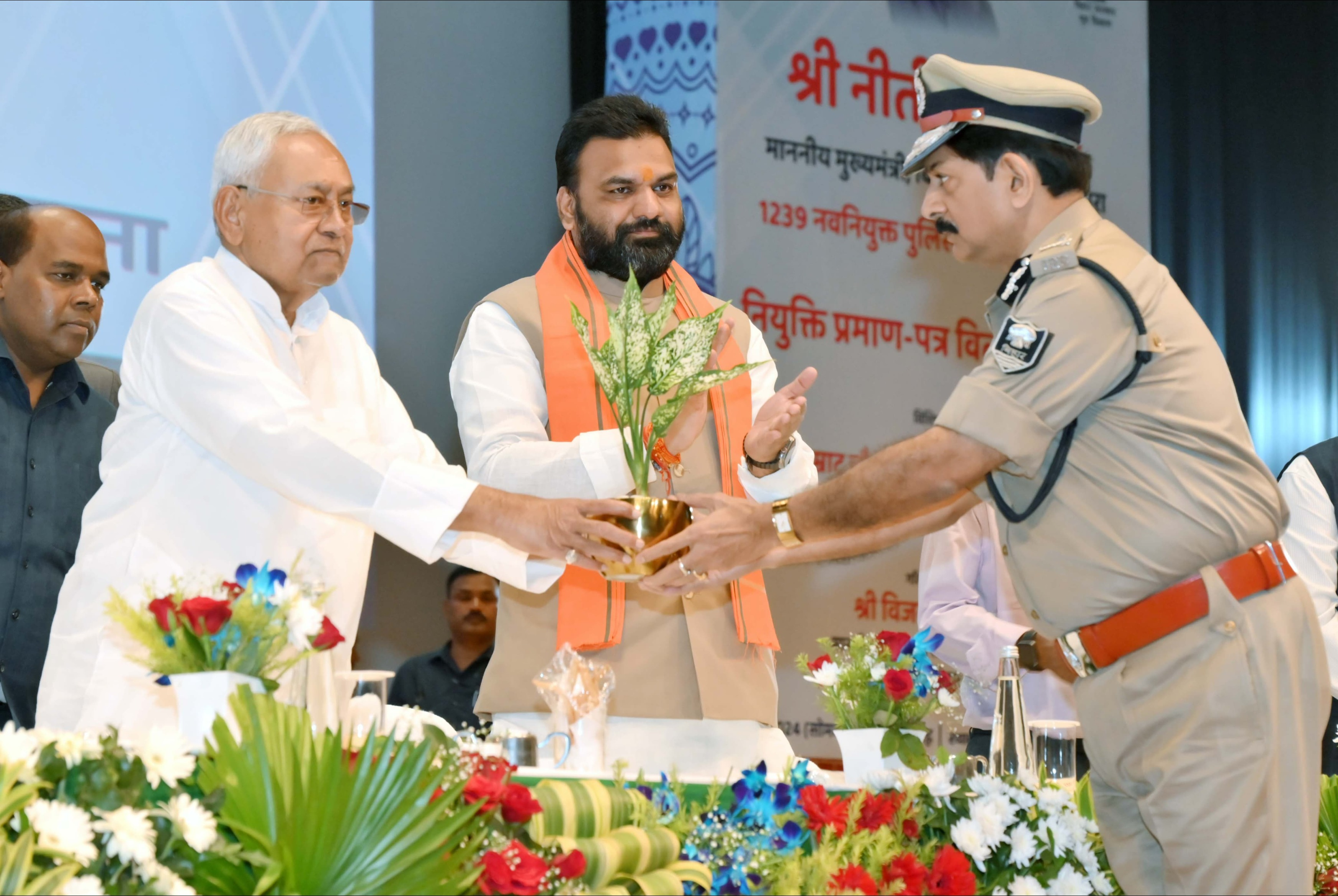
Bihar Chief Minister Nitish Kumar and Deputy Chief Minister Samrat Chaudhary distributing appointment letters to 1239 newly appointed police sub-inspectors in October 2024.

Bihar Police comes under the direct control of the Department of Home Affairs, Government of Bihar. It has six divisions under the organizational structure, namely, Human Resource Development and Training Division (TRG), Law & Order Division (L & O), Establishment and Legal Division, Personnel and Welfare Division, Headquarter (DGP Office) and Budget Division (HQRT), and Modernization, Crime Records and Provision Division (SCRB &Mod). These are headed by four Additional Director General (ADGP), where ADGP (HQRT) has an additional charge of Welfare division, and ADGP (L & O) with that of Establishment and Legal Division. The Training division is headed by DGP (Training), while the latter five are headed by Director General (DGP).

For geographic workload distribution, the state is divided into 12 ranges, each range consisting of 2 to 5 districts. The central range (Patna), Magadh range (Gaya), Tirhut range (Muzaffarpur), Mithila range (Darbhanga) and Purnia range are headed by officers in the rank of Inspector General of Police, while other seven ranges are headed by Deputy Inspector General ranked officers. Each district is commanded by a Superintendent of Police (SP), where as Patna, Muzaffarpur, Gaya, Bhagalpur, Darbhanga and Saran at Chhapra are under a Senior Superintendent of Police.

Earlier, the state also had a zonal division into four police zones. Introduced in 1982, each zone consisted of two to four ranges, and was headed by an IG level officer. This system was abolished in 2019, and only rail police zone continues to exist.

=== List of ranges ===
List of 12 Police Ranges and Police Districts in Bihar is as follows:

Sr No	Police Districts	Police Range
1.	Begusarai & Khagaria	Begusarai range
2.	East Champaran, West Champaran & Bagaha	Champaran range
3.	Bhagalpur, Banka & Naugachhia	Eastern range
4.	Patna & Nalanda	Central range
5.	Darbhanga, Madhubani & Samastipur	Mithila range
6.	Jamui, Lakhisarai, Munger & Sheikhpura	Munger range
7.	Arwal, Aurangabad, Jehanabad, Nawada & Gaya	Magadh range
8.	Araria, Katihar, Kishanganj & Purnia	Purnia range
9.	Madhepura, Saharsa & Supaul	Kosi range
10.	Saran, Siwan & Gopalganj	Saran range
11.	Bhojpur, Buxar, Kaimur & Rohtas	Shahabad range
12.	Muzaffarpur, Sheohar, Sitamarhi & Vaishali	Tirhut range

== Hierarchy ==
Officers

- Director General of Police (DGP)
- Additional Director General of Police (ADGP)
- Inspector General of Police (IGP)
- Deputy Inspector General of Police (DIG)
- Senior Superintendent of Police (SSP)
- Superintendent of Police (SP)
- Additional Superintendent of Police (Addl.SP)
- Assistant Superintendent of Police (ASP) or Deputy Superintendent of Police (DSP)

Sub-ordinates

- Inspector of Police or SHO
- Sub-Inspector of Police (SI)
- Assistant Sub-Inspector of Police (ASI)
- Head Constable / Havildar
- Senior Constable / Police Naik
- Constable

== Notable initiatives ==
=== Ladli Cops ===
An initiative in Community Policing for the safety of Women. The CID Branch of Bihar Police under the Leadership of Alok Raj (IPS) ADG in association with Mr. Roushan Kumar and Dr. Suman Lal founders Ladli Foundation came up with the concept of having Women Community Police to provide a safe and secure atmosphere to the inhabitants. Also to make women become familiar with Police and deeply understand the police system to invoke their taboo to interact with police station/ policemen. For this initiative, volunteer from girls studying in different colleges of Patna were identified and trained. Each of these girls were provided with ID Cards authorised by Bihar Police and are called Ladli Cops.

== Controversies and criticism ==
In contrast with several states, the Bihar Police has been notoriously condemned for corruption, colluding with mafias and criminal gangs, political influence and interference, and old school mindset. Bihar has also been noted to have the lowest police to population ratio of 81 per 100,000 people, which is quite below the national level of 155 while sanctioned strength is 198, and even way below UN recommendations of 222. As policing is a state responsibility, Bihar Police still follows the colonial and archaic Police Act of 1861, which has negatively impacted law and order, investigations, and led to police brutality.

The Bihar Police was notoriously involved in the 1980 Bhagalpur blindings, where acid was poured into the eyes of 31 individuals, either convicted or undertrial. The incident was widely discussed, debated and acutely criticised by several human rights organizations. Given the extreme misconduct, the Supreme Court of India ordered compensation to the victims for violation of basic human rights.

During the tenure of Lalu Prasad Yadav as Chief Minister, he interfered in policing of entire state to prevent any cases against the political leaders as well as party workers. Yadav was also responsible for preventing police reforms.

Furthermore, during Yadav's tenure as Chief Minister, Bihar's law and order was at lowest, kidnapping was on rise and private armies mushroomed. He was also criticized by opposition in the Shilpi-Gautam Murder case and the death of his daughter Ragini Yadav's friend, Abhishek Mishra, in mysterious circumstances - both cases were heavily covered up by Bihar Police on Yadav's orders, the former of which prompted an investigation from the CBI. Yadav attempted to also influence the Fodder Scam investigations, which was subsequently later taken over by the CBI and led to his conviction.

== Equipment ==
All the equipment of the Bihar Police are manufactured indigenously by the Indian Ordnance Factories controlled by the Ordnance Factories Board, Ministry of Defence, Government of India.

Name	Country of origin	Type	References
Pistol Auto 9mm 1A	India	Semi-automatic pistol	
Heckler & Koch MP5	West Germany	Submachine gun	
Sterling submachine gun	India	Submachine gun	
Ishapore 2A1	India	Rifle	
1A SLR	India	Rifle	
INSAS	India	Rifle	
AKM	Soviet Union	Rifle	

== See also ==
- Patna Police
- State Armed Police Forces
