= Kalidas Rangalaya =

Art school in Patna, India

- Logo of Bihar Art Theatre
- Address: South East Gandhi Maidan, Patna - 800 004; India
- Owner: Bihar Art Theatre

Construction
- Opened: 1974

Website
- kalidasrangalaya.com

Kalidas Rangalaya is one of Bihar's well-known theatres and a center for cultural performances in Patna, India. It is in the southeast corner of Gandhi Maidan and is run by the Bihar Art Theater which is the regional centre of International Theatre Institute, UNESCO, Paris.

== History ==
Named after Kālidāsa, it was established on 9 October 1974 by Anil Kumar Mukherjee. It is built on land given by the Government of Bihar to Bihar Art Theater to promote and pursue theatrical and cultural activities in the state capital.

== Overview ==
Today the Kalidas Rangalaya consists of a stage, auditorium, Bihar Institute of Dramatics office and a cafeteria, known as 'Annapurna'. The complex also houses Shakuntala Janta Theater, Priyambada Children's Theater, Anasuya Art Gallery and Abhyathna Guest House for artists. Classes in dance and music forms, painting, and photography are offered at the complex.

== See also ==
- Bhartiya Nritya Kala Mandir
- Premchand Rangshala
- Manoj Bhawuk has done his diploma in Drama
