= Baragaon, Nalanda =

Coordinates: 25.1348°N 85.4320°E

Baragaon
- village
- Interactive map of Baragaon
- Country: India
- State: Bihar
- District: nalanda

Languages
  - Official: Magahi, Hindi
- Time zone: UTC+5:30 (IST)
- ISO 3166 code: IN-BR

Baragaon is a village in Nalanda District of Bihar state, India. It is 2 kilometres (1.2 mi) from Nalanda Railway station toward north-west direction. It is known for its Chhath Puja celebrations, performed at a large pond in the village and attended by people from across northern Bihar. There is a big ancient temple of God Surya (Sun temple).
