= Patna Police =

Patna Police पटना पुलिस

Agency overview
- Employees: 10,760 (Uniformed)

Jurisdictional structure
- Operations jurisdiction: Patna, Bihar, India
- Areas of Patna Police's jurisdiction in Bihar
- Area: 3,202 square kilometres (1,236 sq mi)
- Population: 5,838,465 (2011)
- Legal jurisdiction: Patna district
- Governing body: Home Department (Bihar)
- General nature: Local civilian police

Operational structure
- Overseen by: General Administration Deptt., Govt. of Bihar
- Headquarters: Police HQ, North Gandhi Maidan Marg, Patna- 800004
- Agency executive: Kartikeya Kumar Sharma, IPS, Senior Superintendent of Police
- Parent agency: Bihar Police
- Units: List: Aviation; Emergency Service; Organized Crime Control Bureau; Special Victims; Major Case Squad; Taxi Squad; Movie and Television; School Safety; Real Time Crime; Auxiliary Police; Crime Scene; Evidence Collection; Transit Bureau; Housing Bureau; Highway Patrol; Transportation Bureau

Facilities
- stations: 75

Website
- patna.nic.in/police/

Patna Police (Hindi: पटना पुलिस) is the police service responsible for law enforcement within Patna district, including the capital city of Patna in an Indian state of Bihar. Patna Police is the largest police service in the state. Its headquarters are at Gandhi Maidan Marg in Patna.

== History ==
Patna is one of the oldest continuously inhabited places in the world, and policing in Patna is more than 3000 years old.

== Today ==
Patna police is broadly divided into four regions namely Central, East, West and Rural, each headed by a Superintendent of Police. For administrative purposes, each region is subdivided into Neighbourhood Policing Teams, each led by an Inspector. The Neighbourhood Policing Team's are responsible for the bulk of the community work undertaken in an area, and look to deal with long term local issues including anti-social behaviour.

The Traffic Police is a semi-autonomous body under the Patna Police.

Services provided by the Patna Police include:

- Preventing, detecting and investigating crime;
- Monitoring and promoting road safety;
- Maintaining social order;
- Performing and coordinating search and rescue operations; and
- Emergency management
- Stopping illegal constructions and frauds
- They have also started special investigation against liquors and old currency notes of 500 and 1000 INR after the ban.

Further policing duties performed are traffic control, intelligence analysis and anti-terrorism investigation. The overall mission of the Patna Police is to protect life and property and to detect and prevent crime.

== Hierarchy ==
The rank structure of Patna Police officers is as follows (in descending order of seniority):

Zonal level

- Inspector General of Police (IG) - Patna Zone

Range level

- Deputy Inspector General of Police (DIG) - Central Range (Patna + Nalanda)

District level

- Senior Superintendent of Police (SSP)
- (five) Superintendent of Police (SP)
  - SP City Central
  - SP City East
  - SP City West
  - SP Rural
  - SP Traffic
- Additional Superintendent of Police (ASP)
- Assistant Superintendent of Police

Circle level

- (Fifteen) Deputy Superintendent of Police (DSP)

Station level

- Inspector/ Station House Officer (SHO)
- Sub-Inspector of Police
- Assistant Sub-Inspector of Police

Constabulary

- Head Constable
- Senior Constable
- Constable

Recently, a proposal for creating police commissioner system for the state capital has been sent to the state government by Bihar Police, the parent agency.

== Equipment ==
All the equipment of the Patna Police are manufactured indigenously by the Indian Ordnance Factories controlled by the Ordnance Factories Board, Ministry of Defence, Government of India.

- Wooden Baton
- Revolver 0.32
- Pistol Auto 9mm 1A
- 9mm SAF Carbine 1A1
- 7.62 mm Ishapore 2A1 Rifle
- RFI L1A1 Self-Loading Rifle
- AK 47/ AKM
- INSAS Rifle

== Vehicles ==
- Mahindra Legend
- Chevrolet Tavera
- Mahindra Xylo
- Toyota Qualis
- Maruti Gypsy
- Royal Enfield Bullet
- Hero MotoCorp Glamour
- TVS Apache
- Mahindra Bolero
- Tata Sumo
- Mahindra Thar
- Mahindra Scorpio
- Maruti Ertiga
