= Frazer Road =

Frazer Road Mazharul Haque Path
- Neighbourhood
- Location in Patna, India
- Coordinates: 25°35′47″N 85°8′22″E
- Country: India
- State: Bihar
- Metro: Patna

Languages
  - Spoken: Hindi, English
- Time zone: UTC+5:30 (IST)
- PIN: 800001
- Planning agency: Patna Metropolitan Area Authority
- Civic agency: Patna Municipal Corporation

Frazer Road (officially Mazharul Haque Path) is a mixed residential-cum-commercial neighbourhood in Patna. This is the road most frequently heard after coming out from the Patna Junction as it connects Patna Junction to Gandhi Maidan Marg - the two major hubs of the city. It emerges from the south-west corner of Gandhi Maidan. It merges with Gandhi Maidan Marg, which takes a full circle of the Gandhi Maidan. Fraser Road passes through Dakbangla Chauraha, which is an important crossing in the city. The area around Frazer Road, including New Dak Bangla Road, Exhibition Road, and S P Verma Road has big brand names in marketing and covers all types of shops. Frazer Road is a location for hotels, restaurants, bars, and high-street stores in the capital of the Indian state of Bihar. Kotwali PS serves the area under Patna Police.

== See also ==
- Bailey Road, Patna
