= Gandhi Maidan =

Historic ground cation in Patna, Bihar

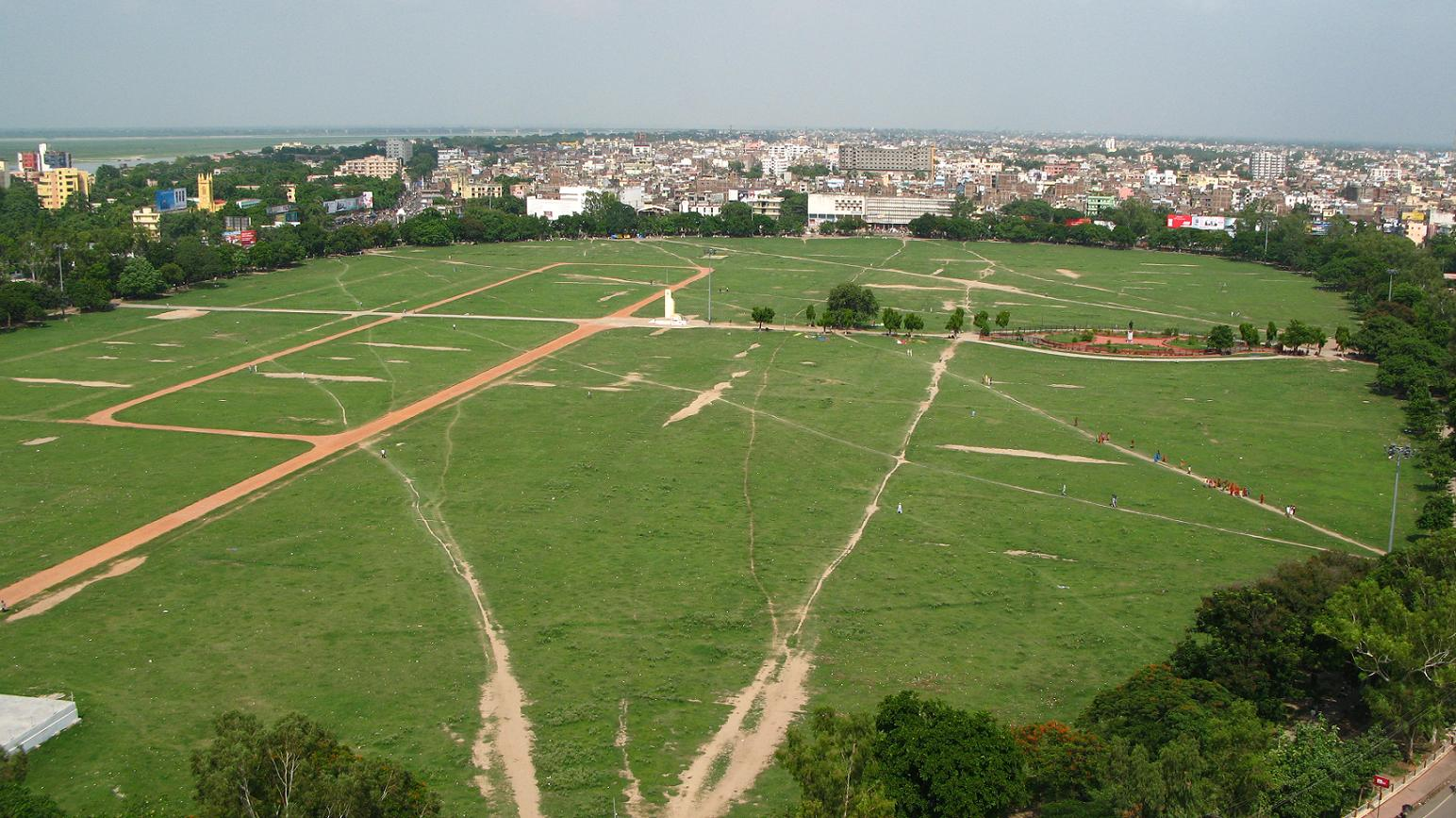
- Gandhi Maidan
- Interactive map of Gandhi Maidan
- Location: Patna, India; 25°36′28.77″N 85°10′03.06″E
- Operator: Patna Municipal Corporation
- Open: Year-round

Gandhi Maidan is a historic ground in Patna, near the banks of the Ganges River, in Bihar, India. The Golghar lies to its west. During the period of 1824–1833, under British rule, it was used as a golf course and horse racing track and was called Patna Lawns. It is spread across 60 acres of land. It has a great political significance as well.

Khairun Miya had donated this piece of land to help further the national movement and several important meetings of well-known freedom fighters were held here.

== History ==
Several movements were launched on the Patna Lawns during the Indian freedom struggle, the most important being the Champaran movement and the Quit India movement of 1942. A number of prominent leaders of the Indian Independence Movement, such as Mahatma Gandhi, Rajendra Prasad, Anugrah Narayan Sinha, Sardar Vallabhbhai Patel, Maulana Azad, Jawaharlal Nehru, Jayaprakash Narayan and Sri Krishna Sinha addressed their rallies from here. It was said that a leader had not arrived until he had addressed a rally at the Patna Lawns.

JP Movement, the successful opposition movement to Indira Gandhi, was also launched from this historic ground.

Presently, this ground is used for private parties, mass prayers and trade fairs. The flag-raising ceremony on the Indian Independence Day and Republic Day is held here by the Chief Minister and Governor of Bihar respectively.

In the north western corner lies the Gandhi Sangrahalaya, which showcases various pictures and records of Mahatma Gandhi's presence and connections with Bihar. During 1947, it was the house of the Education Minister, Syed Mahmud. These grounds are situated near Ashok Rajpath in Moradpur and are 2.5 km from central Patna.

During his Bihar visit at the time of Champaran Satyagraha, Mahatma Gandhi addressed a huge meeting at Patna Lawns. That meeting was the first time Indians were allowed to visit Patna Lawn without any restrictions. Until then, entry was restricted to Europeans and the elite (Loyalist Indians).

The historic Patna Lawn was renamed Gandhi Maidan in 1948 after his assassination as a tribute. A statue of Gandhi was erected in 1990s near the southern end.

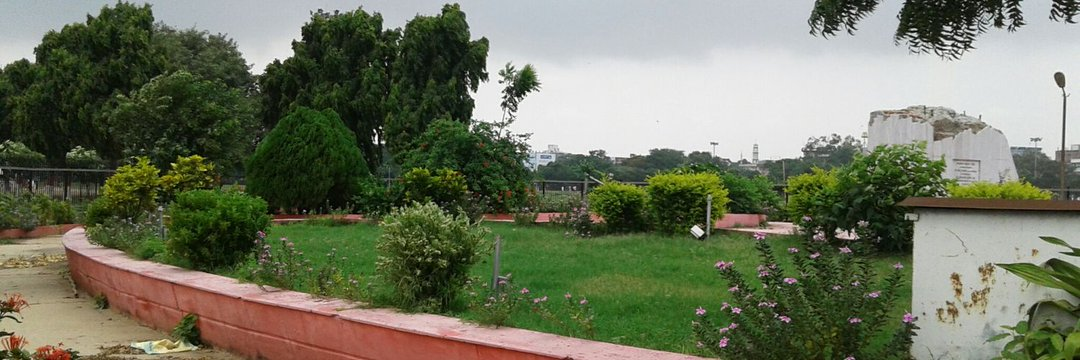
This beautiful site was seen in Bihar's Gandhi Maidan, Patna; Bihar before 2016; but on the name of redevelopment of Gandhi Maidan, this site was vanished.

== World's tallest statue of Mahatma Gandhi ==
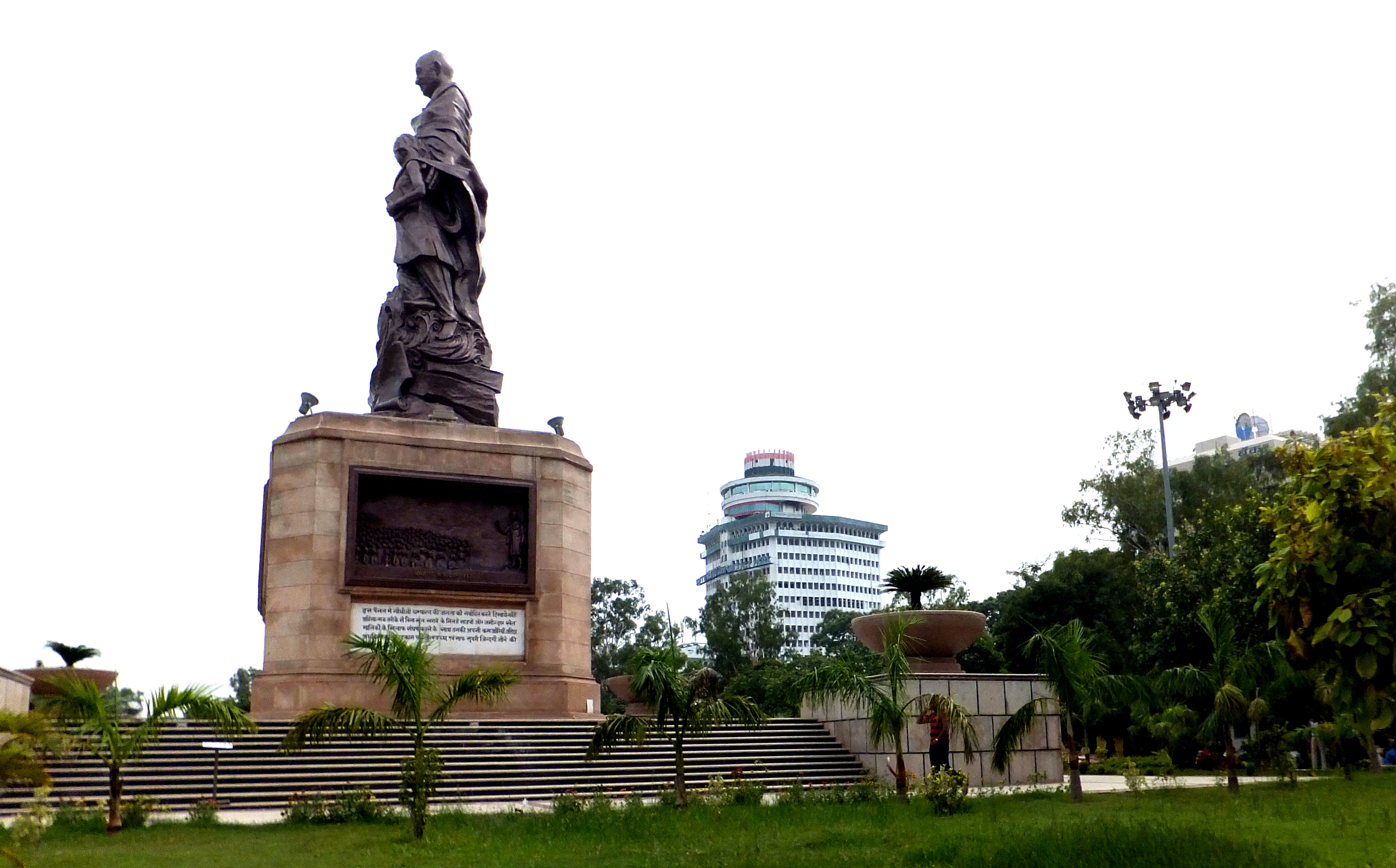
World's tallest statue of Mahatma Gandhi

On 27 October 2013, there were six serial bomb blasts at Gandhi Maidan just before the BJP's prime ministerial candidate Narendra Modi reached there to address a huge gathering. Eight people were killed and 66 injured in the serial blasts.

On 3 October 2014 a stampede took place in Gandhi Maidan, on the occasion of Dussehra festival, in which reportedly 32 people died.

== See also ==
- Patna Book Fair
- Gandhi Sangrahalaya, Patna
