= Patna Metropolitan Area Authority =

- PMAA

Agency overview
- Formed: 11 September 2014; 11 years ago
- Type: City Planning Agency
- Jurisdiction: Patna Metropolitan Region
- Headquarters: Pant Bhawan, Bailey Road, Patna- 800001
- Minister responsible: Nitish Mishra, Minister of Housing and Urban Development
- Agency executive: Vinay Kumar, IAS, Principal Secretary
- Website: pmaa.bihar.gov.in

The Patna Metropolitan Area Authority (PMAA) is the statutory planning and development authority responsible for overseeing urban planning and development within the Patna Metropolitan Region in Bihar, India. The authority functions under the administrative control of the Urban Development and Housing Department of the Government of Bihar.

PMAA is responsible for the preparation and implementation of regional development plans, regulation of land use, and coordination of infrastructure projects across the metropolitan area.

Its jurisdiction extends beyond the municipal limits of Patna and includes adjoining urban and rural areas identified under the Patna Master Plan 2031. While the Patna Municipal Corporation administers civic services within the city of Patna, PMAA oversees metropolitan planning functions for the wider region. Patna Smart City Limited implements projects under the Government of India's Smart Cities Mission within designated areas of the city.

== History ==
The Patna Metropolitan Area Authority was constituted by the Government of Bihar on 11 September 2014 under Section 11 of the Bihar Urban Planning and Development Act, 2012.

The authority succeeded the planning functions previously carried out by the Patna Regional Development Authority (PRDA), which had been established under the Patna Regional Development Authority Act, 1978.

PRDA was dissolved following the enactment of the Bihar Municipal Act, 2007, which repealed the legislation governing regional development authorities in the state.

Between 2007 and 2014, Patna did not have a dedicated metropolitan planning authority. During this period, planning and development functions for the metropolitan area were undertaken by the Urban Development and Housing Department of the Government of Bihar in coordination with local urban bodies and state agencies. Infrastructure projects were implemented by agencies including the Bihar Urban Infrastructure Development Corporation.

The establishment of PMAA provided an institutional framework for coordinated metropolitan planning and implementation of the Patna Master Plan 2031.

== Jurisdiction ==
PMAA exercises planning and development functions within the Patna metropolitan area, which includes Patna and surrounding urban and rural areas identified for future growth and expansion.

The metropolitan area includes Patna Municipal Corporation and adjoining urban local bodies in Patna district, including Danapur, Khagaul, Phulwari Sharif, Fatuha, Maner and other notified areas.

== Functions ==
The functions of PMAA include:

- Preparation and implementation of development plans and zonal plans
- Regulation of land use and development activities
- Approval of layout plans and development schemes
- Formulation and enforcement of building regulations
- Infrastructure planning and coordination
- Promotion of planned urban expansion
- Coordination with local bodies and state agencies

The authority coordinates with agencies including the Patna Municipal Corporation, Bihar Urban Infrastructure Development Corporation and Patna Smart City Limited.

== Institutional framework ==
The urban governance framework of the Patna metropolitan area involves multiple state and local agencies with distinct responsibilities. PMAA coordinates with multiple state and local agencies involved in urban governance and infrastructure development within the metropolitan area. Patna Municipal Corporation is responsible for the provision of municipal services, including sanitation, solid waste management, street lighting and local roads within its jurisdiction. Patna Smart City Limited, a special purpose vehicle incorporated under the Smart Cities Mission, implements selected urban development projects within designated areas of Patna. PMAA performs metropolitan planning functions, including the preparation of development plans, land-use regulation and coordination of infrastructure projects across the wider Patna metropolitan area.

== Patna Master Plan 2031 ==
PMAA is the nodal agency responsible for implementing the Patna Master Plan 2031.

The master plan proposes the development of satellite growth centres in areas such as Bihta, Naubatpur, Punpun, Fatuha and Khusrupur, along with improvements in transport infrastructure, housing, drainage, water supply and environmental management.

Major projects within the metropolitan area include the Patna Metro, expansion of Bihta Airport and the development of regional transport corridors.

== Administration ==
PMAA functions under the Urban Development and Housing Department of the Government of Bihar.

The authority comprises planning, engineering and administrative divisions headed by officials appointed by the state government.
