= Patna Regional Development Authority =

Development Authority in Bihar

- PRDA

Agency overview
- Formed: 1979
- Preceding agency: Patna Improvement Trust
- Dissolved: 2007
- Superseding agency: Patna Metropolitan Area Authority
- Jurisdiction: Patna; Hajipur; Sonepur
- Status: defunt
- Headquarters: 2nd floor, C-Block, Maurya Lok Complex, Patna – 800001
- Parent agency: Patna Municipal Corporation

Patna Regional Development Authority abbreviated to PRDA, was a statuary body of the Government of Bihar responsible for the planning and infrastructure development of the Patna Metropolitan Region (PMR). It was established by the Bihar State Government to oversee and coordinate the region's urban development. Following the enactment of Bihar Municipal Act 2007, it is now merged into Patna Municipal Corporation. Its planning functions were sunsequently assumed by the Patna Metropolitan Area Authority.

== Overview ==
After disbanding Patna Improvement Trust, the PRDA was set up in 1975 and was formed in 1979 under the provision of Patna Regional Development Authority act 1978 for preparation of Regional Plan, Master Plan and Zonal Plan.

== Patna Master Plan ==
In October 2016, Bihar cabinet approved the Patna master plan 2031 which envisages development of Bihta Airport. Bihar government is acquiring 126 acres of land for construction of the new airport. 17.6 km^{2} of area in Dumri Village in Punpun block of Patna (PMR) has been allocated for IT Park.

== Jurisdiction ==
The area of jurisdiction of Patna Regional Development Authority covers an approximately 234.70 Square Kilometers comprising

- Within Patna district: The Patna Urban Agglomeration area which comprises Patna Municipal Corporation Area (PMC), Danapur Cantonment Area, Danapur Nagar Palika Parishad area, Khagaul Nagar Palika Parishad area, Phulwari Sharif Nagar Palika Parishad area. Apart from these it also consists of Fatuha Nagar Parisad area, Maner Nagar Panchayat area and 104 villages.
- Within Vaishali district: Hajipur Nagar Parisad area and 99 villages around Hajipur Nagar Panchayat area.
- Within Saran district: Sonepur Nagar Panchayat Area and 19 villages around Sonepur Nagar Panchayat area.

== See also ==
- Bihar Urban Infrastructure Development Corporation
- Patna Municipal Corporation
- Patna Metropolitan Area Authority
