= Gaighat, Patna =

Gaighat Gaughat
- – Neighbourhood –
- Location in Patna, India
- Coordinates: 25°36′49″N 85°12′11″E
- Country: India
- State: Bihar
- City: Patna

Languages
  - Spoken: Hindi, English, Magadhi, Bengali, Bhojpuri
- Time zone: UTC+5:30 (IST)
- PIN: 800007
- Planning agency: Patna Metropolitan Area Authority
- Civic agency: Patna Municipal Corporation
- Website: patna.nic.in

Gaighat is a neighbourhood of Patna in the eastern state of Bihar in India. It is located on the southern bank of the Ganges River in Patna. The southern flank of Mahatma Gandhi Setu bridge connecting Patna and Hajipur rises from Gaighat in Patna. One end of Pontoon Bridge (Peepapul) connecting Patna and Hajipur over the river Ganges is also located in the area. Gaighat is part of the wider Alamganj area in Patna.

== History ==
Gaighat is an old neighbourhood of Patna and was earlier known as Gaughat. The word Gaighat is made up of two Hindi words Gai (Cow:English or Gau:Sanskrit) and Ghat. It is of historical and religious significance for Hindus and Sikhs. One of the oldest Gurudwaras in the region, Gurdwara Gai Ghat is situated in the area. Sikh Gurus Guru Nanak and Guru Tegh Bahadur visited the area in 15th and 16th Century. It is believed, Guru Tegh Bahadur made the river Ganges come in the form of "Gai" (cow) to a very old saint, Jaitamal, who could not go to the riverbank due to his old age. The neighbourhood was thus named 'Gaighat'.

== Religious significance ==
Gurdwara Gai Ghat is one of the oldest Gurudwaras in Patna. A number of Sikh pilgrims visit the area and Gurudwara all year round. The area is of religious significance to Hindus, who come to banks of river Ganges for holy bath on religious days. Some special days for taking holy dip in the river are Ganga Dussehra, Chhath, Makar Sankranti and Kartik Purnima.

== Transport and connectivity ==
Gaighat Bus Stand is the main bus stand in the area and connects it to other parts of the city and state. Situated at the bank of river Ganges, waterway is also a transportation avenue from the neighbourhood. Gulzarbagh Station is the railway station for the neighbourhood and connects it to many metropolitan cities of India by the Howrah-Delhi Main Line. National Highway 30 (India) passes by the place connecting it to the state capital and other neighbouring places. Situated at the bank of river Ganges waterway is being seen as a good transportation perspective. Rajendra Nagar Terminal is the nearest railways station from Gaighat.

== Police stations ==
Alamganj Thana of Patna Police serve this neighbourhood.

== Post office ==
Gulzarbagh post office services this area. It is situated beside of Bhadraghat. The India post provides facility of speed post in Gulzarbagh post office.

== Institutions ==
- National Inland Navigation Institute
- Government Polytechnic Patna-7
- Bihar Survey Office
- Bihar Judicial Academy
- State Deaf and Dumb (Girls) Middle School
