= Bihta Dry Port =

Inland port in Bihar, India

- Interactive map of Bihta Dry Port
- Location within India
- Native name: ICD Bihta

Location
- Country: India
- Location: Bihta, Patna district, Bihar
- Coordinates: 25°33′28″N 84°52′36″E

Details
- Opened: 21 October 2024
- Operated by: Pristine Magadh Infrastructure Pvt Ltd
- Owned by: Government of Bihar

Statistics
- Website pristinelogistics.com

Bihta Dry Port also known as Bihta Inland Container Depot (ICD Bihta) is the first inland port in the state of Bihar in India. It is located in the Bihta suburb town of the capital city Patna in Bihar.

== History ==
The dry port was inaugurated on 21 October 2024 by the state Industries Minister Nitish Mishra at the Bihta suburb town of the Patna Metropolitan city in Bihar. On the inauguration day, first shipment of 90 containers were shipped to Russia. It was flagged off by the state Industries Minister Nitish Mishra from the newly constructed dry port at Bihta.

== Description ==
Bihta Dry Port or Bihta Inland Container Depot (ICD, Bihta ) has been established to help the exporters and importers of the state for easy customs clearance. It is expected that the ICD Bihta will be helpful for the businessmen of the Bihar state in India to make their presence in the global markets. They will also be able to participate in the competitions of the International market.

ICD, Bihta is presently spread over 7 Acres of land. It is located near Bihta railway station. It is connected to the major gateway coastal ports of Kolkata, Haldia, Visakhapatnam, Nhava Sheva, and Mundra by the Indian railways. The Bihta Dry Port is being run under PPP (public-private partnership) mode by Pristine Magadh Infrastructure Private Limited and Bihar State Industry Department.
