= PMAA =

PMAA may refer to:

- Poly(methacrylic acid), a polymer of methacrylic acid
- Patna Metropolitan Area Authority, an urban planning agency in Patna, India
- Presidential Management Alumni Association, a non-profit related to the US Presidential Management Fellows Program
