= Bakwara =

Bakwara Bakwāra
- Village
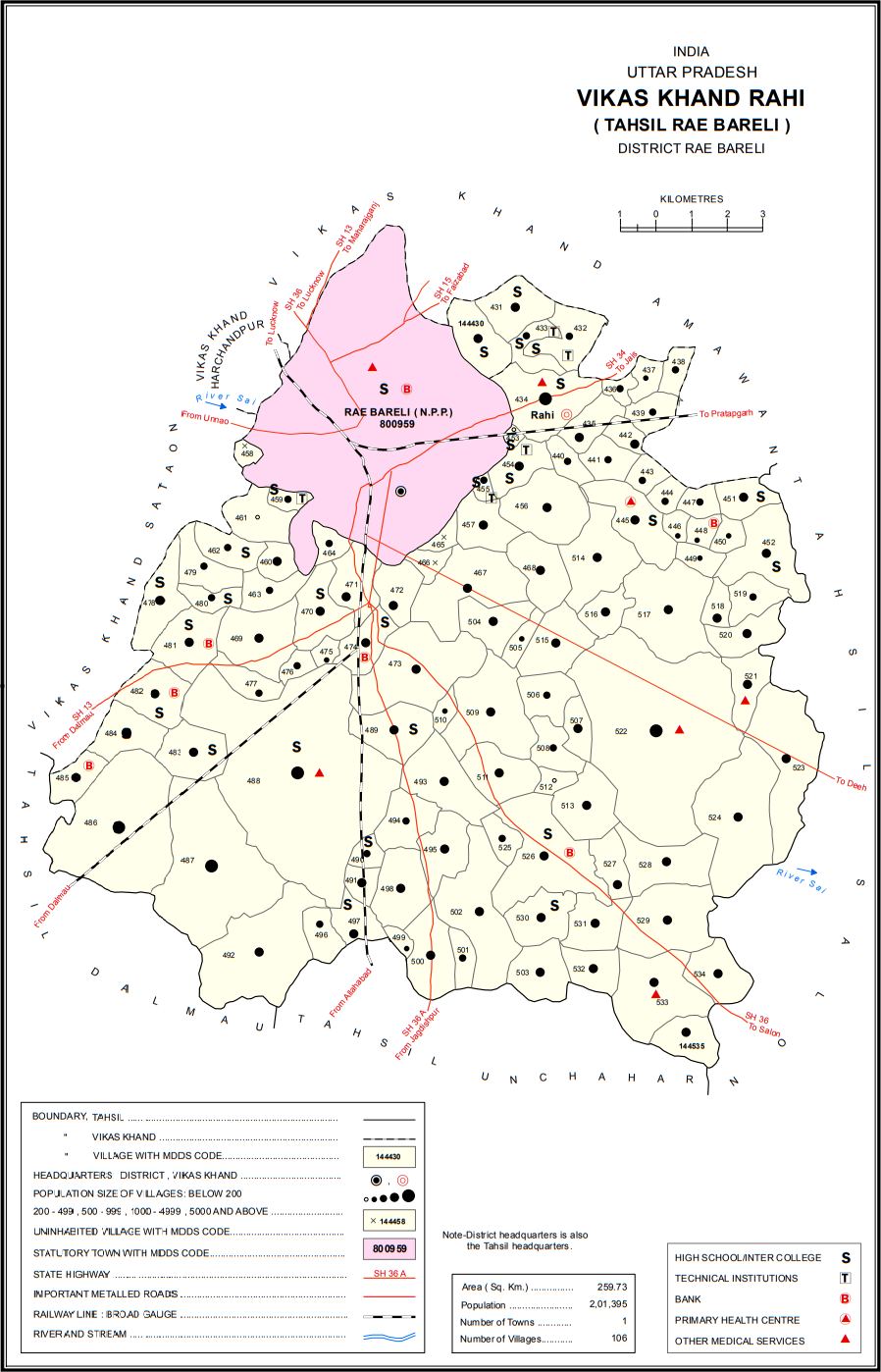
- Map showing Bakwara (#451) in Rahi CD block

- Location in Uttar Pradesh, India
- Coordinates: 26.213882°N 81.351601°E
- Country: India
- State: Uttar Pradesh
- District: Raebareli

Area
  - Total: 1.967 km^{2} (0.759 sq mi)

Population (2011)
  - Total: 1,540
  - Density: 783/km^{2} (2,030/sq mi)

Languages
  - Official: Hindi
- Time zone: UTC+5:30 (IST)
- Vehicle registration: UP-35

Bakwara is a village in Rahi block of Rae Bareli district, Uttar Pradesh, India. It is located 15 km from Rae Bareli, the district headquarters. As of 2011, it has a population of 1,540 people, in 257 households. It has one primary school and no medical facilities. The village hosts a weekly haat but not a permanent market. It belongs to the nyaya panchayat of Rustampur.

The 1951 census recorded Bakwara as comprising 4 hamlets, with a total population of 558 people (305 male and 253 female), in 106 households and 106 physical houses. The area of the village was given as 470 acres. 16 residents were literate, 8 male and 8 female. The village was listed as belonging to the pargana of Rae Bareli North and the thana of Nasirabad.

The 1961 census recorded Bakwara as comprising 4 hamlets, with a total population of 573 people (294 male and 279 female), in 124 households and 120 physical houses. The area of the village was given as 470 acres.

The 1981 census recorded Bakwara as having a population of 821 people, in 155 households, and having an area of 192.64 hectares. The main staple foods were listed as wheat and rice.

The 1991 census recorded Bakwara as having a total population of 1,089 people (534 male and 555 female), in 196 households and 190 physical houses. The area of the village was listed as 197 hectares. Members of the 0-6 age group numbered 255, or 23% of the total; this group was 51% male (129) and 49% female (126). Members of scheduled castes numbered 149, or 14% of the village's total population, while no members of scheduled tribes were recorded. The literacy rate of the village was 28% (238 men and 68 women). 296 people were classified as main workers (260 men and 36 women), while 189 people were classified as marginal workers (5 men and 184 women); the remaining 604 residents were non-workers. The breakdown of main workers by employment category was as follows: 182 cultivators (i.e. people who owned or leased their own land); 58 agricultural labourers (i.e. people who worked someone else's land in return for payment); 1 worker in livestock, forestry, fishing, hunting, plantations, orchards, etc.; 0 in mining and quarrying; 0 household industry workers; 28 workers employed in other manufacturing, processing, service, and repair roles; 2 construction workers; 7 employed in trade and commerce; 0 employed in transport, storage, and communications; and 18 in other services.
