= Danapur–Bihta–Koilwar Elevated Corridor =

Road in Bihar, India

Route information
- Maintained by National Highways Authority of India
- Length: 25.08 km (15.58 mi)

Major junctions
- East end: Danapur, Bihar
- Bihta
- West end: Koilwar, Bihar

Location
- Country: India
- Major cities: Danapur, Bihar

Highway system
- Roads in India; Expressways; National; State; Asian

Danapur-Bihta Elevated Road is an under construction elevated road in Bihar. The 21 km road will be four-lane and is claimed to be the longest elevated road in East India. The road will have a 600-metre-long tunnel for entry of vehicles in the proposed civil enclave at Bihta Air Force Station. The project also proposed construction of ramps at four places- Danapur, Shivala Mor, Bihta airport link and Bihta-Sarmera bypass. The road will connect Patna to Bihta Airport via the Danapur railway station and Shivala Chowk. This elevated road is a crucial part of the broader ‘Patna-Buxar Four-Lane Project’ (NH-922). This entire road, which is extended till Koilwar is 25.08-km long, with 16.65 km in elevated mode.

== History ==
In October 2019, Central Government decided that it will bear construction cost of the elevated road, while the Government of Bihar will bear the land-acquisition cost for the projects. The road project was sanctioned by the Ministry of Road Transport and Highways (MoRTH) as part of the Prime Minister Narendra Modi's package to Bihar, ahead of 2015 Bihar Legislative Assembly election. It will be constructed at the cost of Rs 3,737.51 crore. In September 2023, Ceigall YFC Agency (L-1) was selected as the construction firm to execute the elevated project. Second time, the tender was open and 10 agencies participated in that. Joint Venture of Ceigall India and YFC Projects agency won the bid by proposing the build the road Rs 1969.39 crore.

== Road Extension till Koilwar ==
The elevated road will start near Danapur Divisional Rail Manager (DRM) office and culminate at Koilwar. The road will have four bypasses between Shivala and Bihta-Neora ganj, Painal, Kanhauli and Bishunpura. As part of this project, 4-km-long four-lane road will be constructed from Bihta to Koilwar as part of the project.

Of its total 20 km length, 17 km (11 mi) would be elevated. The elevated portion will terminate at the junction of the Bihta-Sarmera Road near Kanhauli village. From that junction, the road will go up to the Bihta chowk besides connecting the Bihta Airport; it would again be elevated at the Bihta chowk.

== Land Acquisition ==
For the construction of this road, 64.1509 acres of land will be acquired by the district administration. In this, 20 acres of land belongs to Government of Bihar and railways. The process of taking NOC from the Railways is going on near Danapur station. 45 acres of land will be acquired by Government of Bihar in Neora, UsariKhurd, Khedalpura, Painathi, Kothian and Parsa Mauza of Neora and Bihta.

== See also ==
- Loknayak Ganga Path (Patna Marine Drive)
- Patli Path
- Purvanchal Expressway
