= Sonpur International Airport =

Proposed greenfield airport in Saran district, Bihar, India

Sonpur Airport
- IATA: none; ICAO: none

Summary
- Airport type: Public
- Operator: Airports Authority of India
- Serves: Sonepur, Saran Districts of Bihar, India
- Location: Hardia Chawar , Sonepur
- Elevation AMSL: 46 m (151 ft)
- Coordinates: 25°46′41.52″N 085°06′23.66″E

Map
- Location within Bihar Location within India

Runways
Direction	Length		Surface
Direction	m	ft	Surface
11L/29R	1,300	4,265	Unpaved

Sonpur Greenfield International Airport is a proposed greenfield airport in Saran district, Bihar, India. The project is planned in the Sonpur–Dariyapur area of the district and is intended to expand aviation infrastructure in Bihar.

== Background ==
In the Union Budget of India for 2025–2026, presented on 1 February 2025, the Government of India announced plans to facilitate greenfield airports in Bihar to meet the state's future aviation requirements. The announcement also referred to the expansion of Patna Airport and the development of a brownfield airport at Bihta.

The Ministry of Finance's implementation report subsequently identified Sonpur in Saran district, along with Rajgir in Nalanda district and Sultanganj in Bhagalpur district, among the locations for which the Airports Authority of India had conducted pre-feasibility studies.

== Location and land requirements ==
The proposed airport will be constructed in Hardiya Chanwar area, situated between Dariyapur in Chhapra and Sonepur in the Saran district, roughly 30–35 km from Patna City Centre. It will features a dual-runway layout with 4,200-meter runways designed to accommodate large wide-body aircraft, including the Airbus A380. Site clearance has been granted by the Ministry of Civil Aviation. The Bihar government's Civil Aviation Department identified approximately 4,228.61 acres (17.1 km^{2}) for the project.

The proposed site lies in a low-lying landscape that includes agricultural land. The project's detailed planning therefore includes consideration of drainage, environmental impacts and other technical requirements.

The proposed airport should be distinguished from the broader Sonepur Township Special Area, a separate planning initiative that encompasses areas in both Sonpur and Dariyapur community development blocks.

The main objective to build this greenfield airport is to serve as a major North Bihar aviation hub and a high-capacity alternative/gateway to the constrained Jay Prakash Narayan International Airport in Patna. Hardiya Chanwar is a vast, waterlogged agricultural tract. It spans four major blocks of Saran district: Parsa, Dariyapur, Dighwara, and Sonepur. Thousands of acres of land in this area remain submerged in water. While channels such as the Nehura Nala (which drains into the Gandak River) and the Mahdalichak Canal (which drains into the Ganges) exist for water discharge, waterlogging remains a major problem for the local farmers.

== Development ==
In February 2026, the Bihar Cabinet approved the airport project and an estimated ₹1,302.84 crore for land acquisition, according to contemporary news reporting.

The Bihar government's project documents state that the land acquisition and preparation of the detailed project report are part of the project's development process.

On 22 April 2026, the Bihar Civil Aviation Department announced the allocation of work for preparation of the detailed project report for the Sonpur and Sultanganj greenfield airports to RITES.

== See also ==
- List of airports in Bihar
- Patna Airport
- Bihta Airport
