= Fatuha =

Fatuha Fatuwah or Fatuwa
- Town
- Location in Bihar, India
- Coordinates: 25.5167°N 85.3167°E
- Country: India
- State: Bihar
- District: Patna

Population (2011)
  - Total: 50,961

Languages
  - Official: Magahi, Hindi
- Time zone: UTC+5:30 (IST)
- PIN: 803201
- ISO 3166 code: IN-BR
- Vehicle registration: BR 01
- Website: www.patna.nic.in

Fatuha, also spelled Fatuhaa, is a satellite town in the proposed Patna Metropolitan Region, in Patna district in the Indian state of Bihar. Fatuha lies 24 km east of Patna, the capital city of Bihar. Fatuha is an important industrial centre known for its small industries and its handloom industries. The city's name is said to come from its status as a center of textile manufacturing.

== History and culture ==
Fatuha is situated at the confluence of the Ganges and Punpun Rivers. The area is known as Triveni since the river Gandak is believed to unite with these two rivers here earlier. Fatuha is regarded as a very sacred sangam (confluence) in Hindu mythology and is a major pilgrimage and historical centre for Hinduism, Buddhism, Jainism, Islam and Sikhism. Many major religious, mythological and historical figures are said to have visited or passed through Fatuha, and it is part of the Ramayana, Buddhist and Jains circuits. In ancient times, Lord Sri Rama and all his brothers, Guru Vishwamitra, Lord Srikrishna, Bheema, Emperor Jarasandha, Ajatshatru, Udayin, Lord Mahatma Buddha, and Mahavira Jain were said to have visited Fatuha.

Fatuha is said to have hosted Lord Sri Ram with all his brothers as bridegrooms with their groom party while heading for Janakpuri for their marriages to be organised with the daughters of King Janaka and his brother. They crossed the Ganges River at Fatuha to reach the district of Vaishali on the way to the Kingdom of Mithila, the abode of Mother Sita. Fatuha is very important to the Ramayana circuit.

Lord Sri Krishna and Bheema are also said to have passed through Fatuha to kill the first great Magadhan king Jarasandha. Jarasandha was a devout Shaivite and used to visit a very ancient temple dedicated to Lord Shiva at Baikunthpur on the banks of the Ganges River near Fatuha. There is an annual festival at this place on each Mahashivratri and the temple remains vibrant with a large influx of devotees during Shravan Masa as per Vikram calendar. This temple is a great milestone in the history of Shaivism.

A famous temple called Siddhnath is located at the historical Barabar hills in the Jehanabad district of Bihar. This temple, it is said, was established during the Mauryan period as both Chandragupta Maurya and Ashoka the Great, who initially were great champions of Shaivism. The Ganges river water carried from Triveni is the only water which is offered to Lord Shiva at Siddhanath temple.

Fatuha was a centre for the medieval poet Kabir. There is a large Kabir monastery at Fatuha, which runs many welfare programmes for the local people. Prominent among them is the donation of a large tract of land at the heart of the city to establish a college, which is now known as the Sant Kabir Mahant Vidyanand Mahavidyalaya.

In the medieval period, Bakhtiyar Khilji, an aide of Muhammad Ghori, passed through Fatuha to sack and burn the great universities of Nalanda, Odantapuri and Vikramshila in 1193. The places of Bakhtiarpur and Khusropur near Fatuha still bear the names of Bakhtiyar Khilji and his commander-in-chief Khusro. Burning of these great universities by Bakhtiyar Khilji led to a dark age in India and Bihar in particular as all the great libraries of those universities containing the entire great knowledge of India were burned. Since then, Bihar has been struggling very hard to come out of acute illiteracy.

Fatuha also became a centre of Sufi saints in medieval times and was visited by many Muslim rulers and conquerors. There is a very famous Sufi shrine at Kachchi Dargah in Fatuha. Thursdays and Fridays are considered very auspicious. It is like an Ajmer Sarif for the local people where people from all walks of life throng to pay homage to the Sufi saint.

Fatuha was a thriving centre of textile production during the medieval period; a caste called Patwa, experts in the textile industry, was concentrated there. It is said that the entire Patwa community has roots in Fatuha and that the city itself was named Fatwa after the Patwa community. Textile workers still form a very large proportion of the city's population.

== Geography ==
Fatuha is situated at the confluence of the Ganges and Punpun Rivers. The Dhoba and Mahatmain Rivers (principal branch of river Falgu before disappearing in the "Taal" area) border the city on its southern sides. From nearby Fatuha starts the famous 'Taal' area which is known for rabi crops. The soil of Fatuha is fertile as it is drained by multiple rivers including the Ganges and Punpun. All types of crops are grown in abundance. Fatuha is a big producer of vegetables, particularly of onions. It is located in the lower reach of the middle Ganges basin and has a typical humid Monsoon climate.

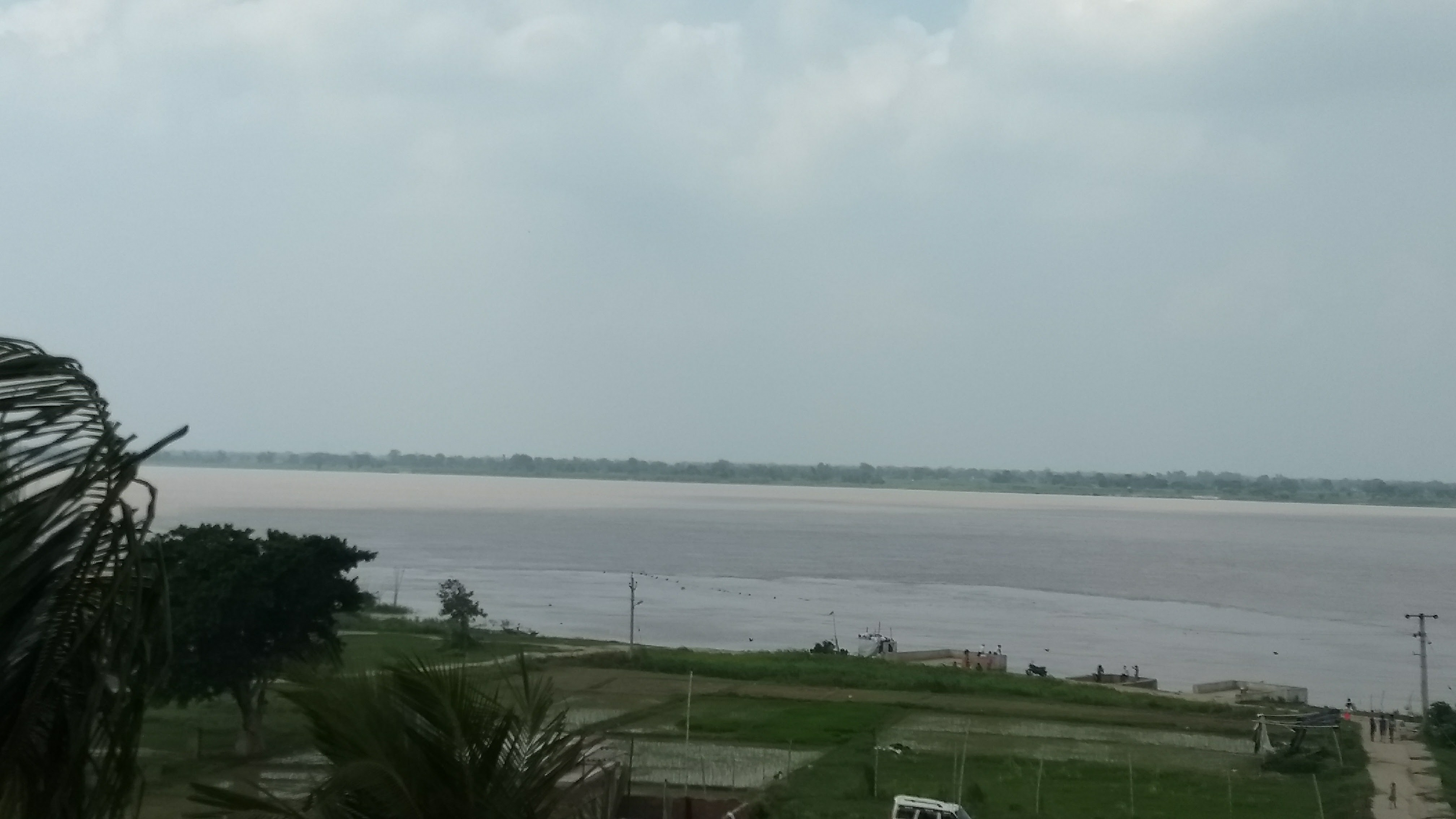
Confluence of river Ganges and Punpun in Fatuha

The national aquatic animal of India, the dolphin, is a very special feature of Fatuha which was seen aplenty here a decade earlier. The dolphin's range formerly spread from Buxar to Bhagalpur in Bihar, but recent illegal fishing has created a great danger to the species.

== Economy ==
Fatuha is a major rural market, catering to the needs of numerous villages which produce all kinds of agrarian and other rural produces like handicrafts, etc.

Fatuha is an important industrial centre of Bihar and produces farm tractors, scooter, and other products in its industrial district. The industrial sector is being revived, and Fatuha now houses an LPG bottling plant of Bharat Petroleum.

== Transport ==
Fatuha is a major road and rail junction. Proximity to the state capital of Patna makes Fatuha an important hub for goods being supplied in and out of Patna.

=== Road ===
Fatuha is well connected by roads to different cities. NH-30 A connects Patna via Fatuha to Nalanda district and beyond. Fatuha thus serves as the gateway of the capital city of Patna to central and southern Bihar. Similarly, NH 30 connects Patna via Fatuha to northeastern India, making Fatuha an eastern gateway of Patna. Fatuha connects to the trans-Ganges district of Vaishali through the Kachchi Dargah-Rustampur link.

=== Rail ===
Fatuha Junction is the railway station for the city of Fatuha. It connects Fatuha with the major cities in India by the Howrah-Delhi Main Line. The Fatuha-Islampur (Nalanda) rail line was also resurrected in 2002 by then-rail minister Sri Nitish Kumar. The line is being further expanded to Natesar to connect with Gaya. Fatuha now has been connected to Rajgir via Daniyawan-Biharsharif. Prime Minister Narendra Modi inaugurated the Fatuha-Daniyawan-Biharsharif-Rajgir railway line.

== Delicacies ==
Fatuha is known for its unique dishes, including Tikri, a sweet dish, and Pantua and Mirjai, a sweet prepared from maida, sugar and vegetable oil.

== Demographics ==
As of the 2011 India census, Fatuha had a population of 50,961 with males constituting 52.9% of the population and females 47.1%. Fatuha has an average literacy rate of 70.2%, which is more than the national average of 59.5%. Male literacy is 78%, whereas female literacy is only 59%. 17% of the population is under 6 years of age.

== Recent developments ==
Fatuha was the largest development block of Bihar until trifurcated into Fatuha, Daniyawan and Khushropur. It was also the first development block with its own website (known as the first e-block of Bihar). Fatuha railway yard in its present renovated shape forms the first inland rail container of Bihar, operated & maintained as such by Concor (a Railway undertaking). Since August 2007, Fatuha has functioned as a police subdivision, including police stations of Didarganj, Fatuha, Khusrupur, Daniyawan and Shahjahanpur. Fatuha lies to the north of the newly laid four lane NH-30 connecting Patna and Bakhtiyarpur. Under the master plan of Patna, Fatuha has been declared as a satellite city. Recently the chief minister of Bihar inaugurated the Sonalika tractor plant under which many agricultural tools and machines will be manufactured. In April 2012, the CM laid the foundation stone of world's second largest leather hub to be built at Fatuha. A bridge across river Ganga to connect Fatuha with north Bihar is also proposed to be built between the villages Kachchi Dargah (Fatuha) and Rustampur (Vaishali district). In January 2011, the first Ganges River police station was inaugurated by the Chief Minister near Maujipur village of Fatuha. Fatuha was once selected for the establishment of a possible IIM type B-school.

== Villages ==
- Govindpur Bajrangbali
- Bankipur Gorakh, Ganjpar
