= Gulzarbagh railway station =

Railway station in Patna, Bihar, India

GULZARBAGH

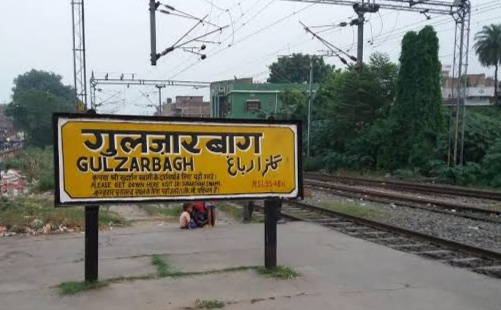

General information
- Location: Gulzarbagh, Patna, Bihar; India
- Coordinates: 25°35′51″N 85°12′14″E
- Elevation: 55 metres (180 ft)
- System: Indian Railways station
- Lines: Howrah–Delhi main line Asansol–Patna section
- Connections: Patna Sahib station, Rajendra Nagar Terminal

Construction
- Structure type: Standard (on-ground station)

Other information
- Status: Functioning
- Station code: GZH
- Zone(s): East Central Railway
- Division(s): Danapur

History
- Former names: East Indian Railway

Services
Preceding station	Indian Railways	Following station
East Central Railway
Rajendra Nagar Terminal towards ?	Asansol–Patna section Towards Islampur, Fatuha	Patna Sahib towards ?
Location
- Location within Patna Location within India Location within Bihar
- Interactive map of Gulzarbagh

Gulzarbagh railway station (station code: GZH), is a railway station in the Danapur division of East Central Railway. It is a part of the Patna railway hub which has five major stations: Patna Junction railway station, Patliputra station, Rajendra Nagar Terminal railway station, Gulzarbagh station, Danapur station and Patna Sahib railway station. Gulzarbagh is connected to metropolitan areas of India, by the Delhi–Kolkata main line via Mugalsarai–Patna route. Gulzarbagh station is located in Gulzarbagh city in Patna district in the Indian state of Bihar. Due to its location on the Howrah–Patna–Mughalsarai main line many Patna, Barauni-bound express trains coming from Howrah, Sealdah stop here.

== Facilities ==
The major facilities available are waiting rooms, computerized reservation facility, vehicle parking. The vehicles are allowed to enter the station premises. The station also has STD/ISD/PCO Telephone booth, toilets, tea stall and book stall.

=== Platforms ===
There platforms 3 platforms at Gulzarbagh railway station. The platforms are interconnected with foot overbridges (FOB).

== Trains ==
Many passenger and express trains serve Gulzarbagh station.

== Nearest airports ==
The nearest airports to Gulzarbagh station are:

1. Lok Nayak Jayaprakash Airport, Patna 12 kilometres (7.5 mi)
2. Gaya Airport 110 kilometres (68 mi)
3. Netaji Subhas Chandra Bose International Airport, Kolkata

== See also ==
- Agam Kuan
