= Gulzarbagh =

- Neighbourhood
- Location in Patna, India
- Coordinates: 25°36′0″N 85°12′0″E
- Country: India
- State: Bihar
- Metro: Patna

Government
  - Body: Patna Municipal Corporation

Languages
  - Spoken: Hindi, Magadhi
- Time zone: UTC+5:30 (IST)
- PIN: 800008

Gulzarbagh is a neighbourhood of Patna in the Bihar state of India. It is located at 25°36'0N 85°12'0E with an altitude of 45 metres (150 feet). It has very much historical importance, especially for Jain religion. First Jain council was held at this place in 300 BCE by Sthulbhadra. Later the place became famous as Kamaldah temple where Jains come every year in large number for blessings.

== Transport ==
Gulzarbagh Station is the railway station for the neighbourhood and connects it to many metropolitan cities of India by the Howrah-Delhi Main Line. National Highway 30 (India) National waterway 01(India) passes by the place connecting it to the state capital and other neighbouring places. Situated at the bank of river Ganga waterway is being seen as a good transportation perspective.

== Institutions in Gulzarbagh ==
- Government Polytechnic Patna-7, Gulzarbagh beside Bhadraghat and near Gaighat Patna
- Bihar Survey Office, Gulzarbagh, Patna-7 beside Bhadraghat and near Gaighat Patna
