= Bihar Urban Infrastructure Development Corporation =

Urban Infrastructure Development in Bihar

Bihar Urban Infrastructure Development Corporation Limited
- Official logo of BUIDCO

Agency overview
- Formed: 16 June 2009
- Jurisdiction: Government of Bihar
- Headquarters: West Boring Canal Road, Rajapul, Patna, 800001
- Minister responsible: Samrat Choudhary, Minister Urban Development & Housing Department
- Agency executives: Santosh Kumar Mall, IAS, Principal Secretary, UDHD; Dharmendra Singh, IAS, Managing Director, BUIDCO; Vivek Kumar Singh, IAS, Chairman, Development Commissioner
- Website: buidco.in buidco.bih.nic.in urban.bih.nic.in

The Bihar Urban Infrastructure Development Corporation Limited (Hindi: बिहार शहरी आधारभूत संरचना विकास निगम लिमिटेड), commonly known as BUIDCO, is the Government of Bihar's primary urban planning and infrastructure development agency. Established on 16 June 2009 under the Companies Act, 1956, BUIDCO functions as an apex body for the planning, coordination, and implementation of urban development projects across the state. The corporation works under the Urban Development & Housing Department, Government of Bihar.

BUIDCO is responsible for accelerating urban infrastructure development in Bihar, focusing on sectors such as water supply, sewerage, urban transport, housing, and solid waste management, with the objective of transforming the state's cities into modern, well-equipped urban centres through systematic planning and execution.

== Key functions and mandate ==
BUIDCO serves as the apex body for urban planning and execution, responsible for planning, coordinating, and implementing infrastructure projects in Bihar's rapidly urbanising areas. The corporation undertakes comprehensive urban development projects, including 24×7 water supply systems, sewerage networks, stormwater drainage, solid waste management, urban transport, affordable housing, riverfront development, street lighting, markets, and urban beautification initiatives.

== See also ==
- Patna Regional Development Authority
- Muzaffarpur Municipal Corporation
- Patna Municipal Corporation
- [[Infrastructure Development Authority Bihar]]
