= Gurdwara Gai Ghat =

Gurdwara in Bihar, India

- Location in Bihar

Religion
- Affiliation: Sikhism
- District: Patna
- Deity: Guru

Location
- Location: Patna
- State: Bihar
- Country: India
- Coordinates: 25°36′28.77″N 85°10′3.06″E

Architecture
- Completed: 15th-16th Century

Gurdwara Pahila Bara, commonly known as Gurdwara Gai Ghat, is a holy Gurdwara of Sikh religion. It is located in the city of Patna, Bihar, India and dedicated to Guru Nanak Dev. The Gurdwara is part of "Guru Circuit" - A Government of Bihar initiative connecting important Sikh religious destinations in Bihar to attract more pilgrims.

== History ==
The building where Gurdwara is located was initially Bhagat Jaitamal's house. Jaitamal, a pious man, confectioner by trade, became the Guru's follower and later converted his house into a Dharamshala. It was sanctified first by Guru Nanak in 1509 A.D. and later by Guru Tegh Bahadur along with his family in 1666 A.D. It is believed, Guru Tegh Bahadur made the river Ganges come in the form of "Gai" (cow) to Jaitamal, who could not go to the riverbank due to his old age. The Gurdwara was thus named 'Gurdwara Gaighat'.

== Location ==
Gurdwara Pahila Bara is a historical Sikh shrine situated at Gaighat in the Alamganj area of Patna. It is the oldest Gurdwara in this region. A new building consisting of a spacious square hall with the sanctum in the middle was constructed in the year 1980. It is about 4 kilometers from Takht Sri Patna Sahib, on the Ashok Raj Path.

== Importance ==
In addition to being a religious site, the following things of historical importance are preserved in the Gurdwara:

- Rabab of Bhai (Brother) Mardana.
- Chakki (Grind stone) of Mata Gujri
- Tree, where Guru Tegh Bahadur tied his horse.
- Thara Saheb, a place where Guru Tegh Bahadur used to sit.
- Tham Sahib, wooden pillars.

== See also ==
- Akal Takht
- Takht Sri Keshgarh Sahib
- Takht Sri Damdama Sahib
- Takht Sri Hazur Sahib
