= Punpun =

- Satellite Town
- Location in Bihar, India
- Coordinates: 25.48°N 85.12°E
- Country: India
- State: Bihar
- Metropolis: Patna Metropolitan Region
- District: Patna

Government
  - Type: Nagar panchayat
  - Body: Nagar Panchayat Punpun
- Elevation: 60 m (200 ft)

Population (2011)
  - Total: 116,394

Languages
  - Spoken: Magahi, Hindi
- Time zone: UTC+5:30 (IST)
- PIN: 804453
- Vehicle registration: BR-01
- Planning agency: Patna Metropolitan Area Authority
- Website: punpun.municipalcouncil.net

Punpun is a satellite town in the Patna Metropolitan Region, Patna district, in the Indian state of Bihar.

== Geography ==
It is located 10 km south of Patna. The name Punpun comes from the nearby Punpun River, a tributary of the Ganges River, on whose bank the village has flourished. Many towns such as Sigori are located on the banks of the river.

17.6 square kilometers in Dumri Village, in the Punpun block of Patna (PMR), have been allocated for an Information Technology Park. Punpun railway station is connected by rail and Road (SH 78), (NH 83).

== History ==
Mata Seeta (Mother Seeta) spent time near Punpun village. Pind Daan Gaya and Punpun are the most important and auspicious places in Hindu Dharma. Every year, Hindus from Nepal and India go there to observe Śrāddha, or Pind Daan. The first Pind Daan was done in Punpun.

== Education ==
In Punpun, the S.M.D. College and Subodh Kumar Mahila College provide education up until the post-graduate level. A 10+2 level government school for boys and girls is present.

== Economy ==
The organizations of AIIMS and IITP are located within 10 kilometers.

Punpun is developing into a business hub, as many small companies invested in the area. Punpun has a thriving scene of self-employment cooperatives with communities that provide jobs.

== Sports ==
Many different high school campus grounds, along with the Gandhi Maidan historical site and S.M.D. College grounds, serve as playgrounds. Cricket is popular.

== Gallery ==
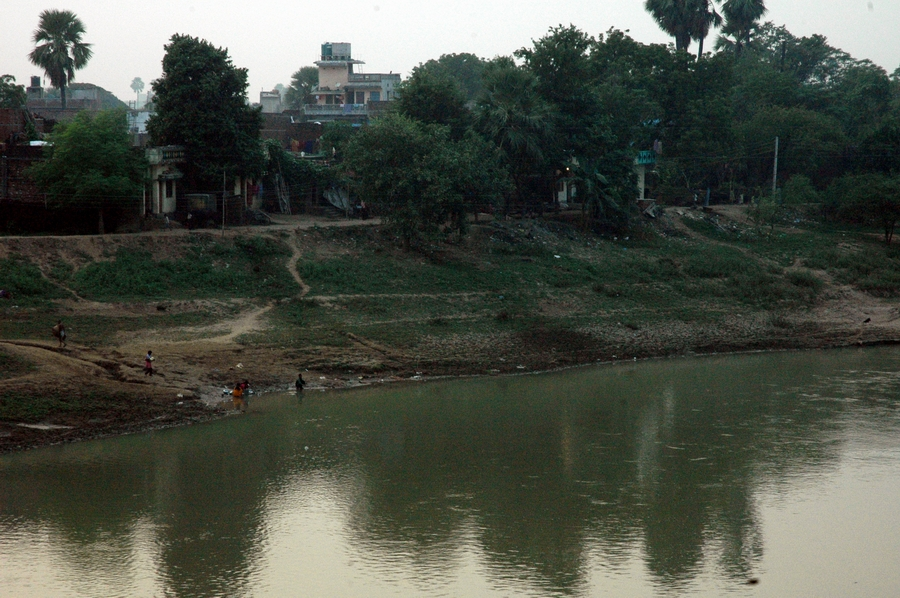
Punpun Ghat

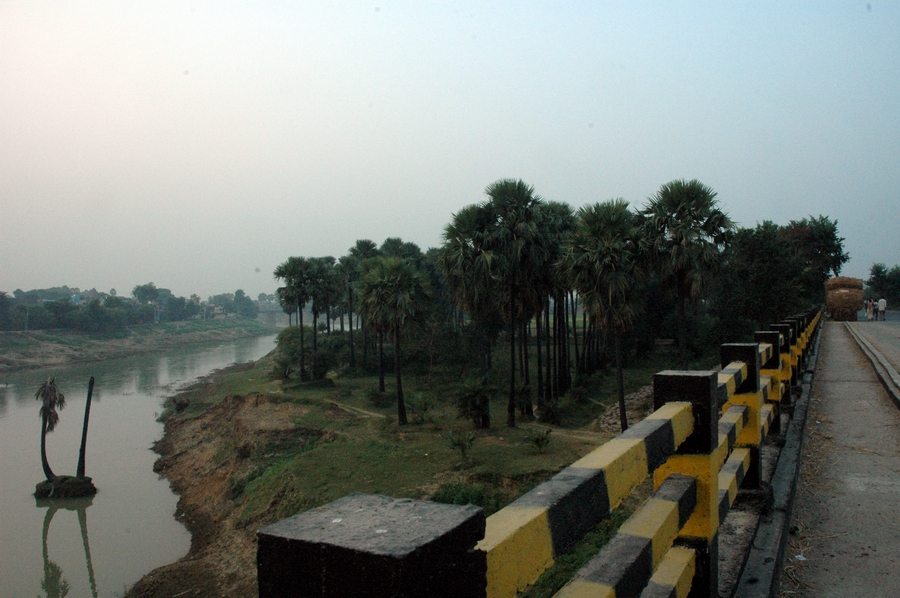
Road bridge

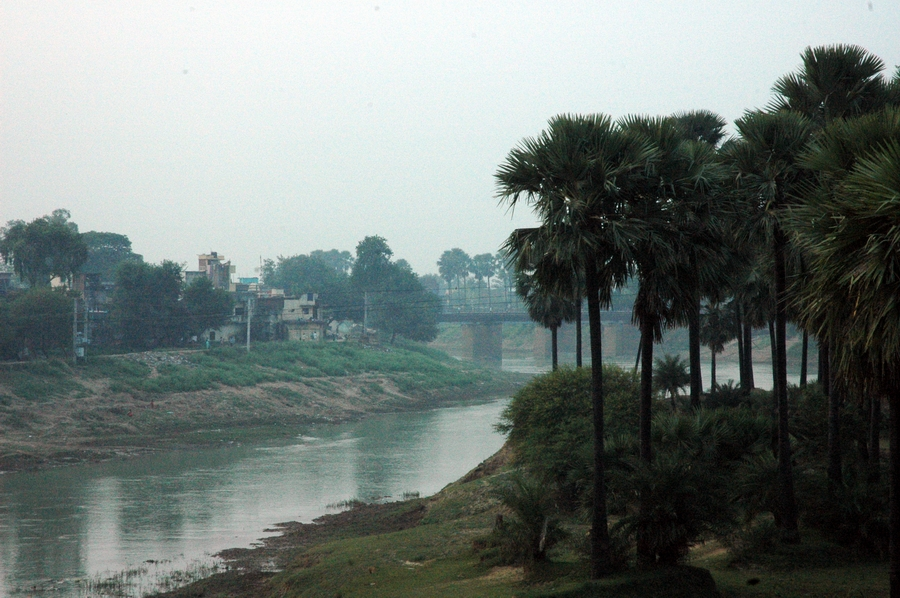
Railway bridge
