= Maurya Lok =

Maurya Lok Complex
- मौर्य लोक
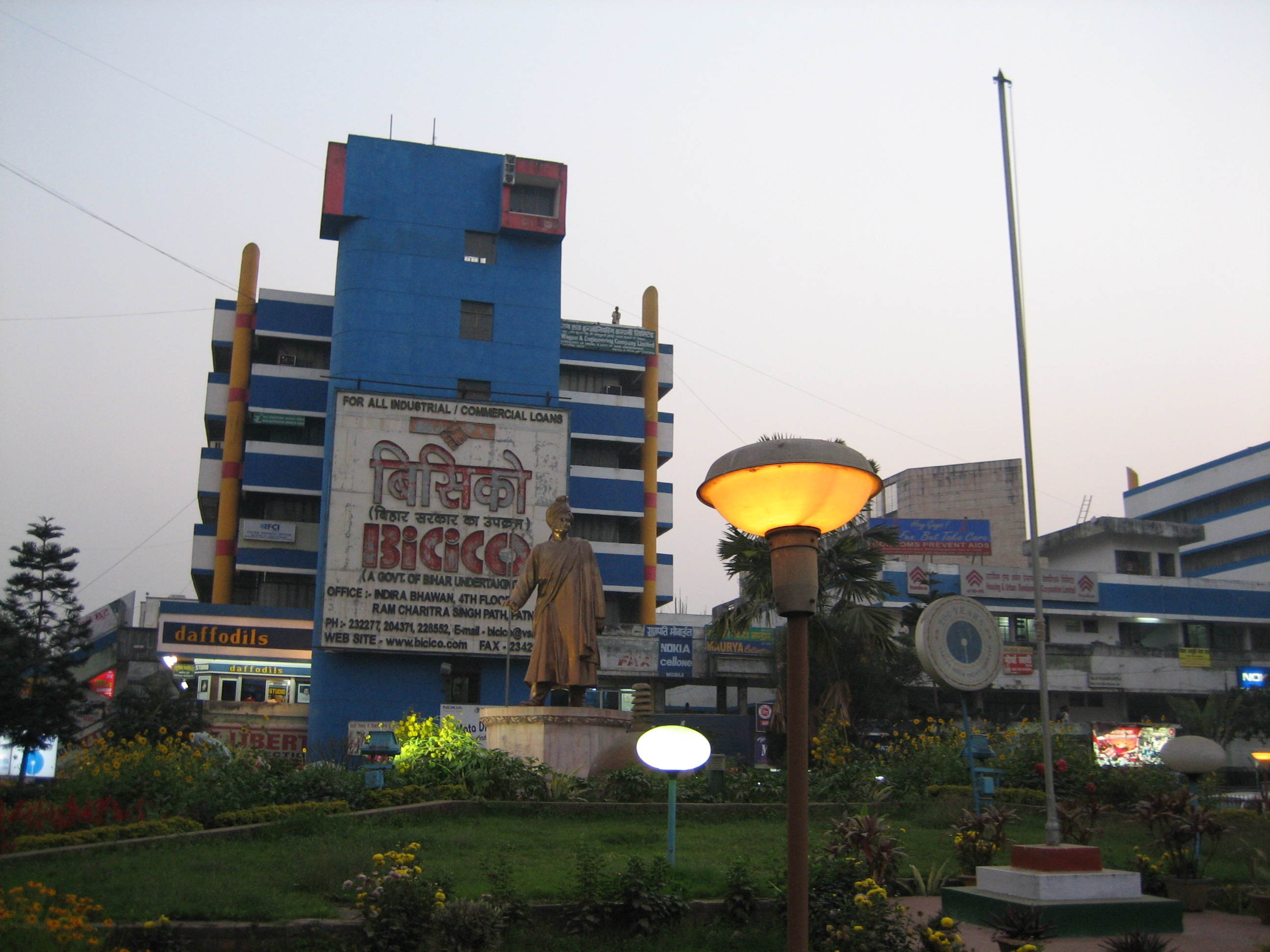
- Maurya Lok in 2008

- Location within Patna

General information
- Location: Patna, Bihar, India
- Coordinates: 25°36′34″N 85°8′4″E
- Inaugurated: 29 February 1984
- Owner: Patna Municipal Corporation

Other information
- Parking: available

Maurya Lok Complex or Maurya Lok is one of the oldest and major business districts and shopping areas of Patna, India. It contains shopping complexes, restaurants and many government offices. It is controlled by Patna Municipal Corporation. It is considered as one of the earliest shopping complex of Patna and it was established by Sumitra Devi, the first women cabinet minister of Bihar.

== See also ==
- Frazer Road
- Bailey Road
