= Bihta Air Force Station =

Indian Air Force base in Bihar

Air Force Station, Bihta

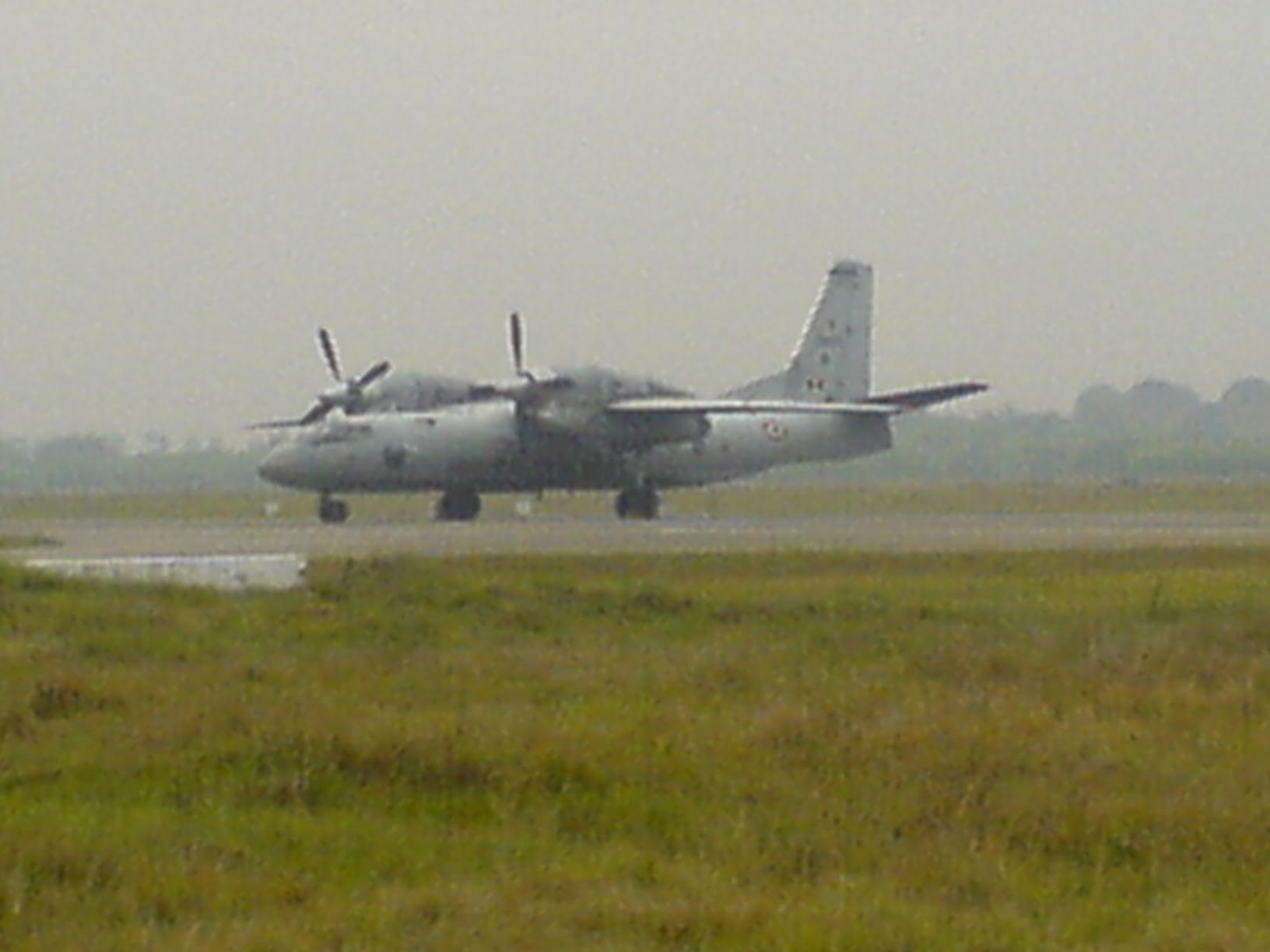
- IATA: none; ICAO: none

Summary
- Airport type: Military
- Operator: Indian Air Force
- Location: Bihta
- Elevation AMSL: 194 ft (59 m)
- Coordinates: 25°35′27″N 84°53′00″E

Map
- Location of airport in India Bihta Air Force Station (India)

Runways
Direction	Length		Surface
Direction	m	ft	Surface
10/28	2,500	8,202	Asphalt

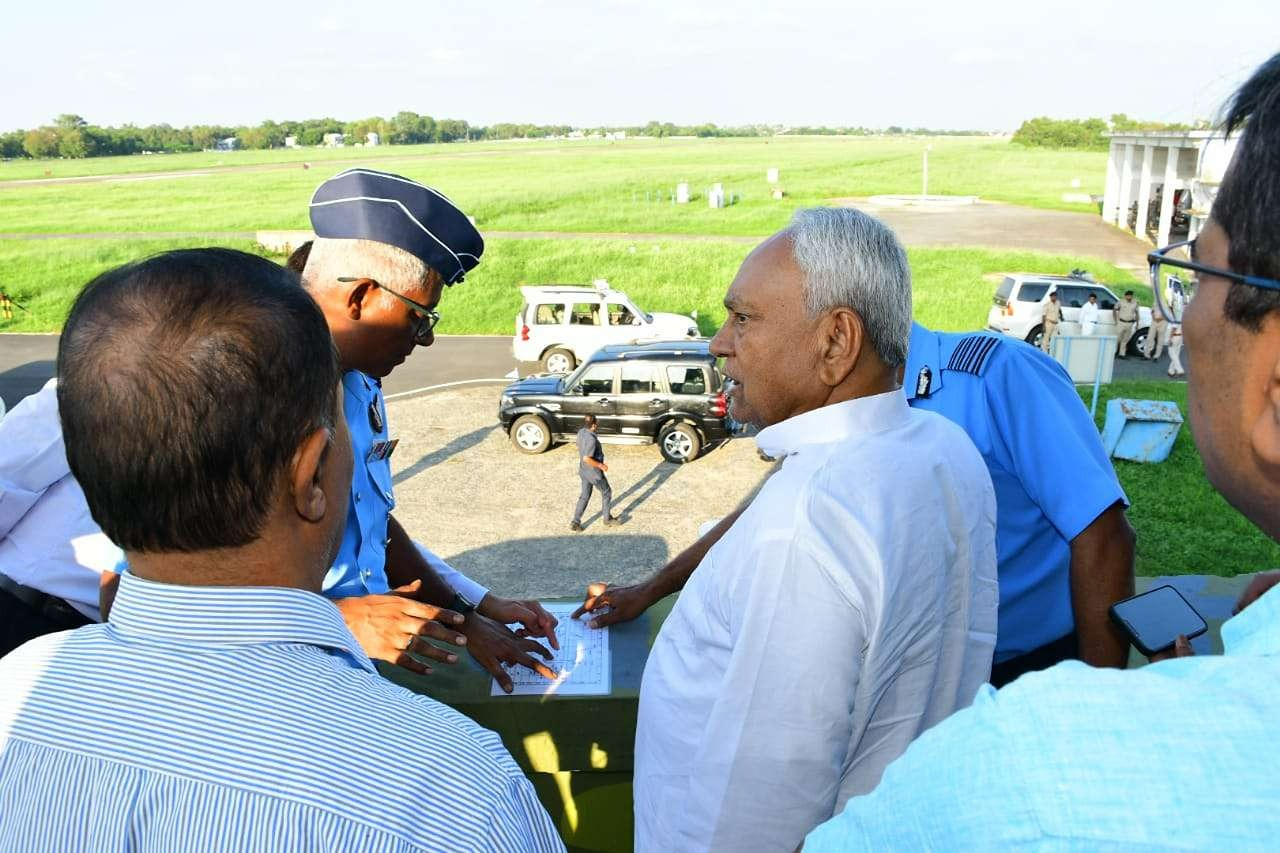
Nitish Kumar inspecting Bihta Air Force Station and the site for construction of Bihta International Airport in 2024

The Bihta Air Force Station is an Indian Air Force (IAF) base in Bihta in the state of Bihar, India. The military airfield lies 40 kilometres (20 mi) southwest of the state capital, Patna, and is spread over an area of around 900 acres (360 ha).

Prime Minister Narendra Modi laid the foundation stone for a civil enclave at the air base on 29 May 2025.

== History ==
During the Second World War, the British Army used Bihta airfield as a base for assembling and test-flying American-manufactured Waco Hadrian combat gliders, as preparations were made for operations by the 44th Airborne Division of the Indian Army against Japanese-held Singapore, Thailand and Netherlands East Indies (now Indonesia) in the South-East Asian theatre.

No. 6 Care & Maintenance Unit of the IAF has been operational at the airfield since 1964, when it was first raised. The unit moved briefly to Panagarh between July 1971 and July 1972 and to Phaphmau between August 1972 and May 1974.

=== New civil airport ===
In 2016, the Airport Authority of India (AAI) proposed to develop a civil enclave at the Bihta airbase to serve as a second airport for Patna. The Indian Air Force gave its consent in April 2016 for commercial flight operations from Bihta as a medium-term measure for development of air operations from Patna. AAI had earlier estimated a requirement of 600 acres (240 ha) of land for the first Phase and another 790 acres (320 ha) for the second Phase to replace the existing Jayprakash Narayan International Airport in Patna.

In October 2016, the Bihar cabinet approved the Patna master plan for 2031 which envisaged development of a new airport at Bihta. The cabinet approved a budget of Rs 260 crore for the acquisition of 126 acres (51.0 ha) for the project. To provide the land needed—99 acres (40 ha) in Vishambhar and 27 acres (11 ha) in Kultupur—property from about 400 landowners was acquired for the new airport in 2017. AAI shortlisted Delhi-based Synergy Consultants in December 2018 to design the terminal building. AAI and the State Government approved the terminal design in July 2019. The Airport Authority had proposed the transfer of 156 acres (63 ha) of land to the state government, apart from the parcel which the state government is to transfer for the terminal and other facilities, so that the length of the runway could be increased to 12,000 feet (3,660 m). Preparatory activities, including soil testing, began in April 2025, following the allocation of the remaining eight acres of land by the state government on March, completing the total 126-acre (51 ha) site required for the project. The Airports Authority of India (AAI) awarded the ₹459.99 crore contract in February 2025, to a joint venture between Russian and Indian firms.

A greenfield airport has been announced for Sonepur, located approximately 55 km from Bihta, to be ready by 2026. Meanwhile, ₹1,200 crore has been allocated for the construction of a new terminal building at Patna Airport, situated 30 km from Bihta. Due to these two major alternatives, the likelihood of operating flights to international destinations from Bihta has diminished. According to the authorities, plans for Bihta are now being scaled back to accommodate only smaller-scale operations, rather than a full-fledged airport with a large terminal.

==== Project features ====
Of the 126 acres (51 ha) of land acquired by the State Government near Bihta airbase, 108 acres (44 ha) will be used by AAI to build the civil enclave while the remaining 18 acres (7 ha) will be used by the State Government for development of amenities, including a VIP lounge, a hotel and a hangar. The 20-kilometre (12 mi) long four-lane Danapur-Bihta Elevated Road, to be built at a cost of around Rs 2,000 crore, will connect the airport with Patna.

The Bihta terminal design draws architectural inspiration from the Mauryan and Gupta eras, as well as Nalanda and Vikramashila. Designed for a 5-star GRIHA rating, it incorporates sustainable infrastructure including a sewage treatment plant for recycled water usage. The terminal building of the civil enclave will have the capacity to handle up to 5 million passengers per annum and can be increased to 10 million per annum as required. It will have two levels, with the ground floor for arrivals and first floor for the departure of passengers. The terminal will cover 68,000 m^{2} (6.8 ha) and will feature 64 check-in counters, 16 self-check-in kiosks, 10 Automatic Tray Retrieval Systems (ATRS), and five aerobridges. The project is estimated to cost around ₹1,413 crore.

The government has also acquired the land needed to extend the runway by almost 50% to a length of 12,000 feet (3,660 m). This will allow large aircraft such as the Boeing 777 and Airbus A380 to operate from the airport. In addition, an advanced category-II Instrument Landing System (ILS) will be installed at the new airport so that flights can land there at a visibility as low as 350 m.

== See also ==
- List of Indian Air Force bases
