= Patwa =

Hindu caste

Regions with significant populations
- India

Languages
- Hindi

Patwa is a Hindu caste traditionally occupied in cloth-weaving, jewelry-making, and thread work.

== History ==
The Patwa are an endogamous community and follow the principle of gotra exogamy. They are Hindu and worship the goddess Bhagwati and Jagdamba.

== Present circumstances ==
The Patwa are involved in selling women's decorative articles like earrings, necklaces, and cosmetics. They also deal in small household items, such as hand fans made of palm. The community was traditionally associated with threading of beads and binding together of silver and gold threads, while others have expanded into other businesses. They are found all over India, mainly in Maharashtra, Goa, Delhi, Madhya Pradesh, Uttar Pradesh, and South India.

In Bihar, the community Tanti is a similar caste. The Tanti have the gotras Nag, Sal, Sandal, and Kashyap. The Patwa and Tanti are found mainly in the districts of Nalanda, Gaya, Bhagalpur, Nawada, and Patna. Their main gotras include the Gorahia, Chero, Ghatwar, Chakata, Supait, Bhor, Pancohia, Dargohi, Laheda, and Rankut, and the Patwa are found all over Bihar. The Patwa of Bihar is now mainly power-loom operators, while others have expanded into other businesses. The Patwa of Bihar have a statewide caste association, the Patwa Jati Sudhar Samiti.

Raja Man Singh, one of the Navaratan of Akbar, shifted Patwa from Rajasthan to Gaya, Bihar and settled them on the other side to Vishnu Pad Temple, of Phalgu River. According to Hindu mythology, in Pind Daan (a custom dedicated to the worship of ancestors) it is mandatory to offer a piece of cloth in the worshipping. To meet this demand, Raja Mansingh shifted them, and thus the colony of Patwa is known as Manpur, dedicated to Raja Mansingh. Jewellary and style of temples are some proof which can link Gaya's Patwa connection to Rajasthan. In the modern day, the Patwas community in Mumbai numbers more than 500,000. Patwa is part of the Shudra community.
