= Patna Metropolitan Region =

Coordinates: 25.6110°N 85.1440°E

- Interactive map of Patna Metropolitan Region
- Country: India
- State: Bihar
- District: Patna
- Major Urban areas: Patna; Danapur; Khagaul; Phulwari Sharif

Area
  - Urban: 600 km^{2} (230 sq mi)
  - Metro: 1,167.04 km^{2} (450.60 sq mi)

Population (2011)
  - Metro: 3,874,000 (estimated)
- Website: https://nagarseva.bihar.gov.in/pmaa/CitizenHome.html

Patna Metropolitan Region is an official definition of the metropolitan area surrounding the Bihar capital city Patna in India. It is also known as the Patna metropolitan area, or Patna planning area. It consists of one municipal corporation and five municipal councils of Patna district. The entire region has an estimated population (as of 2021) of 3,874,000 over an area of 1,167.04 km². The Government of Bihar notified this area on 13 August 2014, replacing PRDA area, which included Hajipur in Vaishali district and Sonpur in Saran district.

In October 2016, Bihar cabinet approved the Patna master plan 2031 which envisages development of Bihta Airport. Bihar government is acquiring 126 acres of land for construction of the new airport. 17.6 km^{2} of area in Dumri Village in Punpun block of Patna Metropolitan Region has been allocated for IT Park.

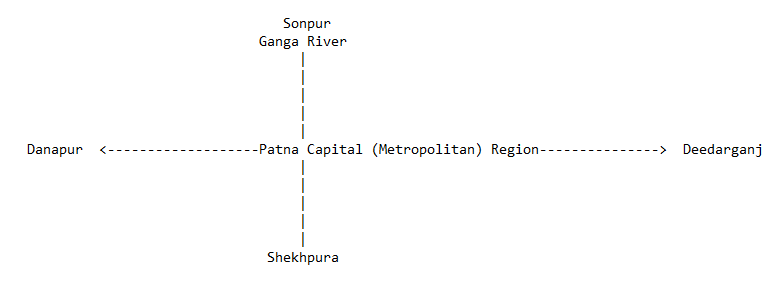
Patna metropolitan Limits
