= Rustampur =

- Village
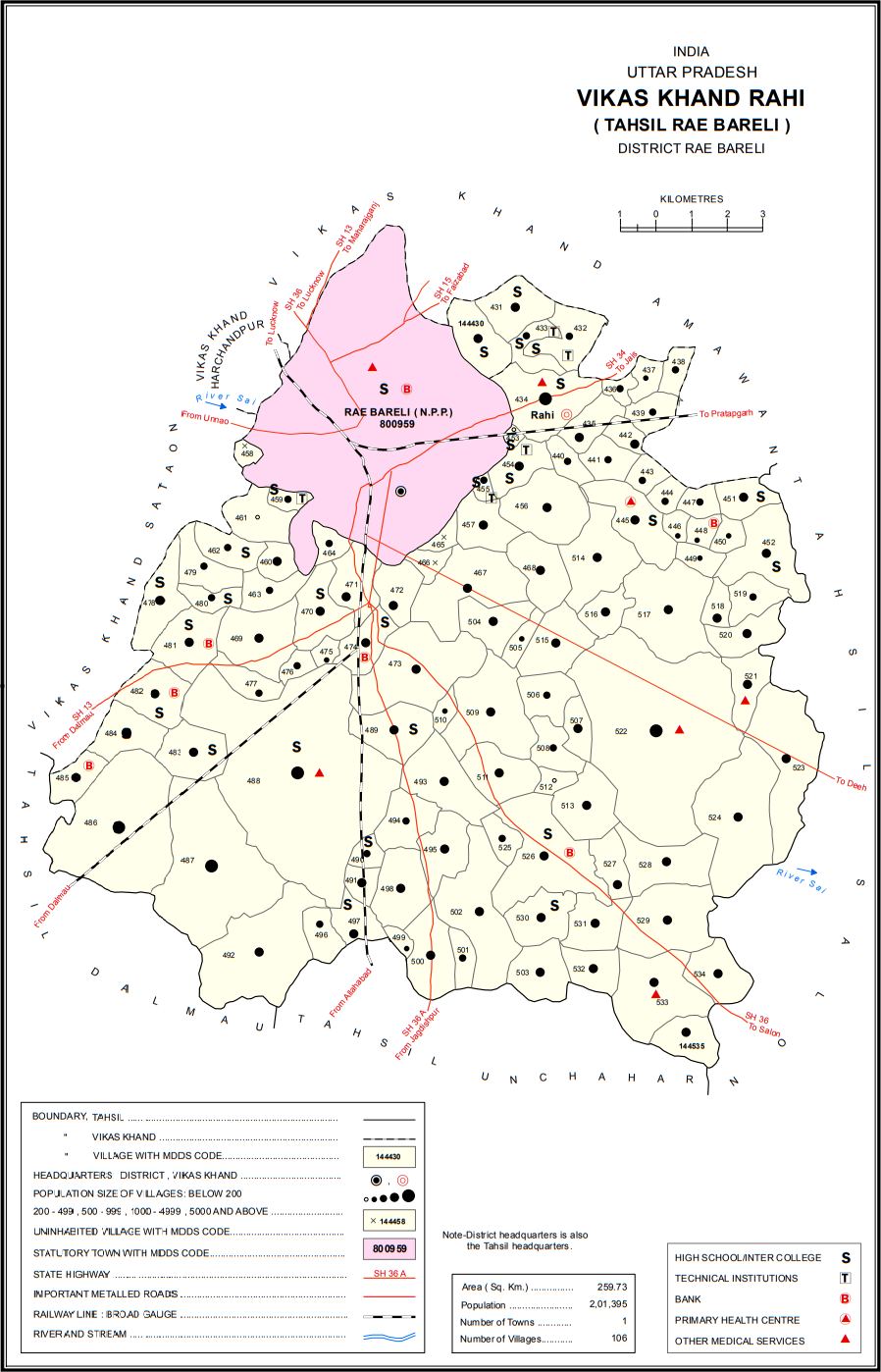
- Map showing Rustampur (#445) in Rahi CD block

- Location in Uttar Pradesh, India
- Coordinates: 26.20824°N 81.323046°E
- Country: India
- State: Uttar Pradesh
- District: Raebareli

Area
  - Total: 3.236 km^{2} (1.249 sq mi)

Population (2011)
  - Total: 4,546
  - Density: 1,405/km^{2} (3,638/sq mi)

Languages
  - Official: Hindi
- Time zone: UTC+5:30 (IST)
- Vehicle registration: UP-35

Rustampur is a village in Rahi block of Rae Bareli district, Uttar Pradesh, India. It is located 7 km from Rae Bareli, the district headquarters. As of 2011, it has a total population of 4,546 people, in 843 households. It has one primary school and one primary health centre. It serves as the headquarters of a nyaya panchayat which also includes 12 other villages.

Rustampur hosts a Shivratri festival dedicated to the worship of Shiva on Phalguna Badi 13. Vendors bring toys, sweets, and various everyday items to sell at the festival. The village also hosts a haat twice per week, on Wednesdays and Saturdays, and which mostly involves trade in cattle and leather goods.

The 1951 census recorded Rustampur as comprising 14 hamlets, with a total population of 1,505 people (768 male and 737 female), in 321 households and 236 physical houses. The area of the village was given as 791 acres. 98 residents were literate, 95 male and 3 female. The village was listed as belonging to the pargana of Rae Bareli North and the thana of Kotwali. There was a primary school in Rustampur at that point with an attendance of 202 students as of 1 January 1951.

The 1961 census recorded Rustampur as comprising 14 hamlets, with a total population of 1,760 people (884 male and 876 female), in 363 households and 357 physical houses. The area of the village was given as 791 acres. Average attendance of the Shivratri festival was about 500 people, and attendance for the twice-weekly haat was about 600.

The 1981 census recorded Rustampur as having a population of 2,615 people, in 485 households, and having an area of 322.55 hectares. The main staple foods were listed as wheat and rice.

The 1991 census recorded Rustampur as having a total population of 2,999 people (1,611 male and 1,388 female), in 578 households and 567 physical houses. The area of the village was listed as 326 hectares. Members of the 0-6 age group numbered 528, or 18% of the total; this group was 54% male (285) and 46% female (243). Members of scheduled castes numbered 857, or 28.5% of the village's total population, while no members of scheduled tribes were recorded. The literacy rate of the village was 28% (659 men and 188 women). 1,103 people were classified as main workers (861 men and 242 women), while 4 people were classified as marginal workers (all women); the remaining 1,892 residents were non-workers. The breakdown of main workers by employment category was as follows: 730 cultivators (i.e. people who owned or leased their own land); 220 agricultural labourers (i.e. people who worked someone else's land in return for payment); 6 workers in livestock, forestry, fishing, hunting, plantations, orchards, etc.; 0 in mining and quarrying; 0 household industry workers; 29 workers employed in other manufacturing, processing, service, and repair roles; 20 construction workers; 41 employed in trade and commerce; 11 employed in transport, storage, and communications; and 46 in other services.
