= Bihta =

Town in Bihar, India

- City
- Location in Bihar, India
- Coordinates: 25°33′43″N 84°52′12″E
- Country: India
- State: Bihar
- Region: Magadh
- District: Patna

Government
  - Type: Nagar Parishad
  - MLA: Bhai Virendra
  - Member of Parliament: Misa Bharti

Area
  - Total: 46 km^{2} (18 sq mi)
- Elevation: 38 m (125 ft)

Population (2016)
  - Total: 617,427

Languages
  - Official: Hindi, Magadhi
- Time zone: UTC+5:30 (IST)
- PIN: 801103
- Telephone code: +91-6115
- ISO 3166 code: IN-BR
- Vehicle registration: BR-01
- Sex ratio: 1000/899 ♂/♀
- Climate: ETh (Köppen)
- Precipitation: 1,000 millimetres (39 in)

Bihta is a town and block under Danapur Tehsil in Patna district in the Indian state of Bihar. Bihta is part of Maner assembly constituency under the Pataliputra Lok Sabha. It is located around 30 km (19 mi) west of Patna. Bihta is also an upcoming satellite town of Patna. The IIT Patna is around 3.5 km (2.2 mi) from Bihta railway station.

== Geography ==
Bihta is 35 kilometres (22 mi) west of Patna and is an hourlong drive from the capital. It is the strategic location named as greater Patna and many real estate companies are investing in the region. Bihta has a famous old temple named Van Devi at Kanchanpur, and a Shiv temple: Baba Biteshwar Nath in Gultera Bazar. There is a 220/132/33 KV Power Grid substation in Dumri in Bihta, where commercial operation started in April 2019. There is a dry port south of the railway station and an oil depot, both with rail connectivity. A 20 km (12 mi) long four-lane elevated road connecting Bihta with Danapur and Shivala is being constructed at a cost of around ₹2,000 crore.

== Educational institutes ==
IIT Patna's campus is located within the parameters of Amhara and Dilawarpur villages in Bihta block, on a 501-acre (203 ha) site. Bihar government allotted 100 acres (40 ha) of land at Amhara village in Bihta to NIT Patna by 2013.

An Employees State Insurance Corporation (ESIC) medical college and 500-bed hospital was built in Bihta on 25-acre (10 ha) in September 2009. It was inaugurated on 7 July 2018.

Union minister Kapil Sibal on 3 June 2013 laid the foundation stone of the permanent campus of National Institute of Electronics & Information Technology (NIELIT) at Bihta.

== International Airport ==
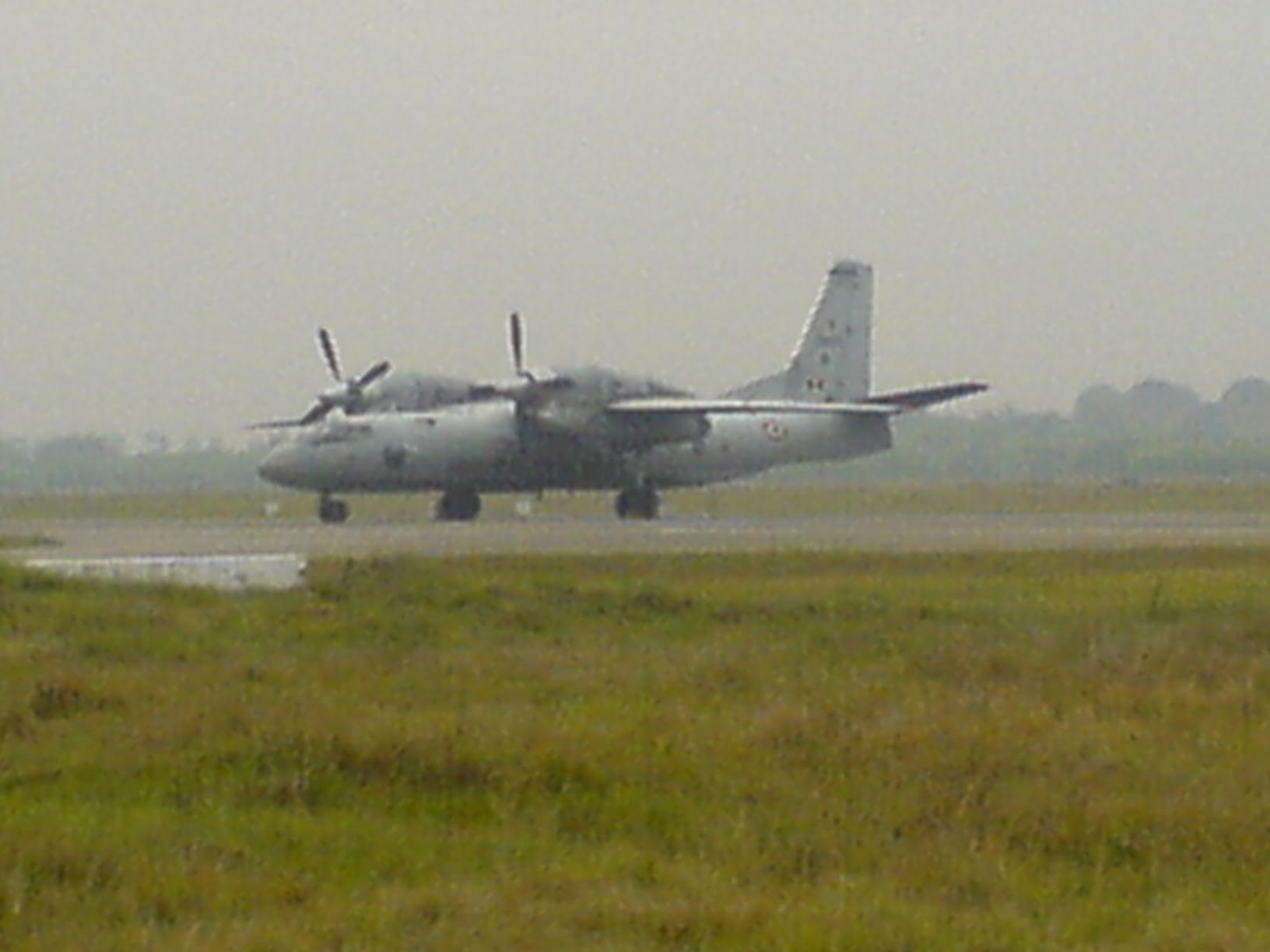
Bihta Air Force Station

Bihta has one airforce base station. The length of the existing runway at Bihta airbase was 9,000 feet (2,700 m). Airports Authority of India has planned to develop Bihta airport for international operations. Airport Authority had proposed 156 acres (63 ha) of land to the state government, apart from 128 acres (52 ha) which state government is to transfer, so that length of the runway could be increased to 12,000 feet (3,700 m), in order to install an advanced category-II Instrument Landing System (ILS) at the new airport so that flights could land there at a visibility as low as 350 m (1,150 ft). Boeing 747 require 12,000 feet of long runways to land.

In October 2016, Bihar cabinet approved the Patna master plan 2031 which envisions development of a new airport at Bihta. Bihar government is acquiring 126 acres (51 ha) of land for construction of the new airport. Bihar cabinet approved a budget of ₹260 crore for the acquisition of 126 acres for Bihta airport which will be completed by October 2019. Of the 126 acres, 99 acres (40 ha) in Vishambhar and 27 acres (11 ha) in Kultupur localities have been acquired from approximately 400 land owners. An elevated expressway from Saguna Mor to Bihta is going to be constructed. Of the 126 acres of acquired land for Bihta airport, 108 acres (44 ha) will be utilised for development of a civil enclave and the remaining 18 acres for development of amenities, including a VIP lounge, a hotel and a hangar.

An 18.5 km (11.5 mi) four-lane semi-elevated road between the proposed Bihta airbase and Danapur railway station is being constructed at the expenditure of ₹ 1400 crore. National Highways Authority of India (NHAI) will construct 13.5 km elevated four-lane road from Bihta to Shivala, while the remaining 5 km stretch from Shivala to Danapur station will be constructed by Bihar RCD. Apart from Danapur-Shivala-Bihta road, Bihta will be connected by two more four-lane roads: Patna-Buxar NH-30 and Bihta-Sarmera SH-78.

== Real estate boom ==
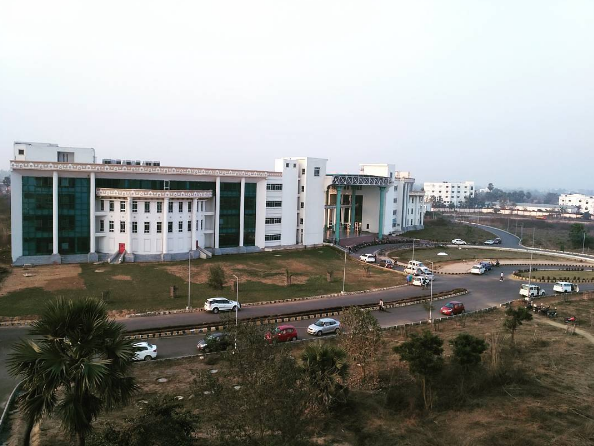
IIT Patna Bihta Campus

Even in nearby villages like Amhara, Kanchanpur, and Dilawarpur the price of 1 cottah of land is ₹ 15-20 Lakh.

Real estate also acquired land near the village of Paharpur to build a colony for families of retired paramilitary forces. Majorly Suraksha enclave members are acquiring land for the development of a residential, logistic and industrial park (LIP), which is fully functional at Bihta at the site of a former sugar mill. Work is in progress by a team led by officials of the IT department. Construction work will begin by mid-2013. It is also popular for Swami Sahajanand Saraswati ashram. Highway Residency By Satyamev Group A RERA Approved Township project is one of them.

== IT Park ==
The Bihar government has acquired 25 acres of land for an IT park. In October 2018, Bihar's government approved Rs 38 crore for the acquisition of 33 acres of land for IT Park at Bihta as part of a Mega Industrial Park. IT giants, including Infosys, have shown interest for a plot near Bihta.

On 25th April 2025, the state's Information Technology Minister, Krishna Kumar Mantoo laid the foundation stone for two major companies—Lexa Lighting Technology Private Limited and Benchmark Infotech park in Sikandarpur village, Bihta.

In April 2026,United News of India reported that Sanjeevani media and technologies Pvt Limited planned to invest ₹50.75 crore rupees in an integrated data and media hub in the Sikandarpur Industrial Area. The proposed facility will include a data centre, call centres, film-editing studio and digital-processing unit, with creating 450 direct jobs.

== Economy ==
A $35 million production facility for Cobra Beer was set up at Bihta in 2010. Not the closed sugar mill is going to be revived.

== In Popular Cultures ==
=== Films set or Shot in Bihata ===
- Laagi Nahi Chhute Ram (1963, Bhojpuri) - This film is set in Bihta and is shot at location such as Bihta railway station and Maner.

== List of villages ==
The list of villages in Bihta Block (under Danapur Tehsil) is as follows: (GP is Gram Panchayat).

Village name	Land area (hectares)	Population (in 2011)
Adlipur	380	1,490
Akhtiarpur	189	1,511
Amhara (GP)	650	
Aminabad	490	5,458
Anandpur (GP)	996	8,504
Babhan Lai	472	3,627
Baghpur	81	2,047
Bahpura	199	4,039
Basaurha	92	1,429
Bazidpur	153	978
Bedauli	118	1,876
Bela (GP)	178	2,631
Bilap	259	2,177
Bindaul (GP)	606	3,668
Bishunpura (GP)	238	4,942
Chauki	10	104
Chaura Gopalpur	51	588
Dalelganj	17	732
Daulatpur Semri (GP)	201	5,750
Dayalpur Daulatpur (GP)	438	5,949
Dekuli	294	3,538
Dihri	202	1,567
Dilawarpur	302	2,179
Doghra	74	1,829
Doghra	367	3,199
Dumri	294	3,440
Etwa	172	1,381
Ghoratap	159	1,920
Gorhna	299	2,414
Hasan Chak	158	
Hiramanpur	83	810
Hiramanpur	47	714
Ibrahimpur	60	524
Jaintipur	190	752
Jamnapur	125	1,657
Kaliganj	19	483
Kamalpur	43	468
Kanhauli	160	4,050
Katesar (GP)	332	7,088
Kauria (GP)	233	3,356
Kelhanpur	160	2,260
Kanchanpur Kharagpur	388	5,035
Kujawan	239	3,249
Kutlupur	334	2,913
Lachhmanpur	138	2,195
Machhalpur Lai (GP)	52	4,167
Maddhupur	41	625
Madhopur	78	1,140
Mahuar	420	1,587
Makhdumpur (GP)	302	3,356
Mathura Pur	40	372
Mithapur	167	596
Modahi	161	4,264
Mohiuddin Chak	39	667
Moharampur		
Monije Chak	39	324
Munsepur (GP)	112	2,191
Mustafapur	104	904
Mustafapur	58	880
Nagabihta	116	658
Narainpur	115	1,512
Nathupur	166	1,247
Neura (GP)	241	6,419
Neuri	154	2,094
Painal (GP)	841	9,618
Pakri	68	1,490
Pali	246	3,507
Pande Chak	05	695
Panrepur	245	2,103
Purusottampur Painathi (GP)	289	3,584
Parri	238	3,517
Purainia	180	1,919
Raghopur Jalahwa (GP)	49	1,731
Rambad	42	164
Ramnagar	47	1,410
Rampur Hasan Lai	83	1,702
Rampur Ismail	269	2,529
Ramtari	212	2,057
Sadisopur (GP)	92	3,900
Samsara	93	1,919
Sikandarpur	483	4,494
Sikandarpur	64	840
Sikaria	103	1,798
Sri Chandpur (GP)	90	2,237
Tara Nagar (GP)	11	1,311
Taregna	60	1,017
Tarvan	90	718
Tikaitpur	206	3,146
Til Bikrampur	39	513

== See also ==
- 1997 Raghopur Massacre
- Bihta railway station
- Bihta Air Force Station
- Patna Regional Development Authority
- Sonepur
