= Bihta Airport =

- IATA: none; ICAO: none

Summary
- Airport type: Public
- Operator: Airports Authority of India
- Serves: Bihta of Bihar, India
- Elevation AMSL: 46 m (151 ft)
- Coordinates: 25°35′29.84″N 084°52′55.52″E

Map
- Location within Bihar Location within India

Runways
| Direction | Length | | Surface |
| Direction | m | ft | Surface |
|---|---|---|---|
| 11L/29R | 1,300 | 4,265 | Unpaved |

Bihta Airport (also referred to as the Bihta Civil Enclave) is a proposed civilian aviation facility at Bihta Air Force Station in Bihta, Bihar, India. The project is intended to expand civilian aviation capacity serving Patna and the surrounding region through the development of a civil enclave at the existing Indian Air Force airbase.

== Background ==
Patna's existing airport faces constraints on further expansion. The Airports Authority of India (AAI) proposed developing civilian aviation facilities at Bihta Air Force Station as an additional source of airport capacity for the region.

In 2015, the Ministry of Civil Aviation announced a proposal to develop the Bihta airfield for civilian aviation, including consideration of international operations.

== Development ==
=== Approval and construction ===
On 16 August 2024, the Union Cabinet approved the development of a civil enclave at Bihta at an estimated cost of ₹1,413 crore. The approved project includes an integrated passenger terminal and associated airport infrastructure.

The proposed terminal has an area of approximately 66,000 square metres and is designed to handle up to five million passengers annually in its initial configuration. The design provides for potential expansion to accommodate up to ten million passengers annually.

The project includes aircraft parking stands, taxiways, terminal facilities and associated infrastructure. The civilian facilities are being developed in connection with the existing military airfield rather than as a wholly separate airport site.

=== Construction progress ===
The project entered its construction phase following the approval and subsequent procurement of construction works by AAI.

In July 2026, AAI had issued a show-cause notice to the contractor responsible for the passenger terminal and had initiated steps towards possible contract termination because of delays.

In October 2026, the construction of the terminal remained substantially behind schedule.

The completion date and operational commencement of the civilian airport depend on construction progress, completion of the required facilities and the relevant regulatory and operational approvals.

== Runway expansion ==
In addition to the civil enclave, proposals have been made to extend the existing runway to support a broader range of aircraft operations. The expansion requires additional land and associated administrative approvals.

In January 2026, the Bihar Civil Aviation Department had sought clarification concerning land acquisition for the proposed runway extension, including the identification of affected settlements.

The runway-extension proposal is distinct from the development of the civil enclave and its passenger terminal.

== See also ==
- Jay Prakash Narayan Airport
- Airports Authority of India
- Indian Air Force
