= Patna Municipal Corporation =

Civic body governing Patna, Bihar, India

Patna Municipal Corporation Patna Nagar Nigam
- Emblem of Patna Municipal Corporation

Type
- Type: Municipal corporation

History
- Founded: 2 November 1864; 162 years ago as Patna Municipality
- Succeeded by: Patna Municipal Corporation 16 August 1952; 74 years ago

Leadership
- Mayor: Sita Sahu
- Deputy Mayor: Reshmi Kumari
- Municipal Commissioner: yashpal meena , IAS
- Seats: 75

Elections
- Last election: 2022
- Next election: 2027

Meeting place
- Second Floor, Block-C, Maurya Lok Complex, Budhha Marg, Patna, Bihar - 800001

Website
- pmc.bihar.gov.in

The Patna Municipal Corporation abbr.PMC, also known as Patna Nagar Nigam, is the urban local governing body responsible for the administration of Patna, the capital city of Bihar, India. It is one of the oldest municipal corporations in eastern India and is responsible for civic infrastructure, sanitation, urban planning, public health, drainage, solid waste management and municipal services of the city.

The corporation functions under the provisions of the Patna Municipal Corporation Act, 1951, and is headed by a Mayor, while executive functions are carried out by the Municipal Commissioner appointed by the Government of Bihar.

== History ==
The Patna Municipality, was established on 2 November 1864. Sir Khan Bahadur Khuda Bakhsh was elected as the first honorary vice chairman of the municipality under the Former Governor General of India George Robinson's cabinet in 1880. It was renamed to Patna City Municipality in 1917. Municipal Corporation mechanism in India was introduced during British Rule with formation of municipal corporation in Madras (Chennai) in 1688, later followed by municipal corporations in Bombay (Mumbai) and Calcutta (Kolkata) by 1762. Patna City Municipality along with Patna Administrative Committee and Patna Bankipur Joint Water Works Committee were substituted by the Patna Municipal Corporation (PMC), which came into force on 15 August 1952 under the provision of the Patna Municipal Act, 1951. The first election of the PMC councilors were held in March 1954, but they came in office on 1 February 1955.

== Overview ==
Patna Municipal Corporation administers an area of 108.87 km^{2}. There are 75 wards placed under executive control of six administrative circles and has a population of 1.7 million as per 2011 census.

Each ward elects a councilor to the PMC. The Mayor is usually chosen through indirect election by the councilors from among themselves for a term of two and a half years.

Each administrative circle is administered by an Executive officer who is deputed by the Government of Bihar. The Municipal commissioner is the Chief executive officer and head of the executive arm of the corporation. Although the Municipal corporation is the legislative body that lays down policies for the governance of the city, it is the commissioner who is responsible for the execution of the policies.

By means of the standing committees, the corporation undertakes urban planning and maintains roads, government-aided schools, hospitals, and municipal markets. As Patna's apex body, the corporation discharges its functions through the mayor-in-council, which comprises a mayor, a deputy mayor, and other elected members of the PMC. The functions of the PMC include water supply, drainage and sewerage, sanitation, solid waste management, street lighting, and building regulation. It also deals with the issue of birth registration and death registration. Municipal Commissioner is the executive head of the corporation, who is assisted by a large number of officers, belonging to different departments in the corporation. Administrative circles and Wards:

Administrative circle	Total no. of wards	Wards	Circle office
Azimabad	12	52, 53, 54, 56, 57, 58, 59, 60, 61, 63, 64, 65	Sabzi Mandi, Gulzarbagh
Bankipur	12	36, 38, 39, 40, 41, 42, 43, 47, 48, 49, 50, 51	Ambedkar Bhawan, Rajendra Nagar
Kankarbagh	11	29, 30, 31, 32, 33, 34, 35, 44, 45, 46, 55	Tempo Stand, Kankarbagh
New Capital	16	3, 4, 9, 10, 11, 12, 13, 14, 15, 16, 17, 18, 19, 21, 28, 37	10 Harding Road
Patliputra	16	1, 2, 5, 6, 7, 8, 20, 22, 22A, 22B, 22C, 23, 24, 25, 26, 27	Boring Road
Patna City	8	62, 66, 67, 68, 69, 70, 71, 72	Sabzi Mandi, Gulzarbagh

The corporation also has eight engineering divisions viz. Azimabad Division, Bankipur Division, Ganga Division, Kankarbagh Division, New Capital Division, Patliputra Division, Patna City Division and Water Board Division for the execution of various infrastructure works each of which has an executive engineer.

=== Wards ===
Zone	Sr. No.	Assembly Constituency	Ward No.	Ward Councillor	Political Group
	1		1	Chhatiya Devi	
	2		2	Babita Kumari	
	3		3	Prabha Devi	
	4		4	Usha Devi	
	5		5	Dipa Rani Khan	
	6		6	Dhanraj Devi	
	7		7	Amar Kumar	
	8		8	Rita Rani	
	9		9	Ashish Kumar Shankar	
	10		10	Geeta Devi	
	11		11	Ravi Prakash	
	12		12	Savita Sinha	
	13		13	Geet Kumar	
	14		14	Shweta Rai	
	15		15	Shashi Bhushan	
	16		16	Jay Prakash Singh	
	17		17	Soni Devi	
	18		18	Ranjan Kumar	
	19		19	Sharda Devi	
	20		20	Bharti Kumari	
	21		21	Shweta Ranjan	
	22		22	Anita Devi	
	23		22A	Sushila Kumari	
	24		22B	Suchitra Singh	
	25		22C	Anita Devi	
	26		23	Kumari Sarika	
	27		24	Gyanwati Devi	
	28		25	Rajanikant	
	29		26	Kanti Devi	
	30		27	Rani Kumari	
	31		28	Vinay Kumar	
	32		29	Vikash Kumar	
	33		30	Kaviri Singh	
	34		31	Radha Sharma	
	35		32	Pinki Yadav	
	36		33	Sheela Devi	
	37		34	Kumar Ranjeet	
	38		35	Raj Kumar Gupta	
	39		36	Raj Kapoor Sharma	
	40		37	Sanjeev Anand	
	41		38	Ashish Kumar Sinha	
	42		39	Rahul Yadav	
	43		40	Asfar Ahmad	
	44		41	Kiran Devi	
	45		42	Kailash Prasad Yadav	
	46		43	Rajani Sinha	
	47		44	Ashish Chandra Yadav	
	48		45	Prabha Devi	
	49		46	Poonam Sharma	
	50		47	Satish Kumar	
	51		48	Indradip Kumar Chandravanshi	
	52		49	Seema Varma	
	53		50	Aarju	
	54		51	Jyoti Ranjan Das	
	55		52	Mahjarbi	
	56		53	Kiran Mehata	
	57		54	Vinay Kumar	
	58		55	Kanchan Kumar	
	59		56	Kismati Devi	
	60		57	Gyatri Gupta	
	61		58	Sweta Kumari	
	62		59	Neelam Kumri	
	63		60	Shobha Devi	
	64		61	Usha Devi	
	65		62	Tara Devi	
	66		63	Faizur Rahman Khan	
	67		64	Abda Kuraishi	
	68		65	Taruna Rai	
	69		66	Kanti Devi	
	70		67	Manoj Kumr	
	71		68	Sunita Devi	
	72		69	Manoj Mehta	
	73		70	Vinod Kumar	
	74		71	Anjali Rai	
	75		72	Sandhya Yadav	

== Headquarters ==
The headquarters of the Patna Municipal Corporation is located at Maurya Lok Complex, Buddha Marg, Patna.

The corporation also maintains circle offices and ward-level administrative facilities across the city.

== Departments ==
The Patna Municipal Corporation headquarter has following departments for the functioning of various works assigned under the Bihar Municipal Act, 2007:

- Establishment Section
- Finance and Accounts Section
- Revenue Section
- Estate Section
- Planning Section
- Engineering Section
- Urban Planning Section
- Sanitation Section
- Vigilance Section
- Legal Section
- Legislative Section
- RTI Section
- E-Governance Section

== Services, Campaigns and Initiatives ==
Patna Municipal Corporation started the process of bringing new life in its defunct status in the year 2018, the 155th year of its formation under the leadership of Municipal Commissioner Anupam Kumar Suman. The City of Patna received a fresh lease of life through a total and comprehensive renewal approach. New commissioner claimed that he had changed the functioning of PMC through various urban policy interventions including use of innovative technological measures. The year 2018-2019 brought various initiatives and development in the City of Patna.

=== Door-to-Door Garbage Collection Service ===
Door-to-Door Garbage Collection Service initiated in the City of Patna from 2 October 2018. It was the first occasion in the history of the city that all 75 wards were covered under the systematic door-to-door garbage collection. A fleet of 557 vehicles performs this service every day, round the year.

After the inclusion of more than 800 small and big vehicles in the Waste Management Army, PMC imported the biggest warrior in its camp to fight road dirt and dust pollution. The 10 self-propelled vacuum road-sweeping machines, from Italy and Turkey to clean the City of Patna roads.

=== One Dream, Patna Clean Initiative ===
A participatory campaign called 'One Dream, Patna Clean' was initiated under which every Sunday the team of corporations along with the general public and most students started to clean one specific area. This campaign not only brought a kind of awareness in the city but it was more effective in creating sensitization among the sanitary workers and street bureaucrats about what they were up to.

=== Batti Jalao Campaign ===
Under this campaign, 72,257 LED streetlights were installed to brighten up the streets of the City of Patna. First time in the history of the city, such a large number of streetlights were installed, without leaving any dark space.

=== AutoMAP: Building Plan Approval System ===
Patna Municipal Corporation becomes the first urban local body of Bihar to launch the online approval system for building plans. AutoMAP can be used to apply for a new building plan, revision of approved building plan, addition/alterations of existing buildings with prior approvals and occupancy permits from Patna Municipal Corporation and relating to categories of buildings mentioned in Bihar Building Bylaws 2014.

=== Gharaunde Se Ghar Tak ===
Due to rapid rural-to-urban migration, economic stagnation, and poverty, slums are formed in every city. Lack of proper economic accommodation and basic facilities the slum dwellers are facing ghastly hygiene issues. Therefore, Patna Municipal Corporation initiated a Campaign named "Gharaunde Se Ghar Tak" to upgrade the lifestyle of slum dwellers which intends to function on basic amenities in every area. Such as

- Community Toilets
- Supply of Potable water
- Proper maintenance of street lights
- Cleaning of streets and sewers
- Plantation on roadsides
- Door to Door Garbage collection
- Availability of mobile medicals vans for primary health services
- Self Help Group formation, Career Counseling, and Skill Development

PMC has also joined hands with UNFPA, a United Nations wing, for the training of municipal workers who mostly resides in these slums.

=== Patna Smart City Limited ===
Patna Smart City Limited is an SPV formed on 9 November 2017 under the Smart City Mission of Government of India. The Divisional Commissioner of Patna is its chairman and the Patna Municipal Commissioner is its managing director. Patna Smart City Projects took off under the leadership of then Municipal Commissioner-cum-Managing Director Anupam kumar Suman who awarded all the projects within the time frame allowed by the Government of India and thus he launched various projects and pushed them up just within 1 year of its formation.

As of September 2021, Only six out of 83 Patna smart city projects completed in 4 years. The six completed projects include a mega screen (75x42ft) installed at Gandhi Maidan at the cost of around Rs 7 crore, rejuvenation of Adalatganj pond, re-modeling of 1.25 km long Beerchand Patel Path, wall art or painting for social awareness, integrated solid waste management system and integrated control and command centre.

==== Mithila meets Magadh ====
One of the World's Largest Painting Campaigns, "Mithila meets Magadh" was a joint initiative of Patna Municipal Corporation and Patna Smart City Limited under the leadership of Municipal Commissioner Anupam Kumar Suman involving hundreds of Mithila Painters aiming to remove all the garbage vulnerable points of the city. The Campaign successfully completed its first phase of Wall Painting on the streets of Patna with a total of 6.18 lakhs sq.ft area decorated with beautiful murals.

==== Kusumpur Returns ====
Kusumpur (city of flowers) is the earliest known name of the city of Patna before it first became Pushpapur and then Patliputra (following the name of Patli tree). Even in the modern period, there were some big size gardens(baghs) like garden bagh and Kankarbagh. In a bid to regain City of Patna its status of "CityOfFlower", and to bring back the flowery tradition of this great city an ambitious project by the name of "Kusumpur Returns" was started. Under "Kusumpur Returns" 5300 plants were distributed by Patna Smart City among the voters during General Elections 2019 at Vasundhara Matdan Kendra to make citizens aware of the importance of plants. Other 3000 plants were planted on Ganga River Front on the occasion of World Environment Day 2019. Up to 1 lac plants and saplings are to be planted during the monsoon season of 2019

== Revenue ==
The corporation generates revenue through:

- Property tax
- User charges and municipal fees
- Trade licences
- Advertisement tax and permissions
- Grants from the Government of Bihar and Government of India
- Municipal service charges

Property tax constitutes one of the principal sources of municipal revenue.
