= List of museums in Bihar =

This list of museums in Bihar is a list of museums, defined for this context as institutions (including nonprofit organizations, government entities, and private businesses) that collect and care for objects of cultural, artistic, scientific, or historical interest and make their collections or related exhibits available for public viewing. Museums that exist only in cyberspace (i.e., virtual museums) are not included.

== State Government Museums ==
This is a list of museums owned by State Government:

Name	City	Established	Type	Owner	Summary
Patna Museum	Patna	1917	Archaeological	Deptt. of Art, Culture & Youth	oldest
Chandradhari Museum	Darbhanga	1957	Art	-	private collection of Sri Chandradhari Singh, a Zamindar of Madhubani
Gaya Museum	Gaya	1970	Art	Directorate of Archaeology & Museums	
Naradah Museum	Nawada	1974	Art	Deptt. of Art, Culture & Youth	
Maharaja Lakshmishwar Singh Museum	Darbhanga	1979			
Bhagalpur Museum	Bhagalpur	1979			
Chandra Shekhar Singh Museum	Jamui	1983			
Biharsharif Museum	Biharsharif	1979			
Sita Ram Upadhyay Museum	Buxar	1979			
Ram Chandra Shahi Museum	Muzaffarpur	1979			
Begusarai Museum	Begusarai	1981			
Munger Museum	Munger	1980			
lakhisarai Museum	Lakhisarai	2023			
Chapra Museum	Chhapra				
Jana-Nayak Karpoori Tahkur Smriti Sangrahalay	Patna	1990			
Babu Kunwar Singh Smriti Sangrahalay	Bhojpur	1972			
Deep Narayan Singh Museum	Hajipur	1979		Directorate of Archaeology and museum	
Mithila Lalit Sangrahalaya	Saurath (Madhubani)	1975		Department of Art, Culture and Youth Development, Government of Bihar	
Gandhi Smriti Sangrahalaya	Bhitiharwa (West Champaran)				
Suraj Narayan Singh Museum	Patna				
Baba Karu Khirhar Pramandaliya Museum	Saharsa				
Small Scale Industrial Museum	Patna				
Bihar Police Museum	Patna				
Bihar Museum	Patna	2015			

== Central Government Museums ==
This is a list of museums owned by Central Government:

Name	City	Established	Type	Owner	Summary
Archaeological Museum, Nalanda	Nalanda	1917			
Archaeological Museum, Bodh Gaya	Bodh Gaya	1956			
Archaeological Museum, Vaishali		1971			
Archaeological Museum, Vikramshila	Kahalgaon (Bhagalpur district)	2004			
Jamalpur Railway Heritage Museum, Jamalpur	Jamalpur, Munger	2018		Eastern Railway	
Srikrishna Science Centre	Patna	1978			

== University Museums ==
This is a list of museums owned by Universities/Semi-Govt. Organisations:

Name	Institution	City	Established	Type	Summary
KP Jaiswal archaeology museum	GD College	Begusarai	1947, shifted in new building 27 March 2000		
P.G. Departmental Museum	Patna University	Patna	1960-61		
P.G. Department Museum	Magadh University	Bodh Gaya	1971		
State Art Gallery	College of Arts & Crafts	Patna	1951		
Folk Art Museum	Bhartiya Nritya Kala Mandir	Patna	1963		

== Non-Govt. Organizations Museums ==
This is a list of museums owned by Non-Govt. Organizations (Trust, Society, etc.):

Name	City	Established	Type	Owner	Summary
Gandhi Sangrahalaya	Patna	1967			
Rajendra Smriti Sangrahalaya	Patna	1963			
Art-Gallery of Jaina Siddhanta Bhawan	Arrah				

== Private Museums ==
This is a list of museums run by private individuals:

Name	City	Established	Type	Owner	Summary
Jalan Museum, Qila House	Patna City	1954			
Kumar Sangrahalay	Samastipur	1956			

== See also ==
- List of museums in India
- International Museum Day
