= Gandhi Sangrahalaya, Patna =

Museum and memorial for Mahatma Gandhi

- Location within Patna
- Established: 1967
- Location: North - West Gandhi Maidan, Ashok Rajpath, Patna, Bihar, India
- Coordinates: 25.6205°N 85.1422°E
- Website: gandhisangrahalayapatna.org

The Gandhi Smarak Sangrahalaya (Gandhi Memorial Institution) is a museum and public service institution, showcasing the life and principles of Mahatma Gandhi, and his role in Bihar during the independence struggle of India. It is one of the eleven Gandhi Sanghralayas (Gandhi Museums) in the country.

== History ==
Years after the assassination of Mahatma Gandhi in 1948, an appeal was made to the citizens of India nationwide to build memorials for Gandhi. With the help of contribution of poor and rich citizens of India, a trust was established with the name Mahatma Gandhi National Memorial Trust, for this cause. The Patna Sangrahalaya was established in 1967 near the North-Western corner of Gandhi Maidan. It was a member of the Central Gandhi Sangrahalaya Samiti until July 1971, when the five museums (Ahmadabad, Madurai, Bairakpore, Mumbai, Patna) were made independent. Since then, Gandhi Sangrahalaya, Patna has been an autonomous institution.

The museum is located in a quiet place, and contains a Visual Biography of Bapuji containing photos, paintings, sculptures, manuscripts, and quotations; all the major events in his life are told here. There is also a section containing photographs of his childhood through the various phases of Gandhi's life, including being taken to the crematorium. A replica of his room is in the hall of the museum. The building also houses a library which has a rich collection of books, magazine, literature & audio-video material related to the life of Mahatma Gandhi, and a book store.

== See also ==
- Statue of Mahatma Gandhi, Gandhi Maidan
- Bihar Museum
- International Museum Day
- List of museums in Bihar
