= Jalan Museum =

Jalan Museum, Patna
- Quila House
- Established: 1919
- Location: Patna, Bihar, India
- Coordinates: 25.598591°N 85.229547°E
- Type: Art & Heritage Museum
- Collections: 10,000 objects
- Owners: BM Jalan, GM Jalan and Advay Jalan
- Website: quilahouse.com

The Jalan Museum (Hindi: जलान संग्रहालय), Quila house, is a private museum located in Patna, Bihar, India. It is one of the only two private museums in Bihar state.

== Overview ==
Quila House is a private residential house on the banks of the Ganga river in the old town of Patna, in the state of Bihar, in northern India. Built in 1919, the house is known for the collection of objets d'art and antiques that is a personal achievement of Diwan Bahadur Radha Krishna Jalan (R.K. Jalan) (1882–1954), who was a businessman and an art collector. The building it is in the style of English and Dutch and is known locally as the Quila House.

The collection of objects numbering to about 10,000, belonged mostly to the modern period include stone, metal, terra cotta, ivory, glass and porcelains. Of the art objects, many are European and a few from the far and near eastern countries of Asia.

Part of the building continues to be a private residential area of the Jalan family. The museum is open to visitors 9-11 am, Mondays to Saturdays, and 10 am – 4 pm on Sundays, though prior appointment, 48 hours before the visit is required.

== See also ==
- Patna Museum
- Bihar Museum
