= Lohanipur torso =

Ancient sandstone statue

Lohanipur torso(Jain Tirthankara)
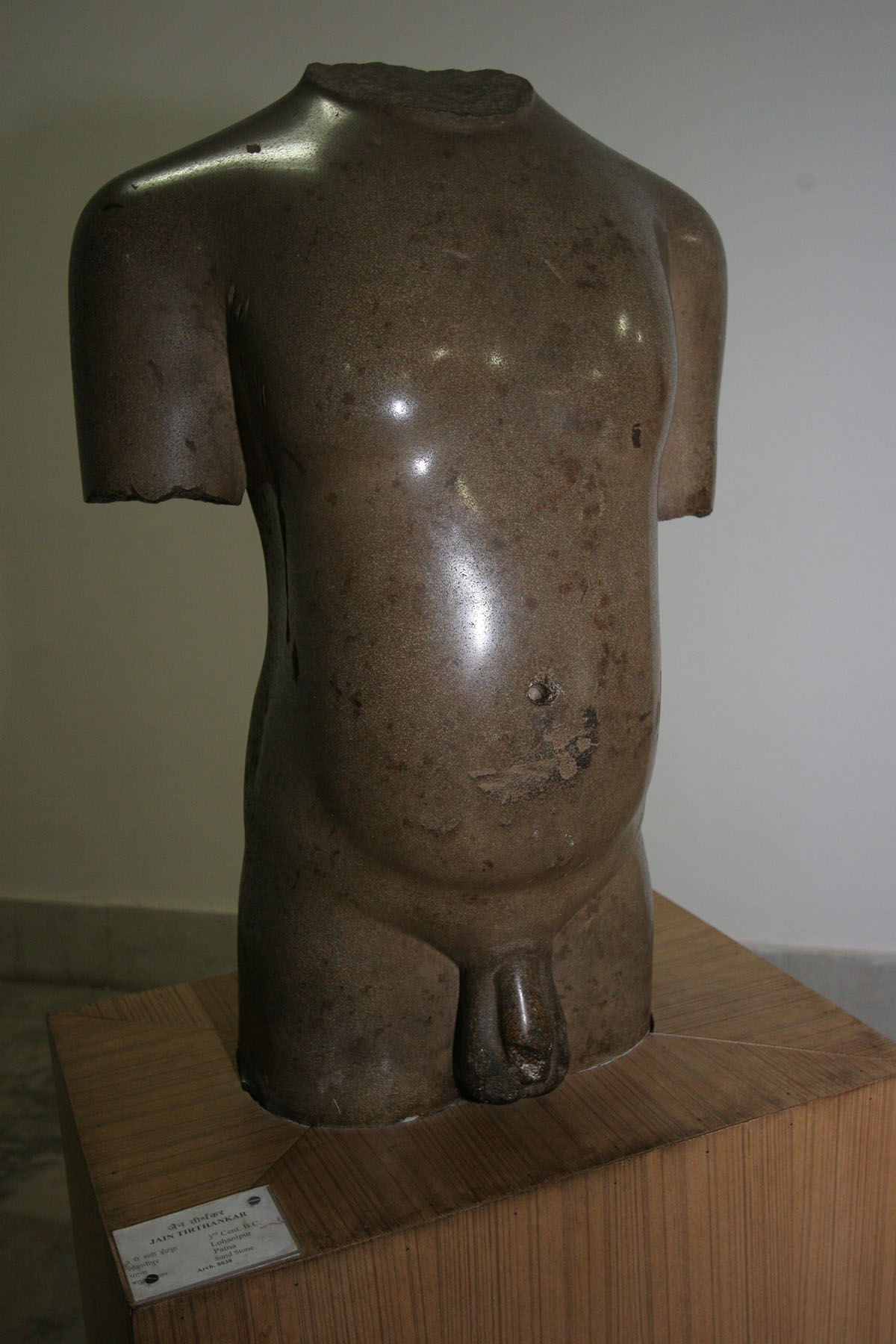
- Lohanipur torso, Patna Museum.
- Material: Polished sandstone
- Period/culture: 3rd century BCE ~ 2nd century CE
- Discovered: 25.606366°N 85.154401°E
- Place: Lohanipur, Patna, Bihar, India.
- Present location: Patna Museum, India

Location
- Lohanipur area in Patna

The Lohanipur torso is a damaged statue of polished sandstone, dated to the 3rd century BCE ~ 2nd century CE, found in Lohanipur village, a central Division of Patna, ancient Pataliputra, Bihar, India. There are some claims however for a later date (not earlier than the Kushana period), as well as of Graeco-Roman influence in the sculpting.The Lohanipur torso is thought to represent a Jaina Tirthankara.

K. P. Jayaswal and M. A. Dhaky have regarded this to be the earliest Jain sculpture found. The Didarganj Yakshi is another polished statue from Patna whose date is disputed, with the possible range between the Mauryan and Kushan periods.

== Finding ==
The 2-foot torso is one of the two found in 1937 in an area of Patna. The smaller torso is one foot tall. Historian K.P. Jayaswal reported that the excavation of the site revealed a Mauryan coin and a number of Mauryan bricks from a square shaped temple, suggesting the torso is from the Mauryan period.

== Description ==
The Lohanipur torso is thought to represent a Jaina Tirthankara. The statue is an outstanding example of Mauryan polish, an advanced polishing technique essentially characteristic of the Mauryan Empire, which almost fell out of use after that period, although, if it is of a later date, it might suggest that polishing techniques survived the Mauryan era.

== Comparison with the Harappa torso ==
The Lohanipur torso bears a striking resemblance with the Harappan jasper torso excavated in the 1928/29 season by Madho Sarup Vats, to the south of the "Great Granary" at Harappa. This ought to belong to the Mature Harappan period based on the dating of the site strata, but its date is questioned or disputed by scholars such as the British archaeologists Mortimer Wheeler or John Marshall, who suggested a historical period, probably Gupta (circa 500 CE). In 2002, the anthropologist Gregory Possehl commented that "it seems reasonable" that the piece belongs to the Mature Harappan period, exhibiting "the heights to which Indus artists could reach". In that case, the Harappa torso would date to 2300–1750 BCE.

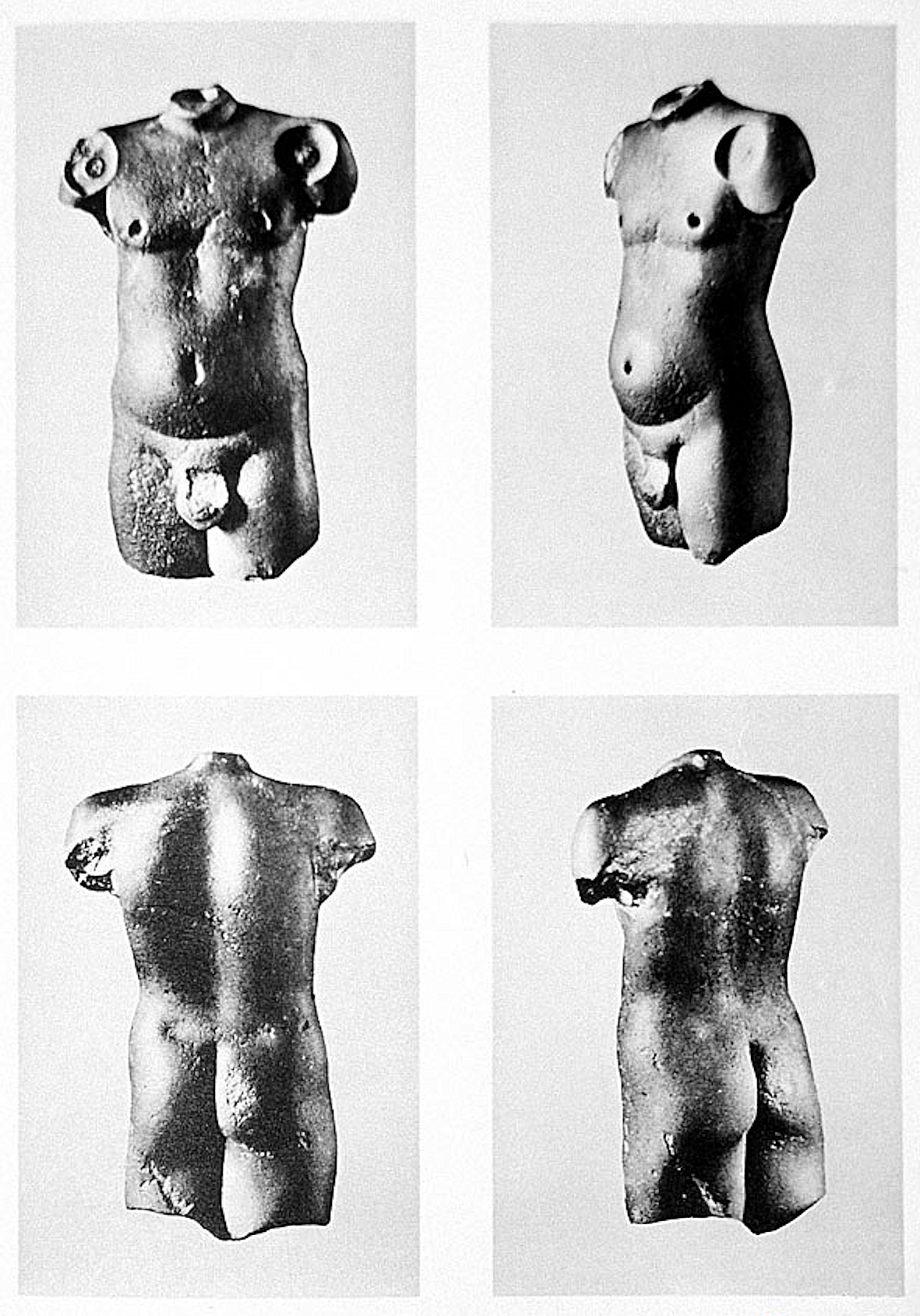
Harappa male torso from various angles.

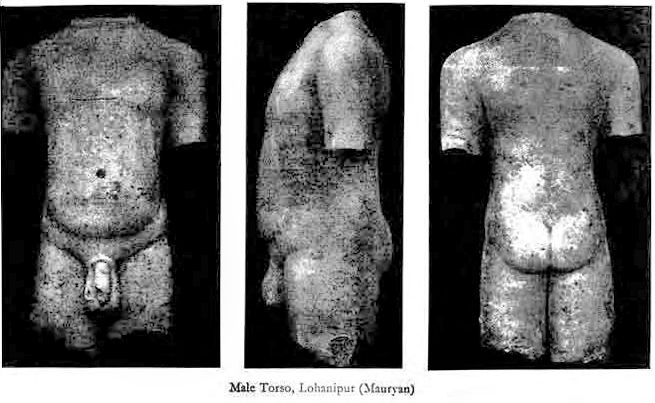
The Lohanipur torse from various angles

== See also ==
- Kankali Tila
- Patna Museum
- Chausa hoard
- Didarganj Yakshi
- Ayagapata – namely Kankali Tila tablet of Sodasa, and Parsvanatha ayagapata
