= Patna Museum =

State museum in India

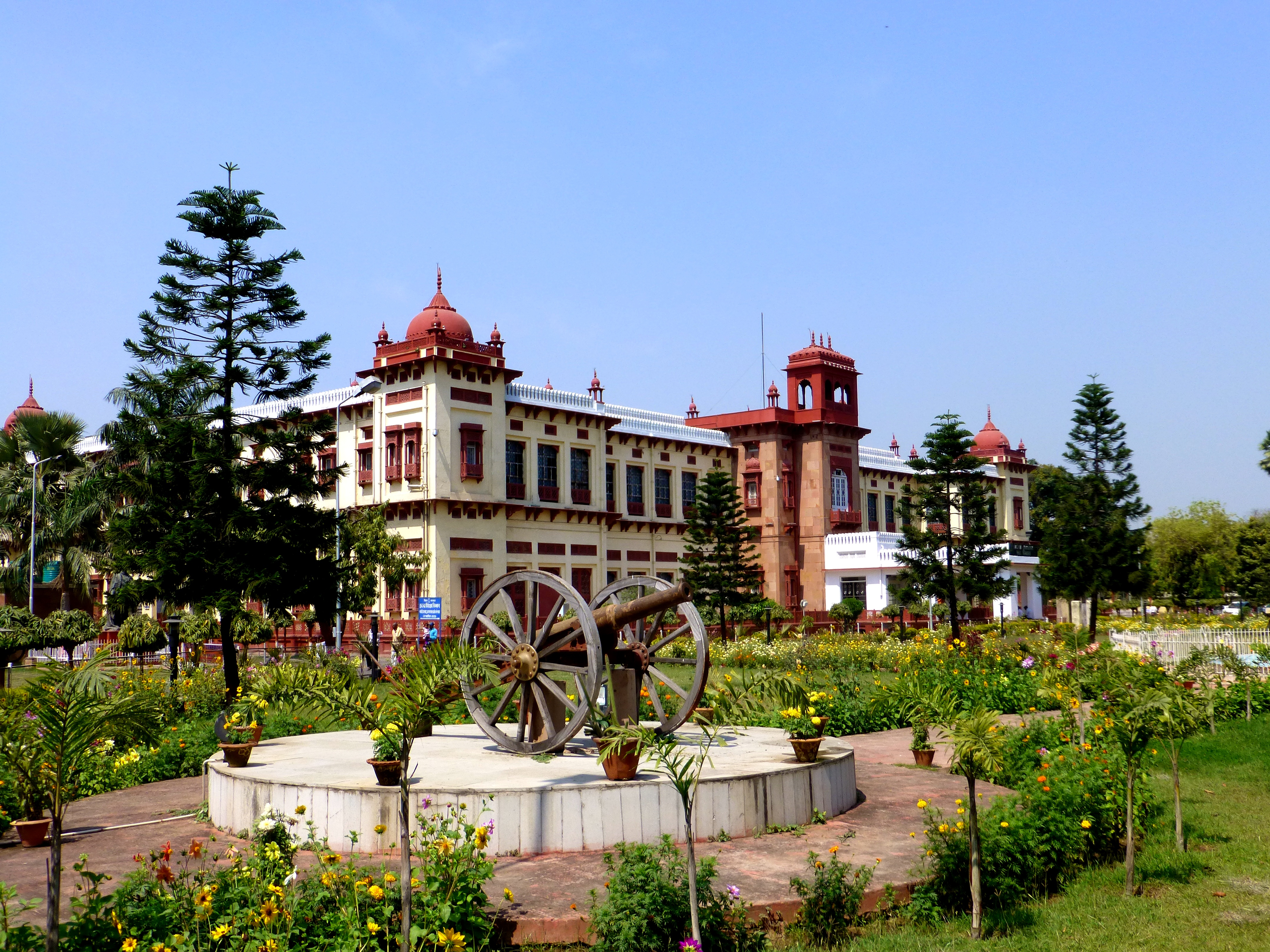

- Patna Museum Patna Museum (Bihar)
- Established: 3 April 1917
- Location: Buddha Marg, Patna, Bihar
- Coordinates: 25°36′45″N 85°07′59″E
- Type: Archaeological & Natural
- Key holdings: Lohanipur torso
- Visitors: 800,119 (2007)
- Director: JPN Singh

Patna Museum is the state museum of the Indian state of Bihar. Founded on 3 April 1917 during the British Raj to house the historical artefacts found in the vicinity of Patna, it is constructed in the style of Mughal and Rajput architecture, and is known locally as the Jadu Ghar. Artefacts from the ancient India era to 1764 have now been transferred to Bihar Museum.

The Kashi Prasad Jayaswal Research Institute (KPJRI) which carries out research in the field of history and archaeology also operates out of Patna Museum and was established by the Bihar Government.

== History ==
The museum was constructed by the British to conserve and display the historical artifacts found in the vicinity of the state capital. The concept of having a museum arose in 1912, after Bihar and Bengal were separated. Patna Museum started functioning in 1915 from the commissioner's bungalow, on the campus of A. N. Sinha Institute.

The artifacts were then shifted to new rooms at the Patna High Court building before being taken to the present building in 1929. The land that was selected for the museum, in 1925, was on Patna-Gaya road (now Budh Marg). The two-storeyed building, designed by Rai Bahadur Bishnu Swarup, was completed in 1928. It was opened as the first museum of Bihar and Orissa Province by then Governor of Bihar and Orissa, Sir Hugh Lansdown Stephenson.

== Collections ==
Items on display in the multipurpose museum include archaeological objects, coins, art objects, paintings, instruments, textiles, paintings, thankas, bronze images and sculptures and terra cotta images by Hindu and Buddhist artists. It has a rare collection of British-period paintings depicting day-to-day life, as well as a fine collection related to the first President of India, Rajendra Prasad. It also houses a World War I cannon.

The fossil of a tree said to be more than 200 million years old is on display, as is a casket — unearthed in 1958 by archaeologist, A. S. Altekar, at the Relic Stupa of Vaishali — said to contain the sacred ashes (relics) of Gautama Buddha. A Didarganj Yakshi statue, discovered on a Ganges riverbank in 1917, was the museum's most prized collection, which was later shifted to Bihar Museum. The artefacts from ancient India era to 1764 are kept in Bihar Museum and those of post-1764 period are kept at Patna Museum. Rahul Sankrityayan donated 10,000 manuscripts that are written in gold and silver on handmade papers and books on Buddhist philosophy that were once in the library of ancient Nalanda and Vikramshila universities. These manuscript were taken to Tibet dating back of around 700 years ago before the destruction of these universities. These manuscripts were brought by him. Beginning November 2009, a project was started to build a replacement museum in Patna to enable the display of larger collections.

== Heritage tunnel to Bihar Museum ==
In January 2023, Government of Bihar appointed Delhi Metro Railway Corporation Ltd as consultant for the construction of a 1.4-km-long proposed subway (heritage tunnel) between Bihar Museum and Patna Museum. In August 2023, cabinet of Bihar Government approved the construction of heritage tunnel at the revised cost of ₹ 542 crore.

== K. P. Jayaswal Research Institute ==
The K. P. Jayaswal Research Institute in Patna was established by the Government of Bihar in 1950 with the object of promoting "historical research, archaeological excavation and investigations and publication of works of permanent value to scholars". The institute is currently based out of Patna Museum.

Notable publications include:

- Bindeshwari Prasad Sinha, Ed.: Comprehensive History of Bihar, Volume 1, Part 1 (1974)
- Bindeshwari Prasad Sinha, Ed.: Comprehensive History of Bihar, Volume 1, Part 2 (1974)
- S. H. Askari and Q. Ahmad, Ed.: Comprehensive History of Bihar, Volume 2, Part 1 (1983)
- S. H. Askari and Q. Ahmad, Ed.: Comprehensive History of Bihar, Volume 2, Part 2 (1987)
- K. K. Datta and J. S. Jha, Ed.: Comprehensive History of Bihar, Volume 3, Part 1 (1976)
- K. K. Datta and J. S. Jha, Ed.: Comprehensive History of Bihar, Volume 3, Part 2 (1976)

== Gallery ==
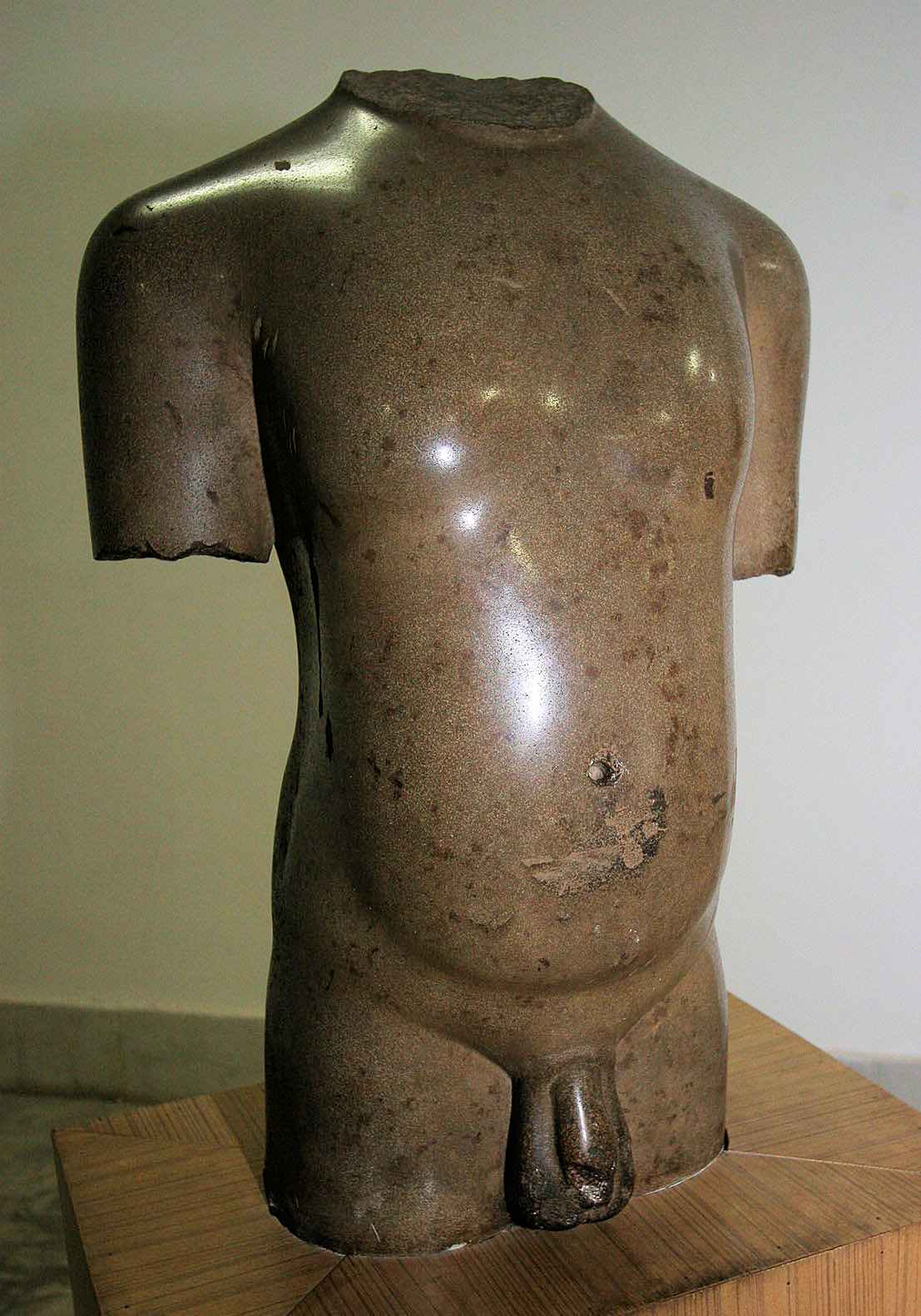
Lohanipur torso, 3rd century BCE

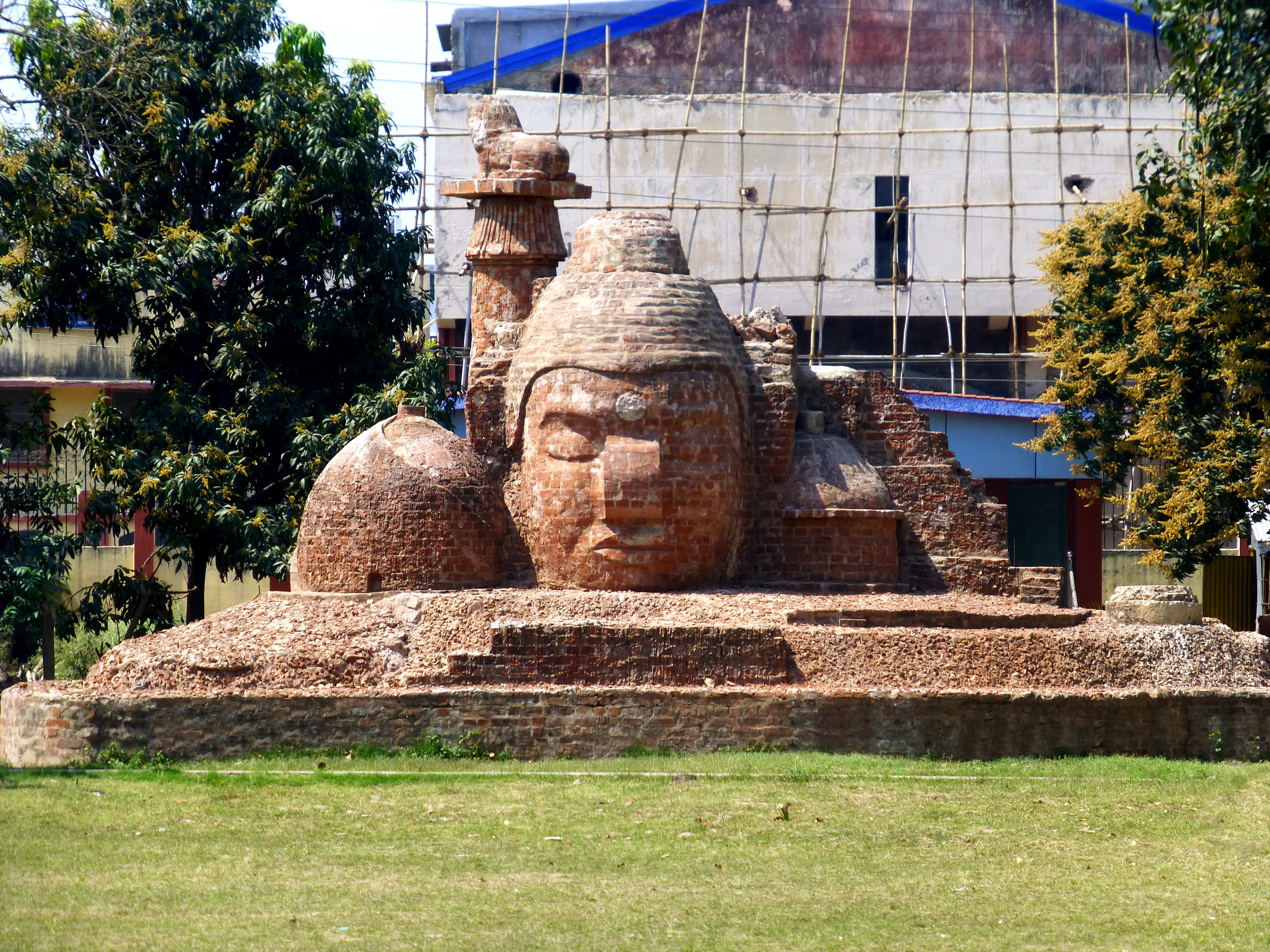
Brick Sculpture of Buddha

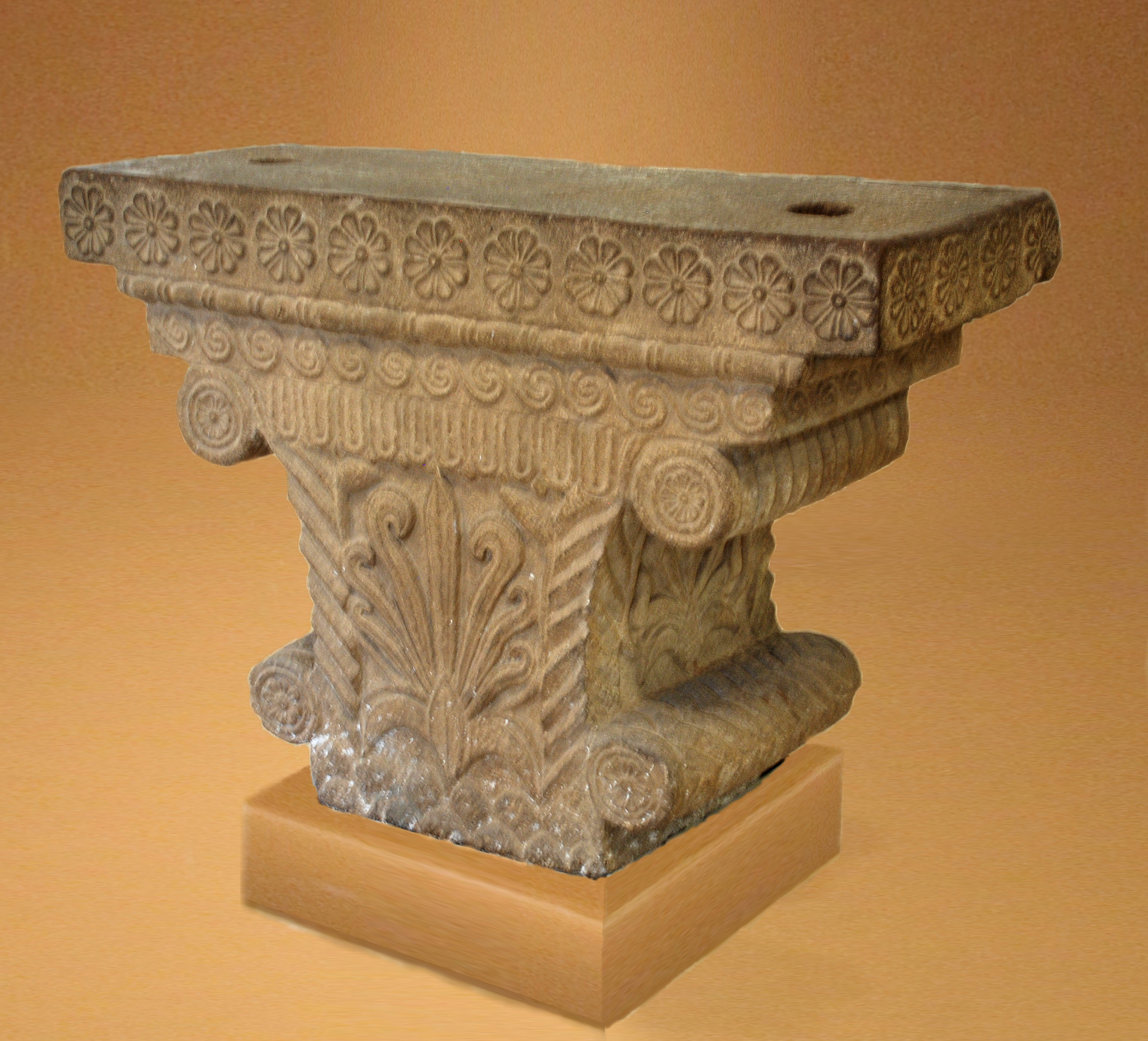
Pataliputra palace capital (front and left-side view), early Maurya Empire period, 3rd century BCE.

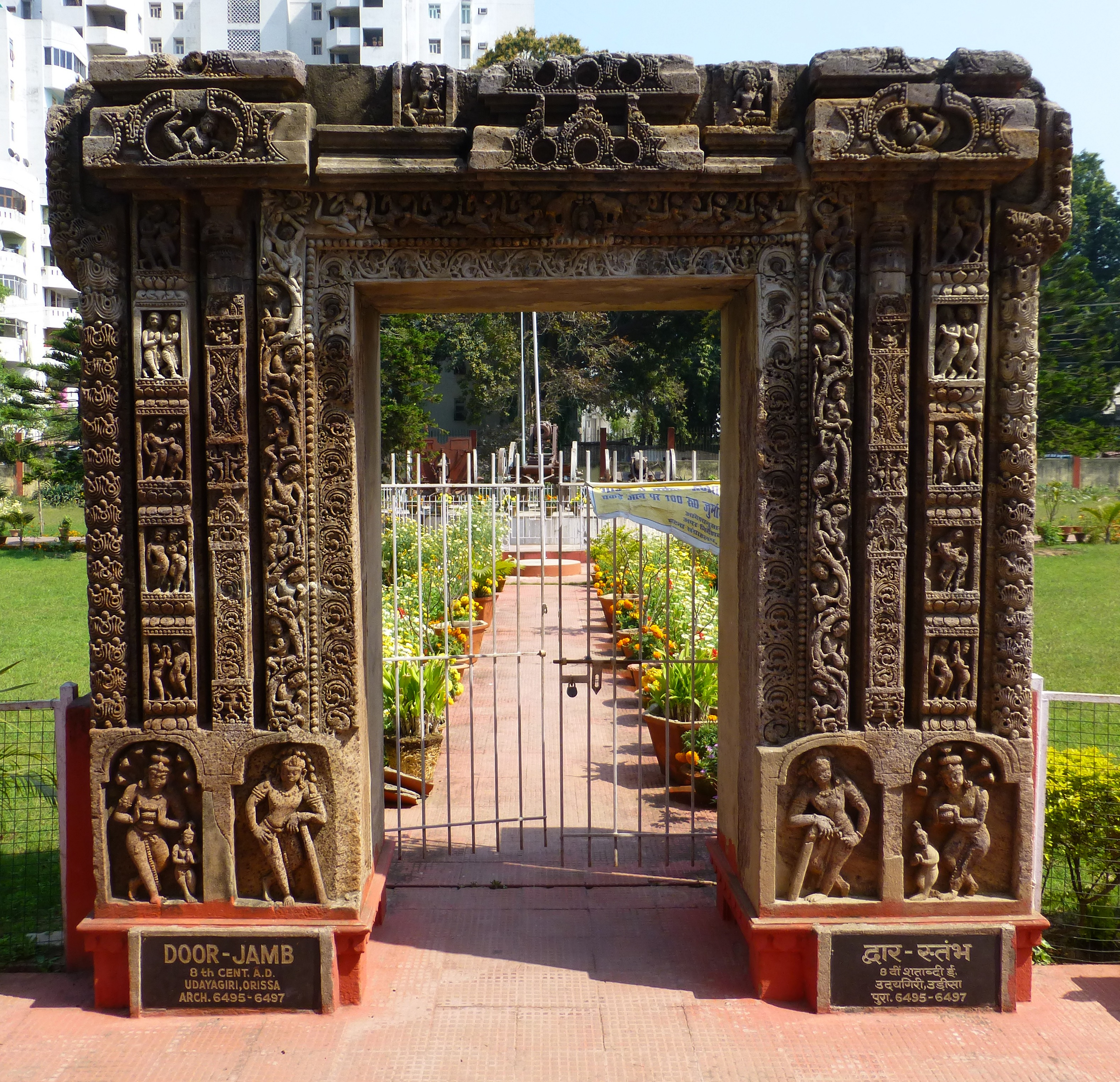
'Dwar Stambh', Udyagiri, 8th Century AD

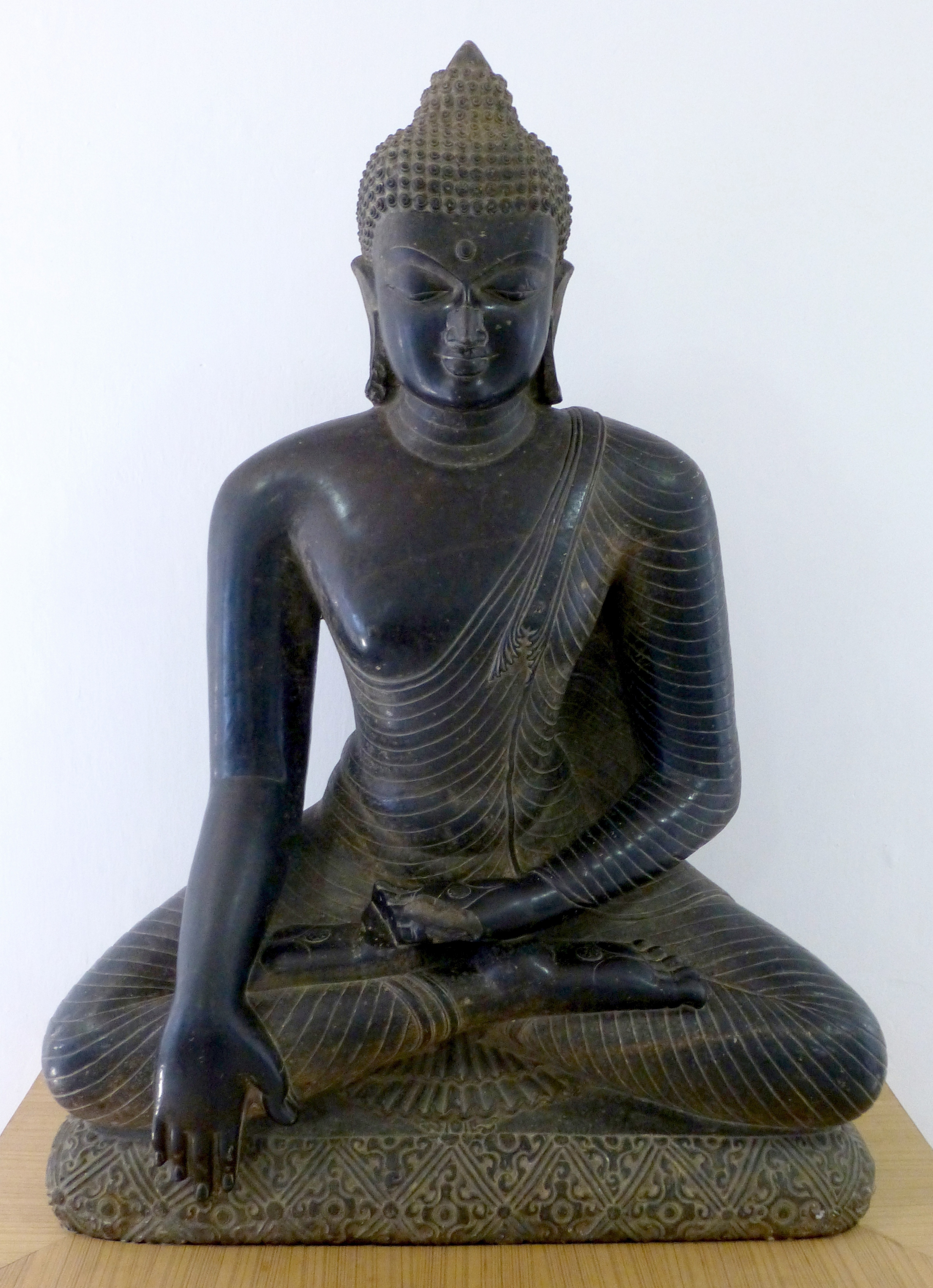
Buddha, Gaya, 10th Century

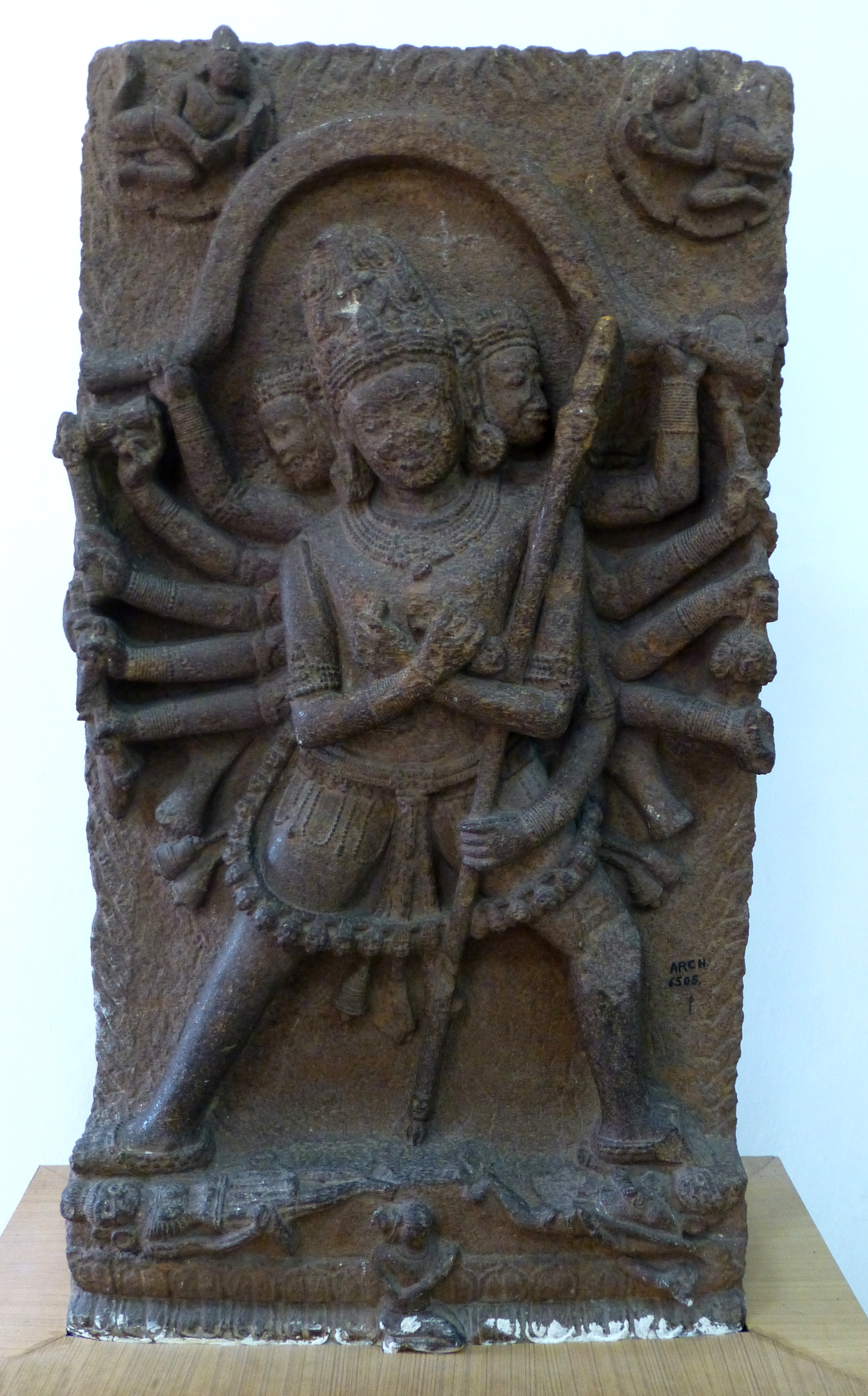
Samvara, Ratnagiri, 10th Century

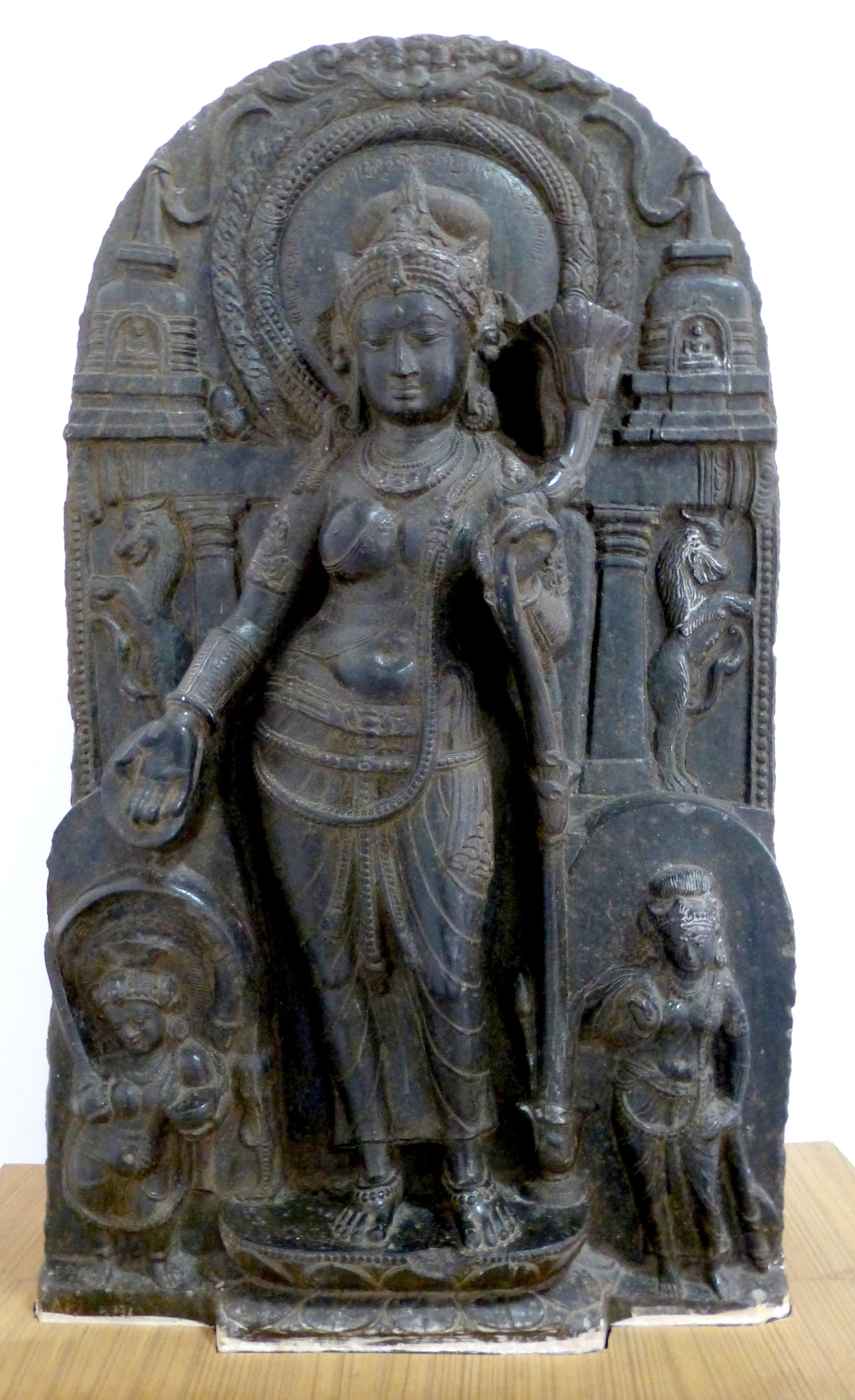
Tara, Gaya, 10th-11th Century

== See also ==
- International Museum Day
- Bihar Museum
- Jalan Museum
