= Statue of Mahatma Gandhi, Gandhi Maidan =

Monument in Patna, Bihar, India

Mahatma Gandhi
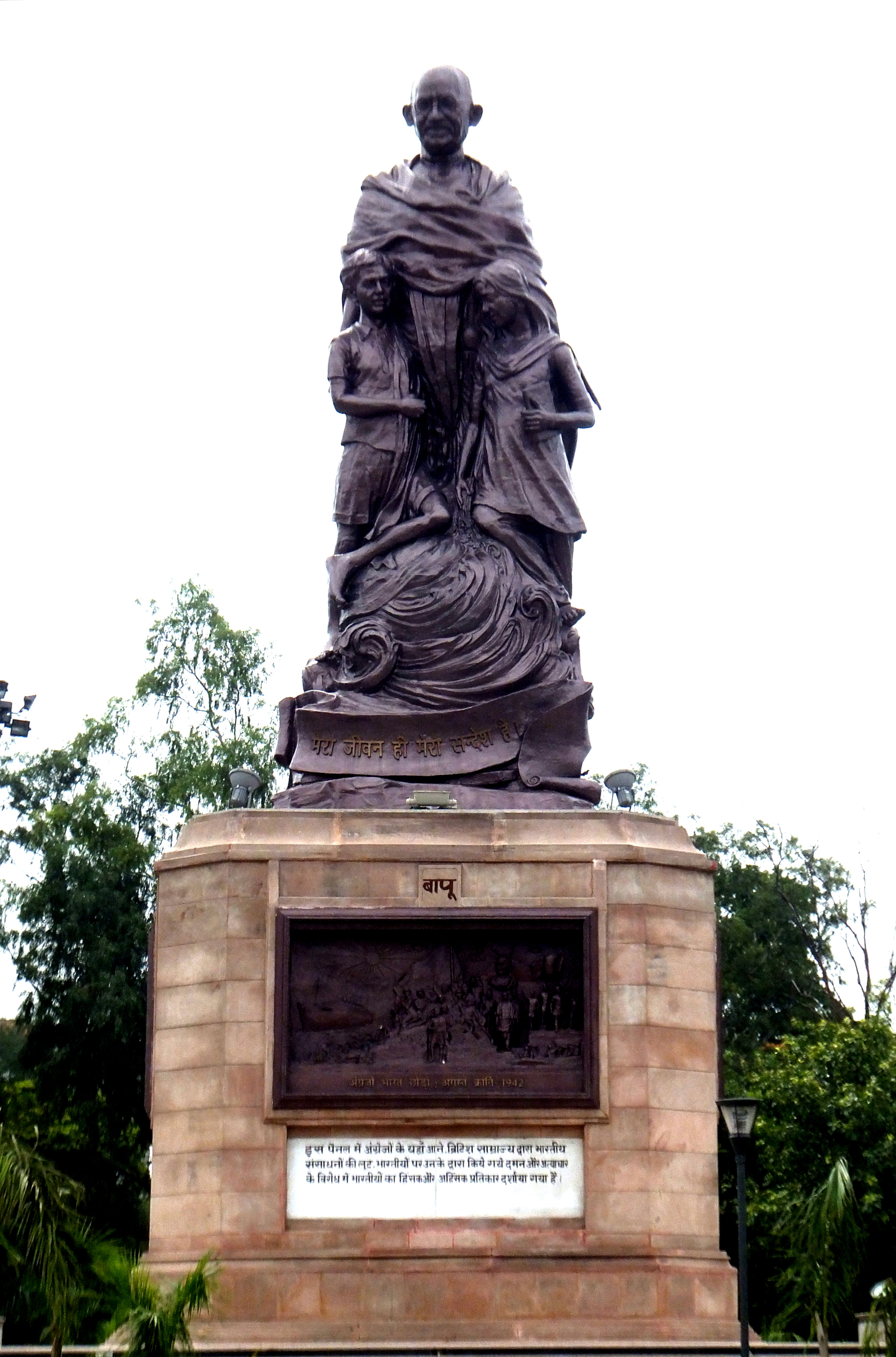
- Gandhiji standing affectionately with two children
- Interactive map of Mahatma Gandhi
- Location: Gandhi Maidan, Patna, Bihar, India
- Coordinates: 25°37′7″N 85°8′33″E
- Designer: Anil Sutar
- Type: statue
- Material: Bronze
- Height: 22 m (72 ft)
- Beginning date: 2012
- Completion date: 2013
- Opening date: 15 February 2013
- Dedicated to: Mahatma Gandhi

The statue of Mahatma Gandhi in Gandhi Maidan, Patna, is a public monument of India's father of Nation Mahatma Gandhi. The statue is the world's tallest bronze statue of Mahatma Gandhi. It was unveiled on 15 February 2013 by the then chief minister of Bihar, Nitish Kumar. It was established by Government of Bihar at a cost of ₹35 crore. The second tallest Gandhi statue turuvanur Chitradurga taluk and district karnataka

== Description ==
The statue is 72 feet (22 m) high with base and is made of bronze. It was sculpted by Ram Sutar's firm and is located on the western end of historic Gandhi Maidan, in front of St. Xavier's High School, Patna. It shows Mahatma Gandhi standing affectionately with two children. The pedestal is 24 feet (7.3 m) high with four landmark events of Gandhi's life, Dandi March in 1930, Quit India movement in 1942, Champaran Satyagraha in 1917 and charkha as symbol of Gandhi is inscribed on it in large letters.

Sculptor Anil, who runs Ramsutar Arts Pvt Ltd, said "the statue, showcasing Gandhi with a smiling look, will spread the message of world peace and motivate all to bridge the divide between the rich and poor."

== Gallery ==
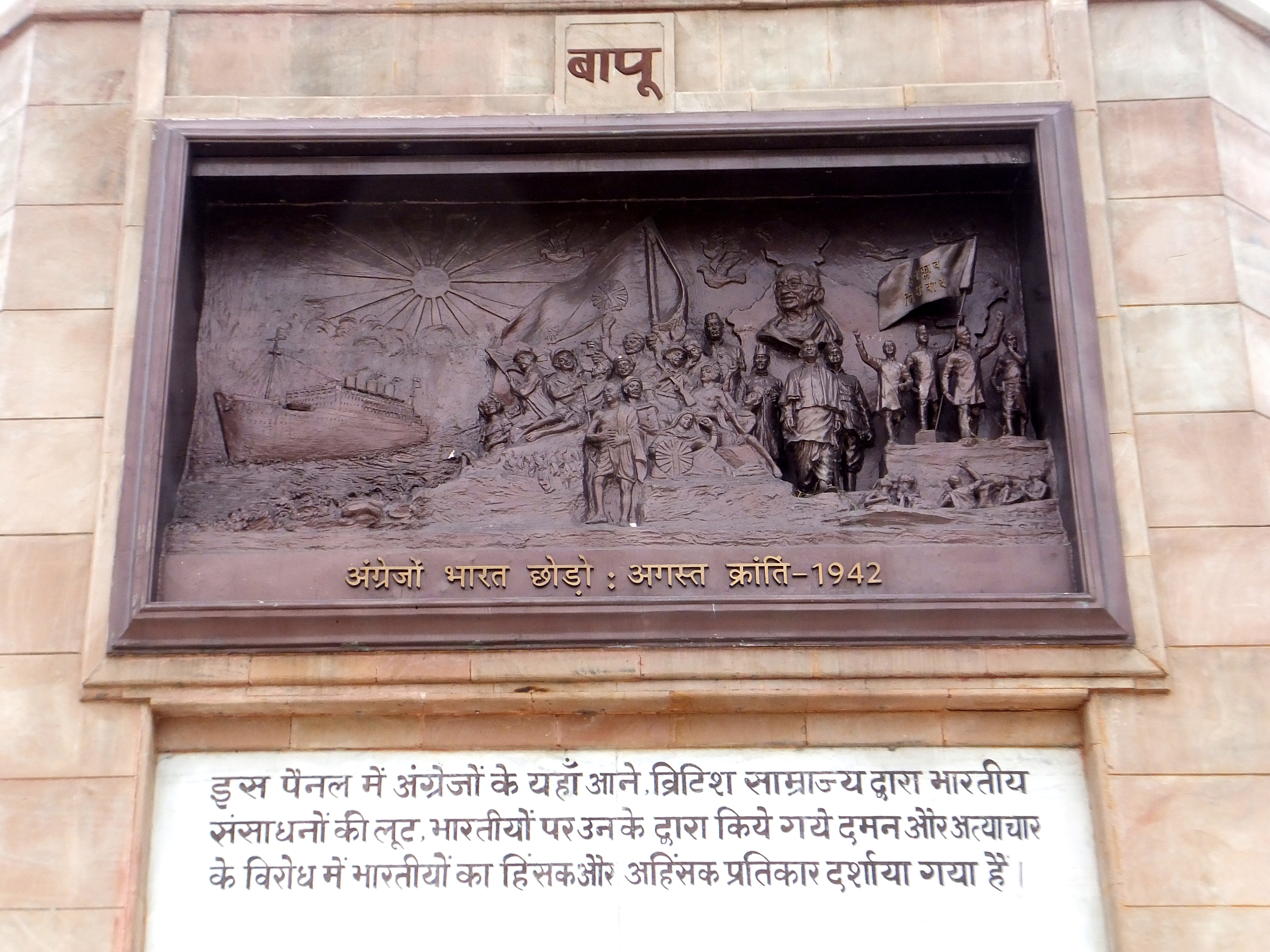

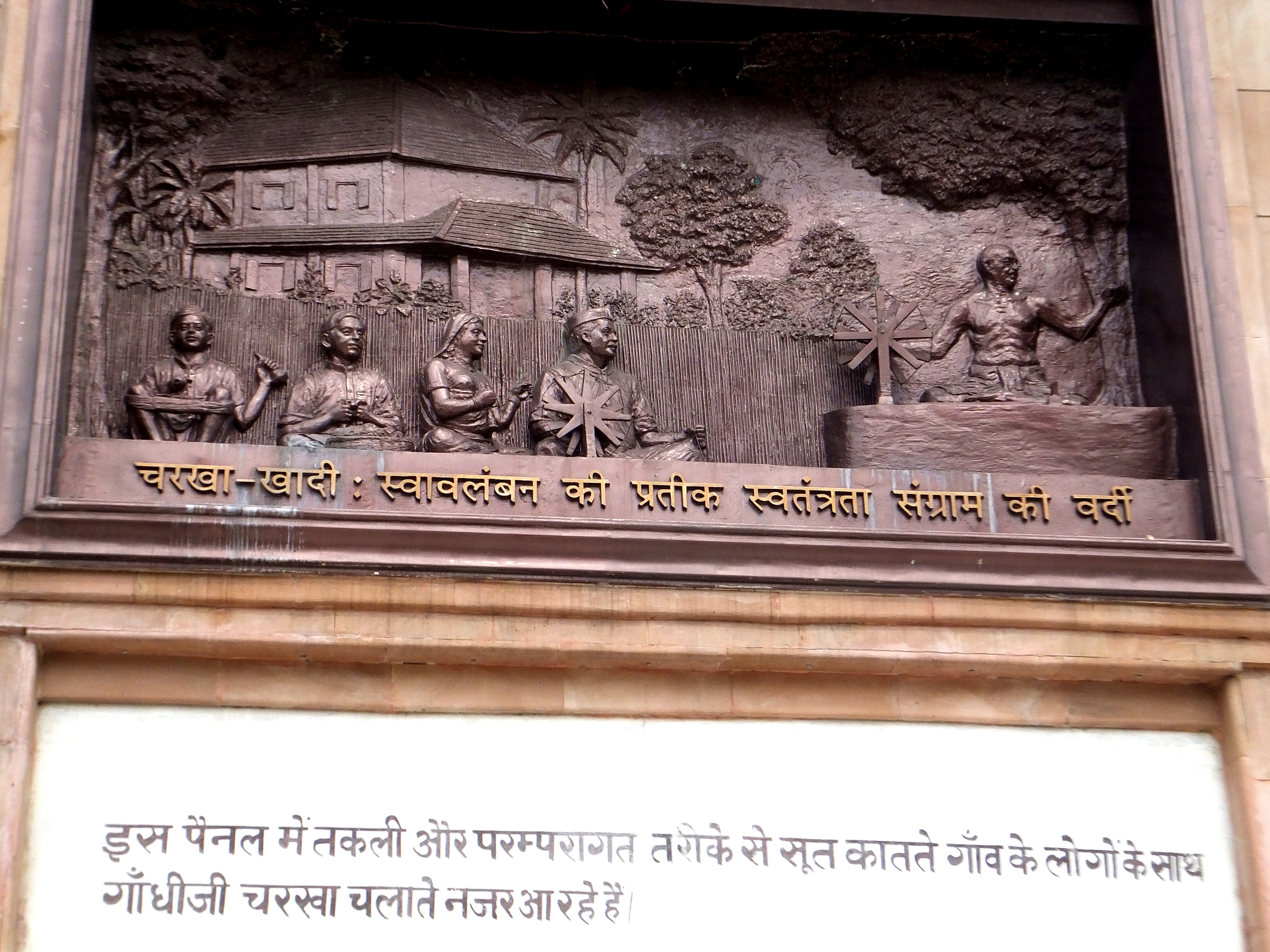

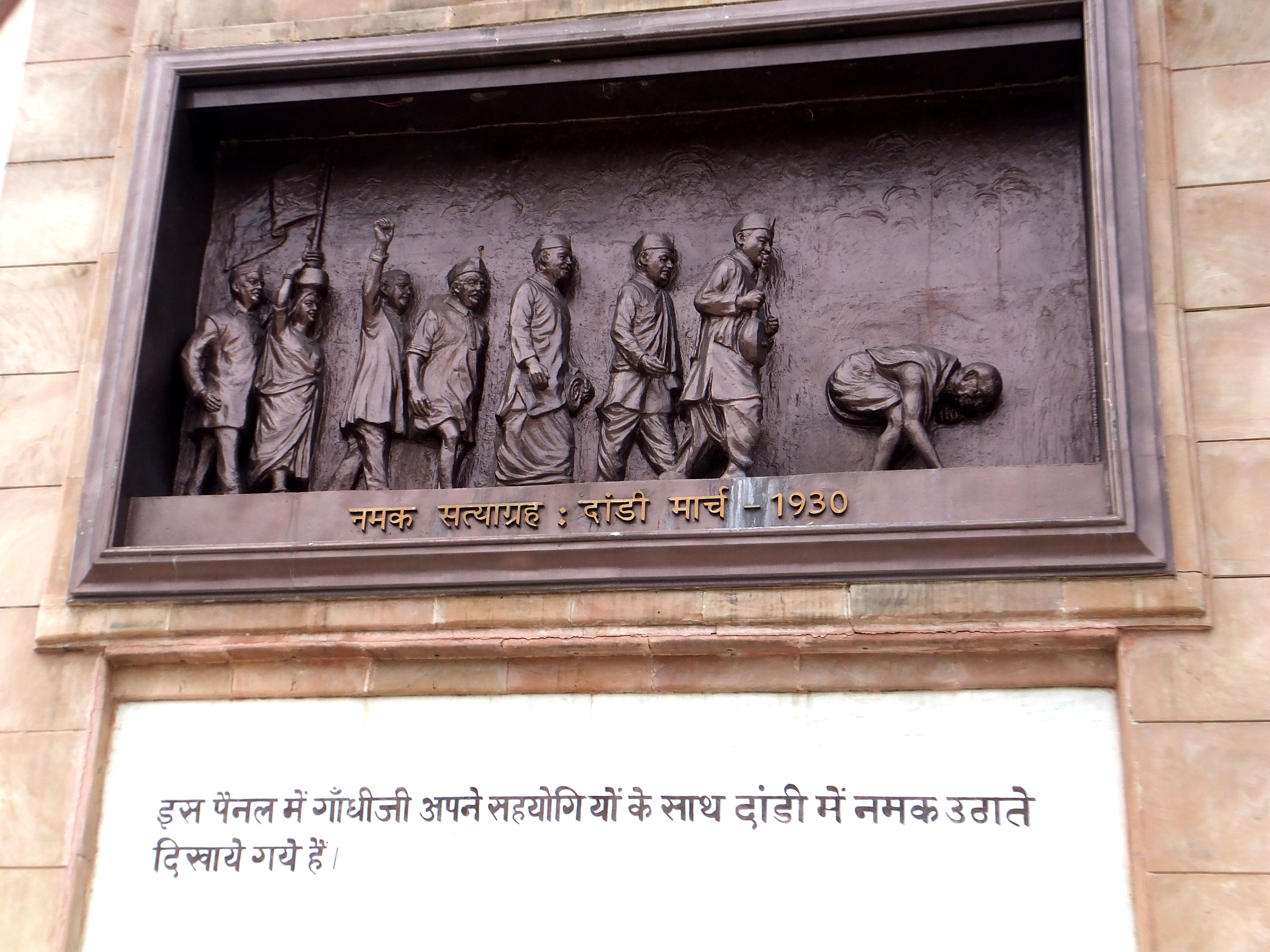

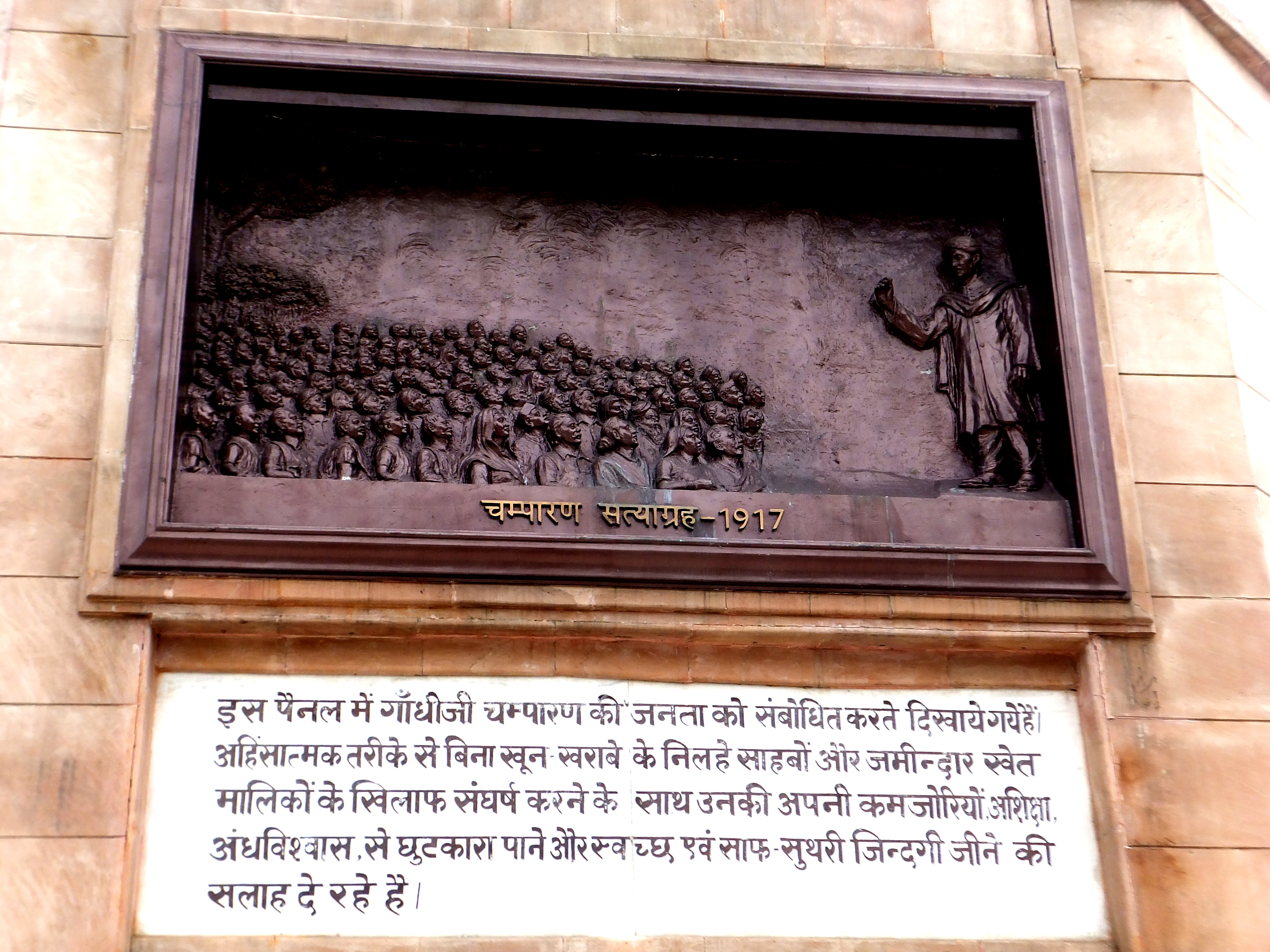

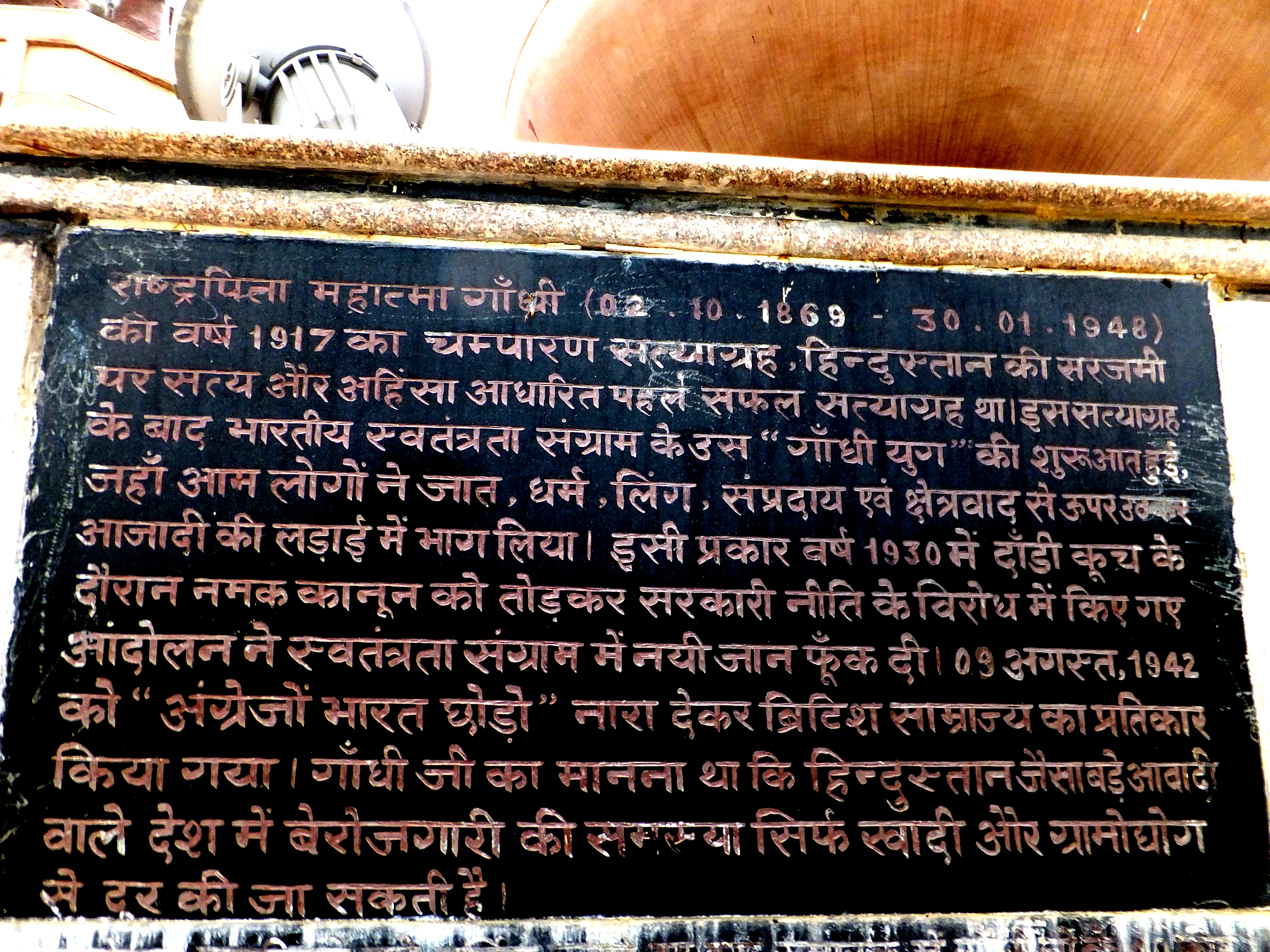

== See also ==
- Gandhi Sangrahalaya, Patna – Museum and memorial for Mahatma Gandhi
- List of artistic depictions of Mahatma Gandhi
