= Didarganj Yakshi =

Very early Indian stone statue

Coordinates: 25°34′18″N 85°15′45″E

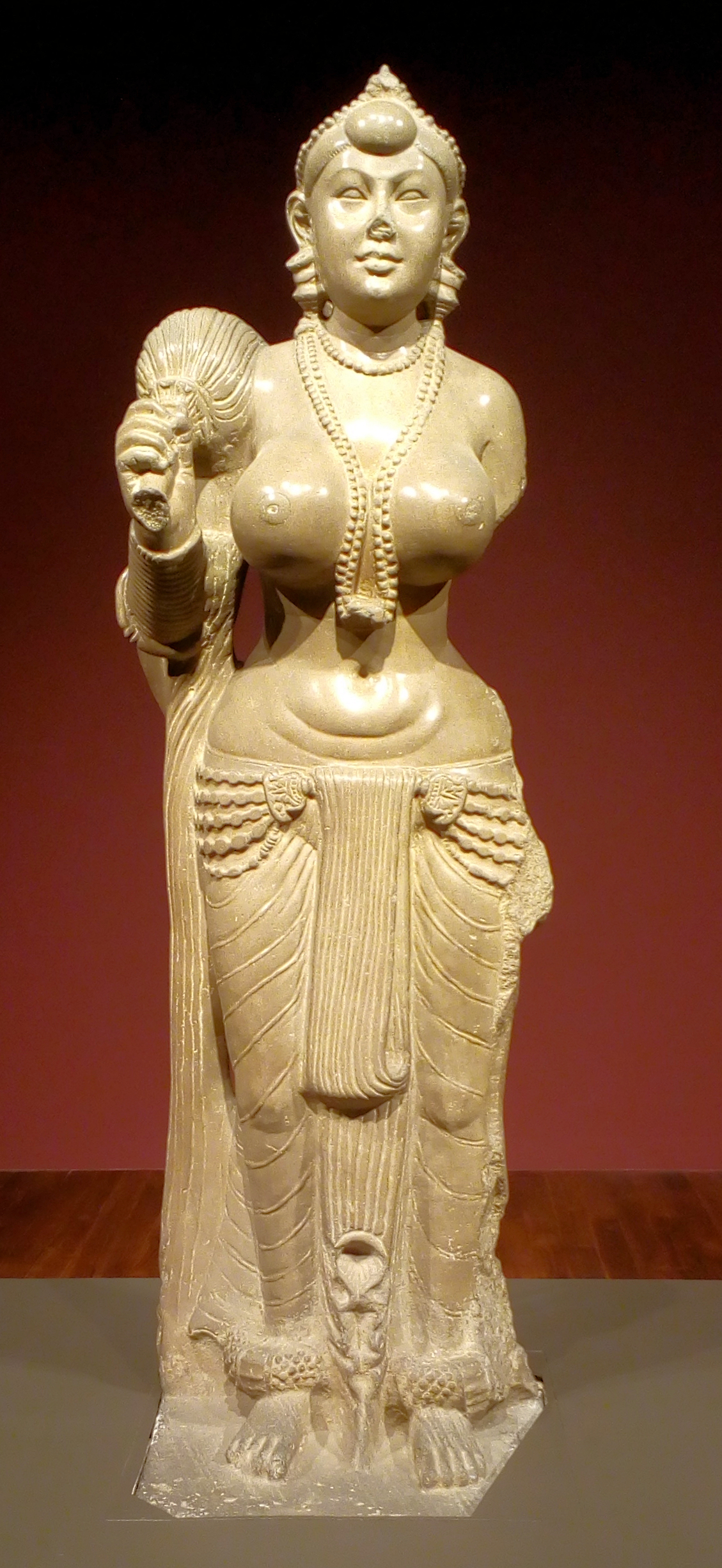
- Didarganj Yakshi (Chauri Bearer) with fly-whisk (chauri) is held in the right hand whereas the left hand is broken, in Bihar Museum.
- Material: Polished sandstone
- Height: 5 feet 2 inches (1.57 m)
- Period/culture: 3rd century BCE- 2nd century CE
- Discovered: 25°34'18"N 85°15'45"E
- Place: Didarganj, Patna, Bihar, India
- Present location: Bihar Museum, India

Location

The Didarganj Yakshi (or Didarganj Chauri Bearer; Hindi: दीदारगंज यक्षी) is one of the finest examples of very early Indian stone statues. It used to be dated to the 3rd century BCE, as it has the fine Mauryan polish associated with Mauryan art, but another Yakshi is also found but without polish so it is also dated to approximately the 2nd century CE, based on the similarity of analysis of shape and ornamentation, or the 1st century CE. The treatment of the forelock in particular is said to be characteristically Kushan.

The sculpture is now in the Bihar Museum in Patna, Bihar, India, close to where it was found in 1917. Patna, as Pataliputra, was also the Mauryan capital.

The statue is 5 feet 2 inches (1.57 m) tall on a pedestal of 1 foot 7.5 inches (49.5 cm) made of Chunar sandstone highly finished to a mirror-like polish. The life-size standing image is a tall, well-proportioned, free-standing sculpture made of sandstone with the well-polished surface associated with Mauryan polish, although this persisted for some time after the empire fell. The fly-whisk (chauri) is held in the right hand whereas the left hand is broken. The lower garment creates a somewhat transparent effect. Like many of the earliest large sculptures in Indian art, it represents a minor spiritual figure or deity, a yakshi, rather than one of the major deities.

== Context and style ==
Female yakshi or yakshini, and male yaksha, are very minor figures, on the borders of deity. Yakshi are often local spirits of water and trees. They are figures from Indian folk religion who were accepted into the pantheons of Buddhism, Hinduism and Jainism. In the earliest surviving Indian stone monumental sculptures, they, or at least figures identified by modern art historians as them, are very common subjects, preceding those of more significant deity figures. The Buddhist stupa sites of Sanchi and Bharhut both have many, those at Bharhut carrying inscriptions with their names.

The figure has the elements that would continue to be expected in female Indian religious statues "an elaborate headdress and jewellery, heavy spherical breasts, narrow waist, ample hips and a graceful posture ... [with] only sketchy attempts to portray such details of physical anatomy as musculature; rather it is a quality of inwardly held breath that is conveyed. This breath (prana) is identified with the essence of life...". For another scholar, the statue shows "for the first time the sculptural realization of a full and volumptuous form with a definite sense of its organic articulation". In contrast to the front, the "figure is flattened at the back with only a perfunctory indication of modelling".

According to a recent study the Didarganj Yakshi may represent the goddess Indrakshi Durga.

== Modern history ==
The Didarganj Yakshi was excavated on the banks of the Ganges River, at the hamlet of Didarganj Kadam Rasual, northeast of the Qadam-i-Rasul Mosque in Patna City, on 18 October 1917 by the villagers and by the noted archaeologist and historian, Professor J N Samaddar Professor Samaddar, with the help of the then president of Patna Museum Committee and member of Board of Revenue, Mr. E. H. C. Walsh and Dr. D. B. Spooner, the noted archaeologist, retrieved the figure in Patna Museum, Patna.

The statue's nose was damaged during a travelling exhibition, The Festival of India, en route to Smithsonian Institution and the National Gallery of Art, Washington, D.C., leading to a decision not to send it abroad again.

To celebrate the centenary year of the excavation, Sunita Bharti, a theatre director from Patna, produced and directed a play, Yakshini, in 2017. It was staged by the Indian Council for Cultural Relations (ICCR, Govt. of India) and the Indira Gandhi National Centre for the Arts (IGNCA, Govt. of India), New Delhi.

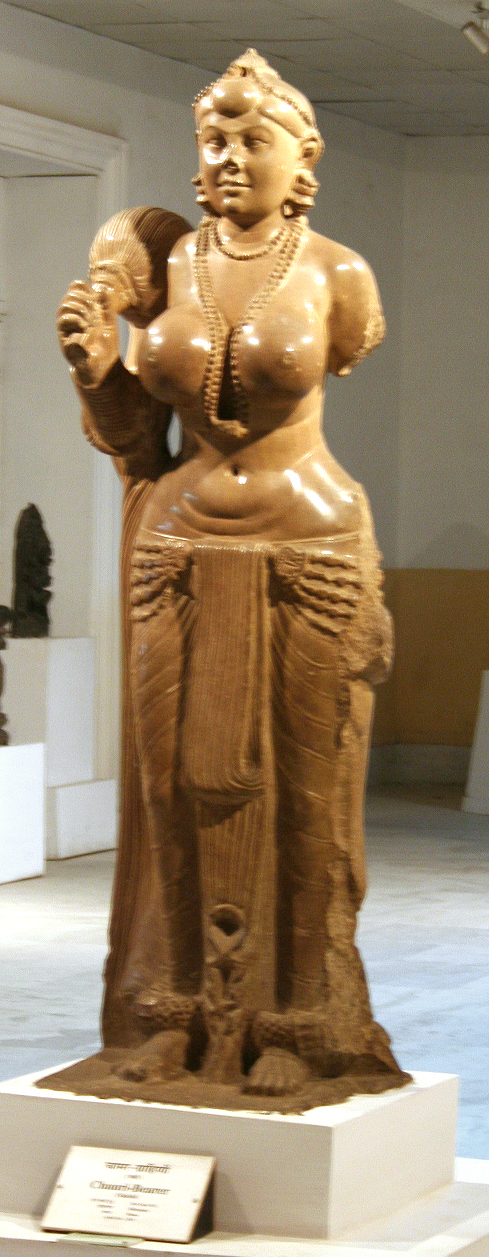
Another view, Bihar Museum.

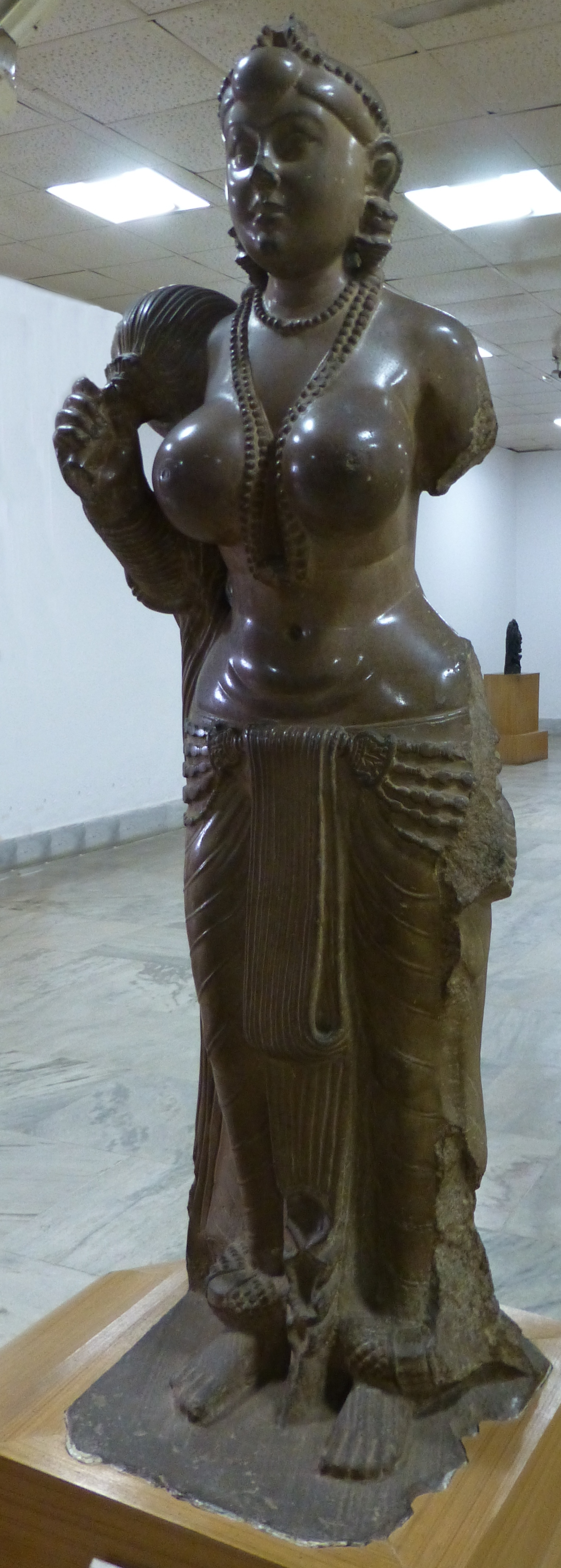
Another view, Bihar Museum.

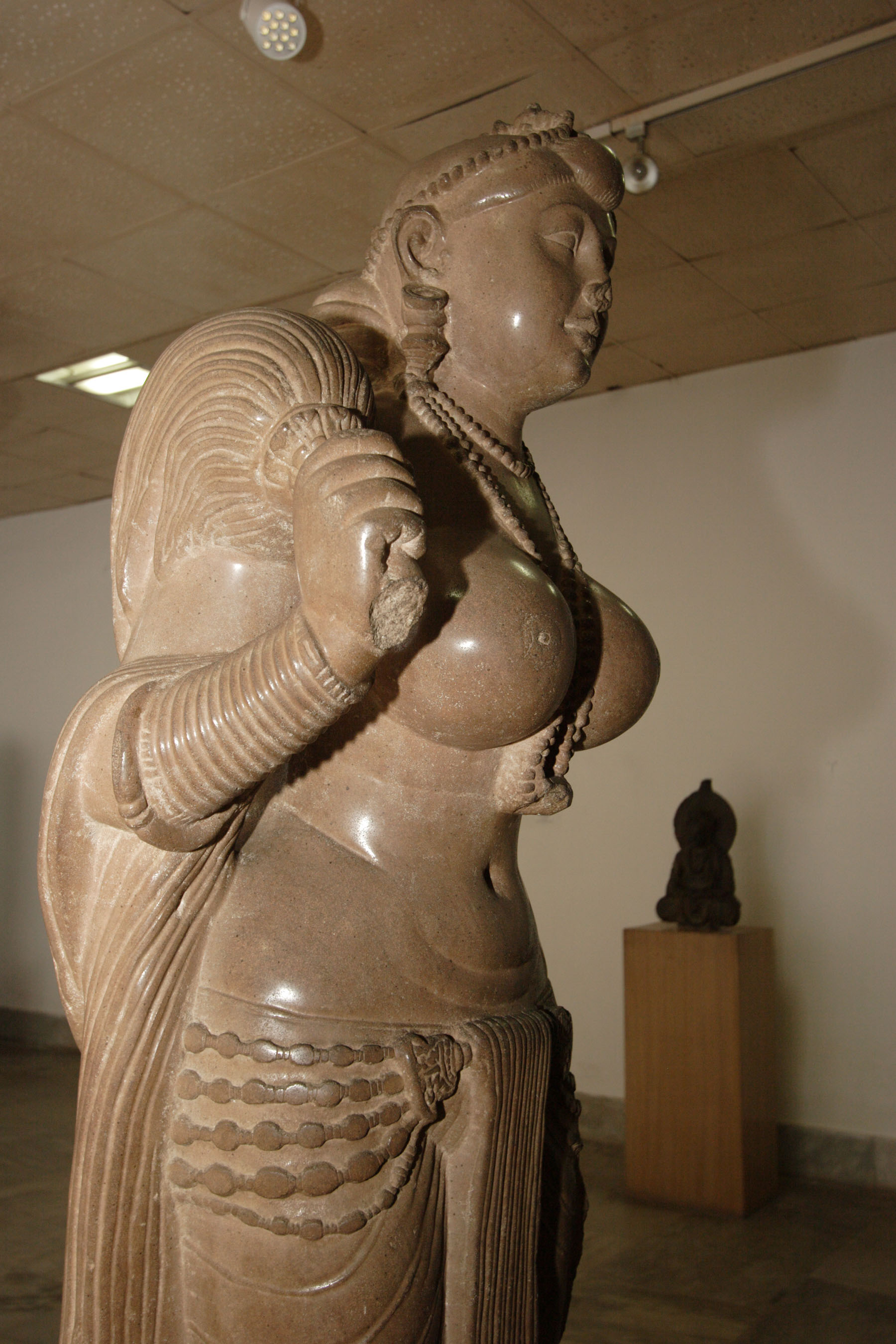
Side view.

== Related examples ==
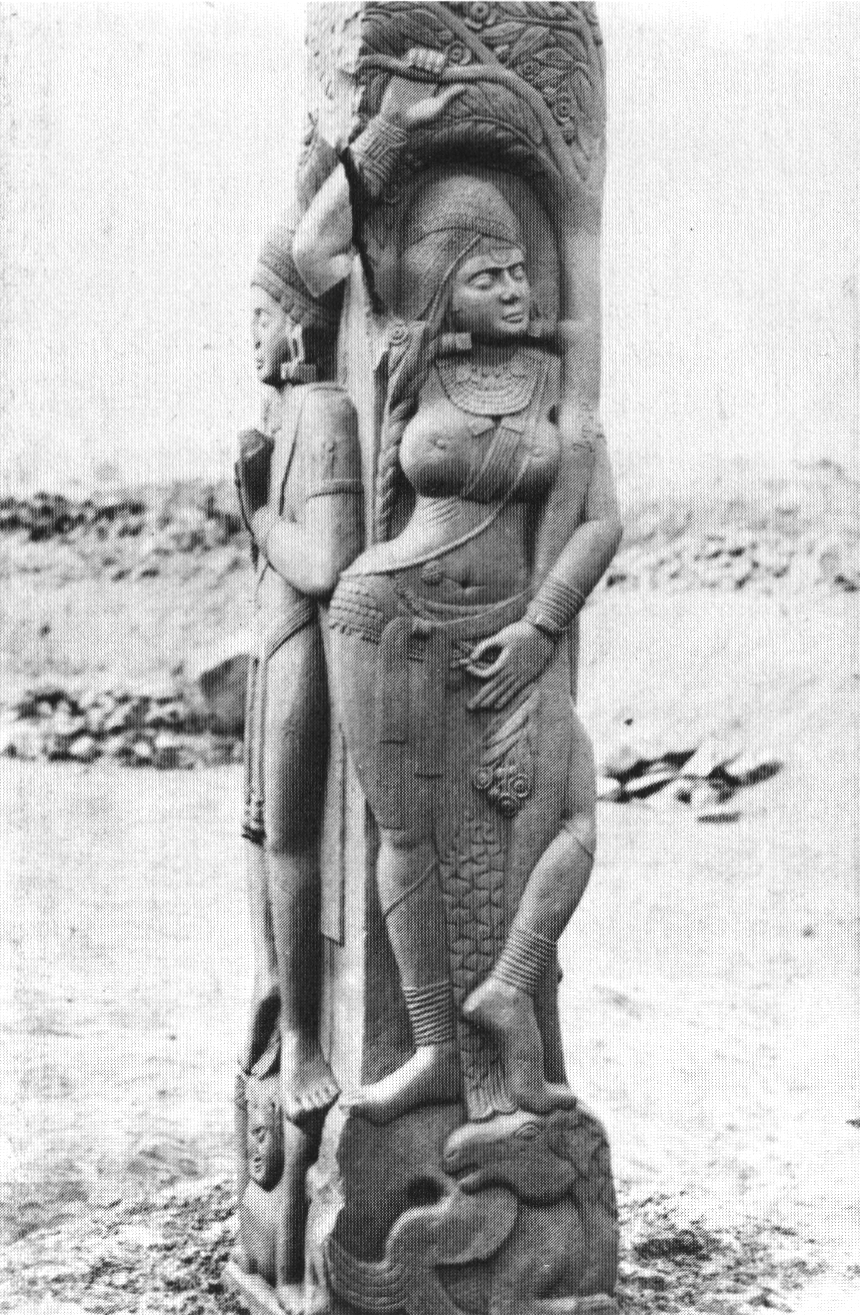
Yakshi with tree from Bharhut, perhaps 100 BCE.

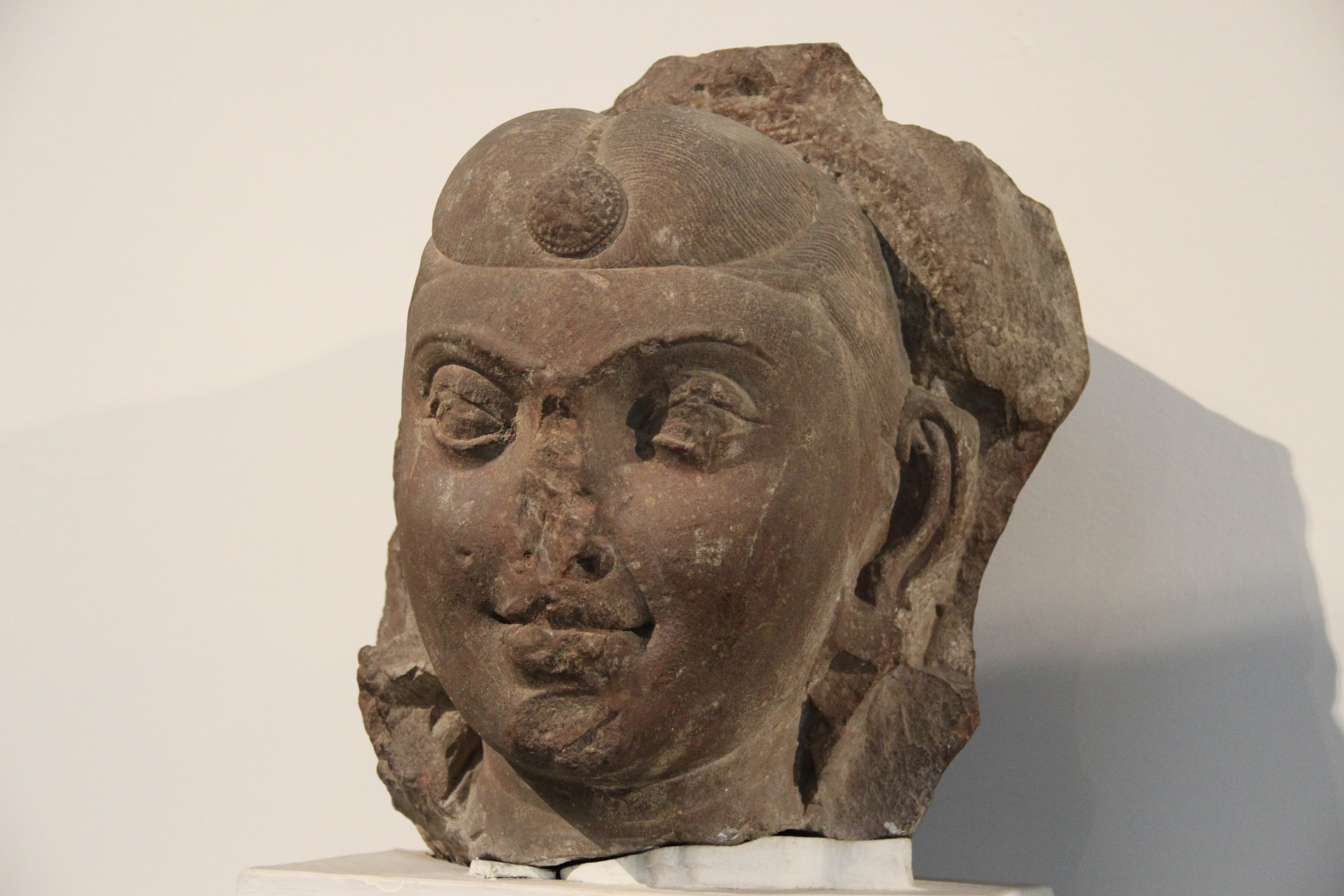
An example of hairstyle with frontal bun, under the Kushans

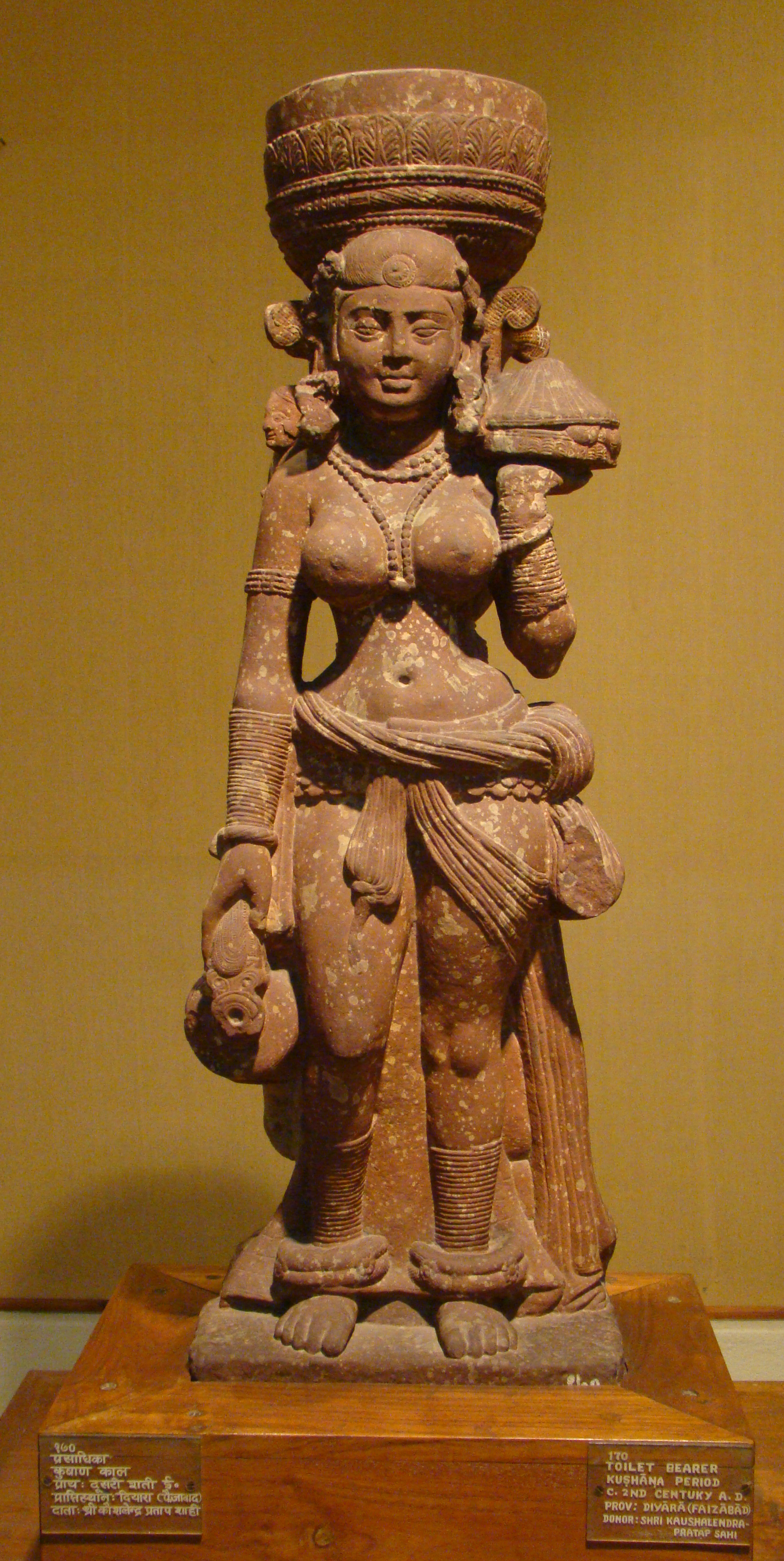
An example of statue under the Kushans (2nd century CE), Diyara (Faizabad) Benares Hindu University Museum.

== See also ==
- Lohanipur torso
