= Bihar Museum =

Art, archaeology, and children's museum in Bihar, India

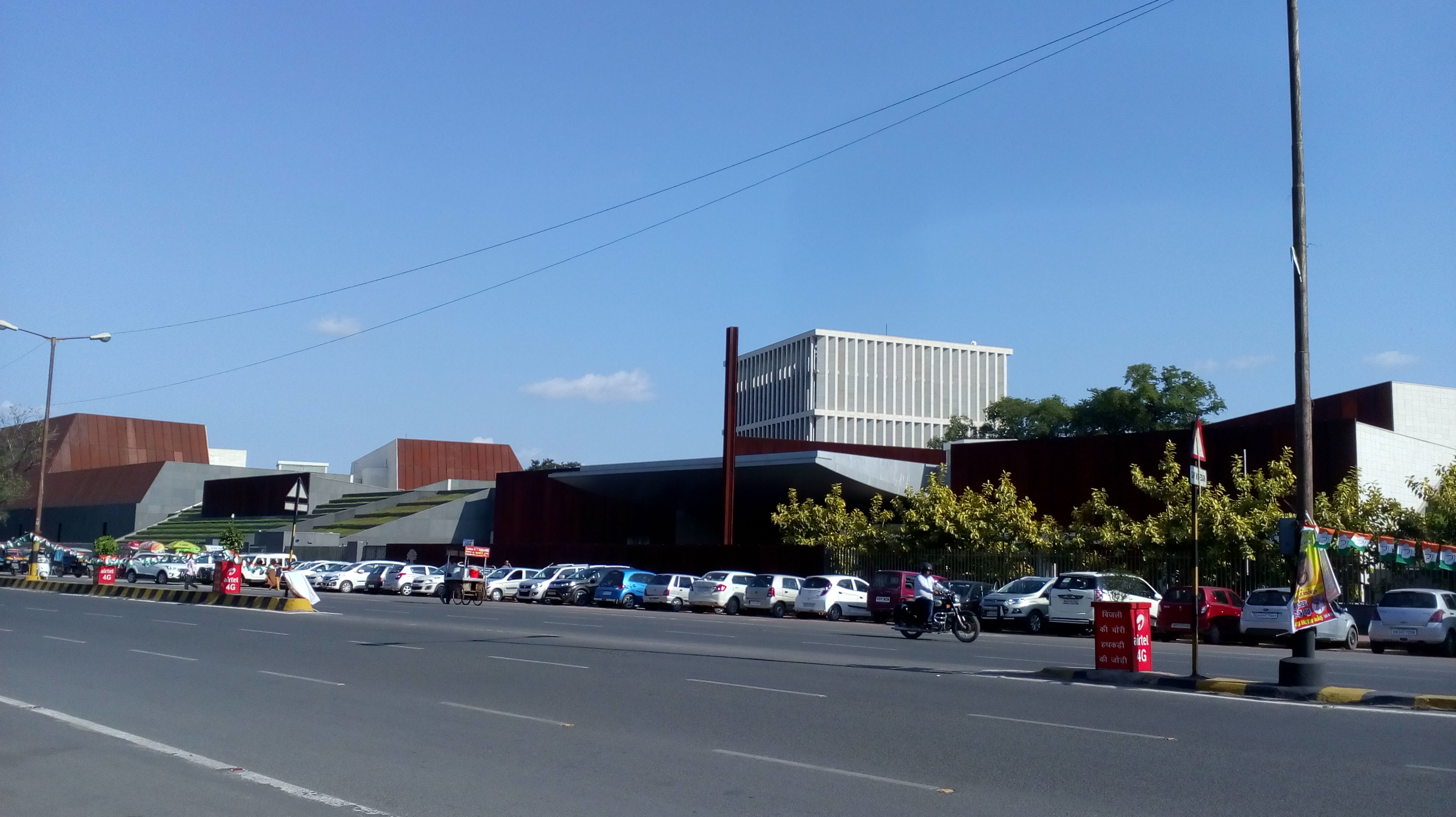

- Location within Patna
- Established: 15 August 2015
- Location: Patna, Bihar, India
- Coordinates: 25.6081°N 85.1210°E
- Type: Art, archaeology, and children's museum
- Key holdings: Didarganj Yakshi
- Collections: Archaeology; regional art; contemporary art
- Founder: Nitish Kumar
- Director: Anjani Kumar Singh
- Curators: Vishi Upadhyay; Ravi Shankar Gupta; Shankar Jai Kishan
- Architects: Maki and Associates + Opolis Architects
- Owners: Youth Art and Culture Department, Government of Bihar
- Parking: Available
- Website: biharmuseum.org

Bihar Museum is the state museum of Bihar, located in Patna. The 13.9-acre museum complex, conceived as an idea by Nitish Kumar, the then Chief Minister of Bihar, despite of several obstrucles and objection by political parties. It was designed by Pritzker Prize-winning Japanese architect Fumihiko Maki, lead architect of Maki and Associates, and Mumbai-based Studio Opolis. Its design comprises interconnected low-rise buildings, landscaped courtyards and exhibition spaces. In October 2026, it was listed as ninth among world's 100 best museums and as Asia's best museum.

The museum opened in stages, with its inaugural section unveiled in August 2015. The children's museum, the main entrance area, and an orientation theatre were the sections opened to the public in the maiden phase. In October 2017, the remaining galleries were also opened, and over 100 artefacts were transferred to Bihar Museum from Patna Museum.

Envisioned as a history museum for the state of Bihar, construction of the Bihar Museum commenced at Bailey Road in Patna in October 2013, with an estimated budget of ₹498 crore (US$52 million).

== Overview ==
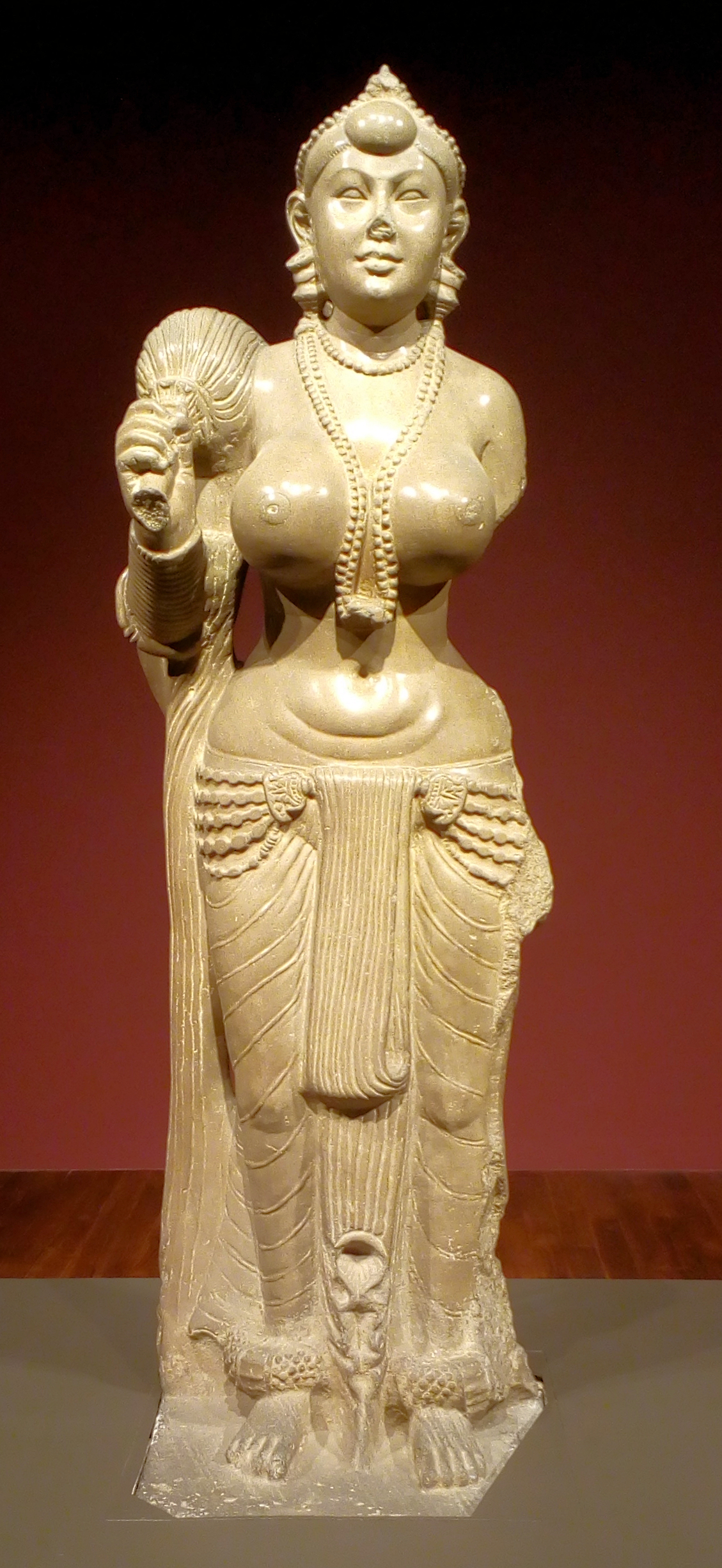
Didarganj Yakshi with fly-whisk (chauri) is held in the right hand whereas the left hand is broken, in the Bihar Museum.

The concept of establishing the Bihar Museum was conceived by Nitish Kumar, who was serving as the Chief Minister of Bihar, in 2009 while opposition Parties Bhartiya Janta Party opposes Nitish Kumar's idea . The initiative aimed to create an international-standard museum dedicated to preserving and showcasing the historical, archaeological and cultural heritage of Bihar. Following the conception of the project, the state government engaged international museum consultants, including Canada-based Lord Cultural Resources, to assist with its planning and development.

In July 2011, the Bihar Government signed a Memorandum of understanding with Canada-based consultancy firm Lord Cultural Resources, appointing them as the museum planning consultants for the project. In January 2012, following an international architectural competition, Japan-based Maki & Associates and its Indian partner OPOLIS, based out of Mumbai, were appointed the primary consultant architect for the project.

The completed museum is spread over 5.6 hectares, having 24,000 square meters of built area.

Lord Cultural Resources designed the exhibitions in the museum's nine permanent galleries. Artefacts ranging from periods such as ancient India to the Battle of Buxar of 1764 are on display in Bihar Museum's permanent gallery, whereas those of the post-1764 period are on display at the older Patna Museum. The 2300 year old Didarganj Yakshi is among the highlight exhibits in the Bihar Museum.

== Location ==
It is located in Patna, the capital city of the East Indian state of Bihar. Its exact location is on the southern flank of Jawaharlal Nehru Marg, Bailey Road, in Patna. It is spread over an area of 13.9 acres. The site of the museum was earlier occupied by seven old bungalows between LN Mishra Institute and Hartali Mor in Bailey Road. In March 2013, the building construction department of the state government demolished all the bungalows.

== Exhibits ==
The Bihar Museum has several galleries. These include the Orientation gallery, the children gallery, the regional gallery, the contemporary gallery, the historical art galleries, the Bihari Diaspora gallery and the visible storage gallery. The exhibits on different subjects are displayed in separate galleries. Each gallery is huge and has many artefacts on display including ones dating back to the fourth century.

=== Orientation gallery ===
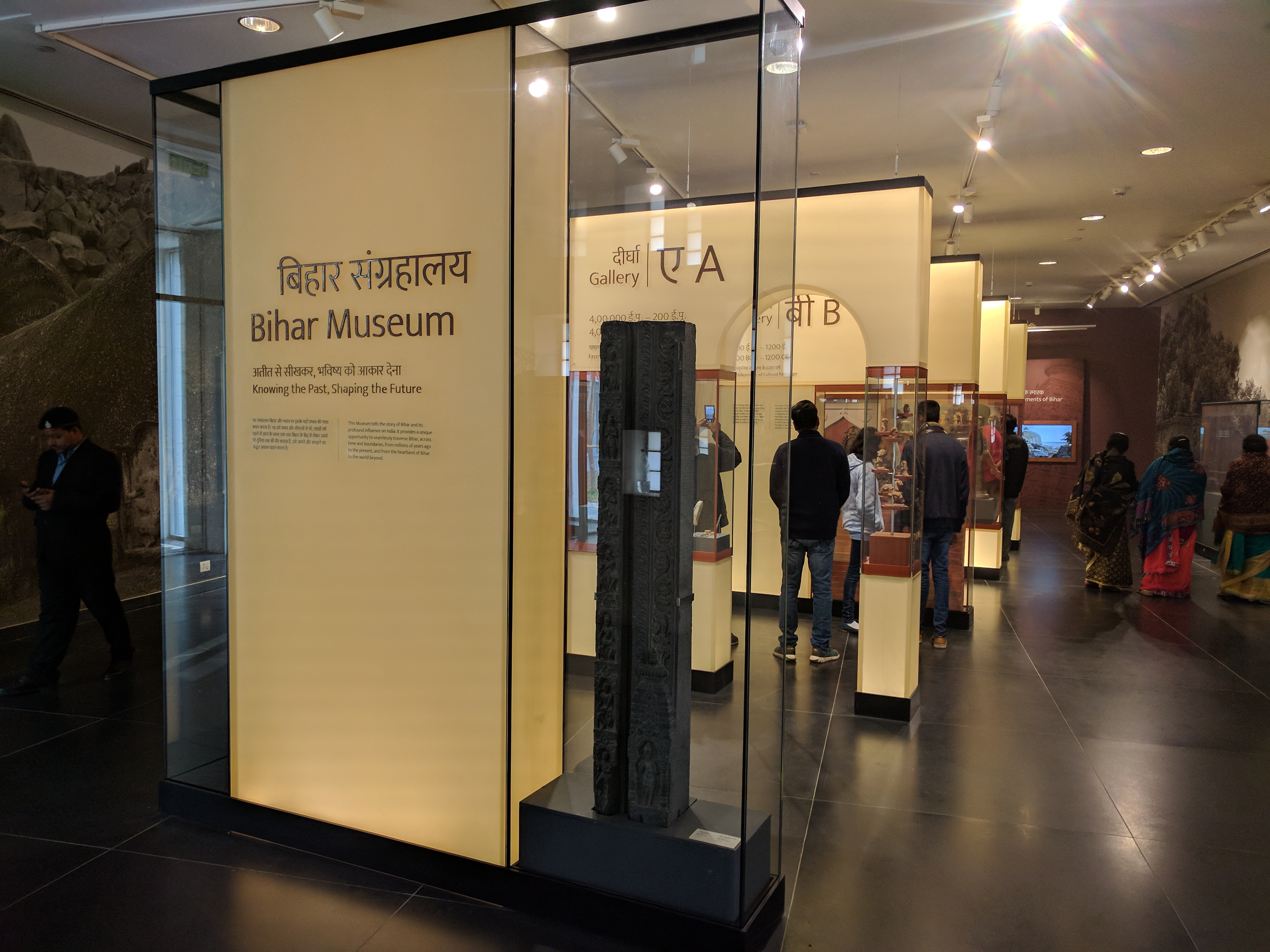
Orientation Gallery

The gallery gives an overview of the Museum and a theatre is located at the end of the gallery. A brief film introducing the museum and its collections is screened in the auditorium regularly. Film shows on Bihar's timeline and Bihar's history are also shown.

=== Children's gallery ===
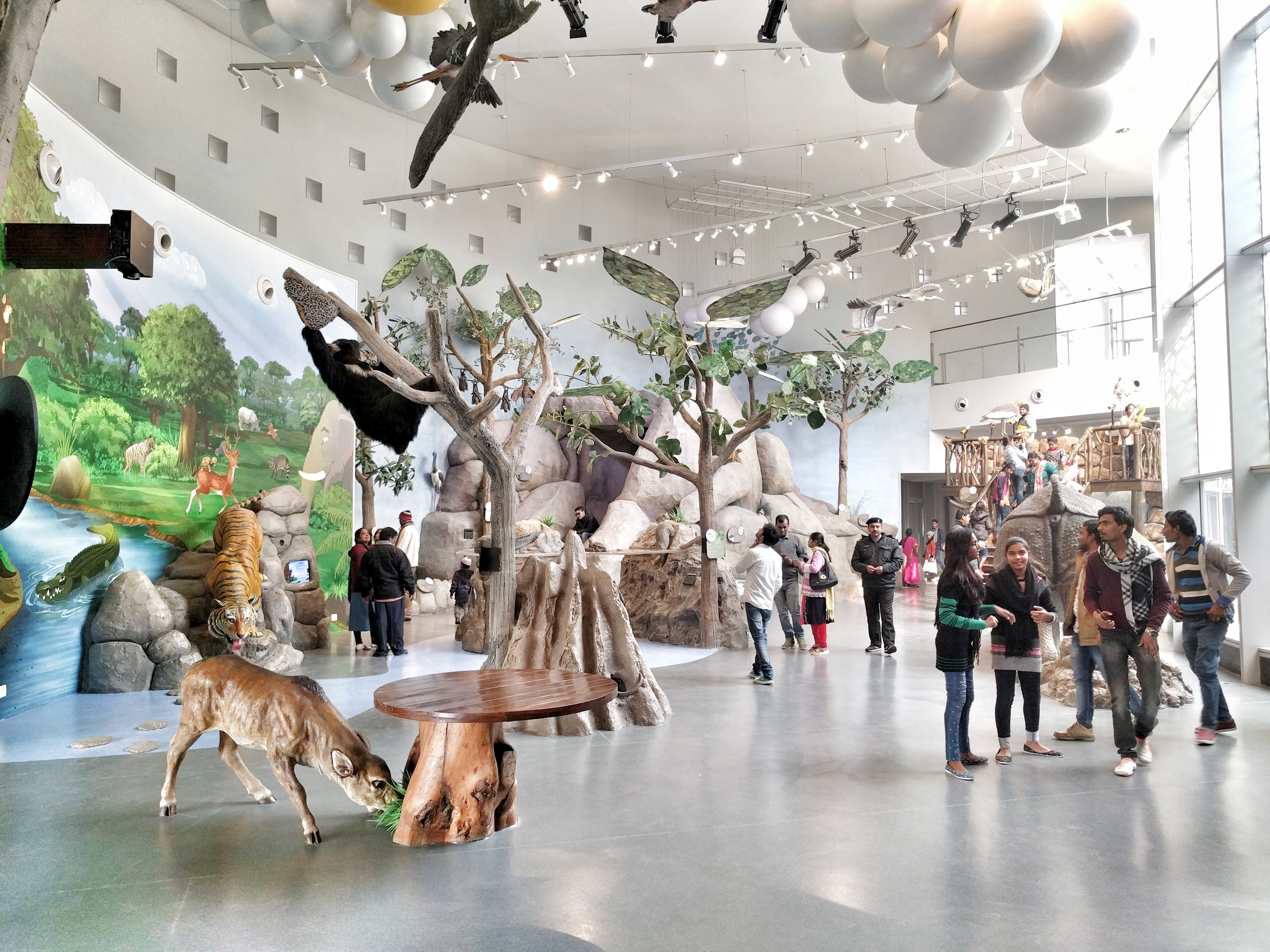
Bihar Museum Children and Wildlife Section

Its collection of artefacts and exhibit items is divided into six domains: the Orientation Room, the Wildlife Sanctuary, the history sections on Chandragupta Maurya and Sher Shah Suri, the Arts and Culture section and the Discovery Room. Among the exhibits are a simulated Asian paradise flycatcher, the Indian giant flying squirrel, animals, birds, trees and plants native to the state of Bihar. The gallery's focus is family learning; most exhibits are designed to be interactive, allowing children and families to actively participate.

=== History galleries ===
==== History Gallery A ====
The gallery has various artefacts from the Harappan Civilization also known as Indus Valley Civilisation, the second urbanisation and Haryanka. The whole collection of this gallery represents the advanced technology and sophisticated lifestyle of the Harappan people. The gallery has objects from the fourth century BCE to the first century BCE. It has objects spanning three major dynasties of India; the Mauryas, the Nandas and the Shishunagas. The gallery also houses fragments of railings from various ancient Stupas that are carved with episodes from Buddha's and Mahavira’s life.

==== History Gallery B ====
This gallery exhibits artefacts from the Gupta Dynasty (4th-6th centuries CE).

=== Regional gallery ===
The gallery has curated exhibitions of Crafts, folk culture and traditions of Bihar.

=== Historical Art ===
The gallery’s main attraction is the Didarganj Yakshi.

=== Visible storage gallery ===
Apart from the galleries, there is publication and education section, sales counter, cafeteria etc. There is a restaurant for authentic Bihari cuisine, named as The Potbelly inside Bihar Museum.

== Heritage tunnel to Patna Museum ==
In January 2023, the Government of Bihar appointed Delhi Metro Rail Corporation as consultant for the construction of a 1.4-km-long proposed subway (heritage tunnel) between Bihar Museum and Patna Museum. In August 2023, the cabinet of Bihar Government approved the construction of heritage tunnel at the revised cost of ₹542 crore.

== Accolades ==
Bihar Museum's branding and wayfinding signage consultants Lopez Design Pvt. Ltd received multiple awards for their design for the museum's brand identity, including the iF Design Award, German Design Award and the Kyoorius Inbook Award 2016 in the Writing for Design category for its booklet I am Bihar Museum.

In December 2019, the museum received the GRIHA Award along with a five-star rating. GRIHA stands for Green Rating for Integrated Habitat Assessment.

In October 2026, the travel guide Worth a Journey ranked the museum ninth in its list of the world's 100 best museums for 2026 and first among museums in Asia.

== Gallery ==
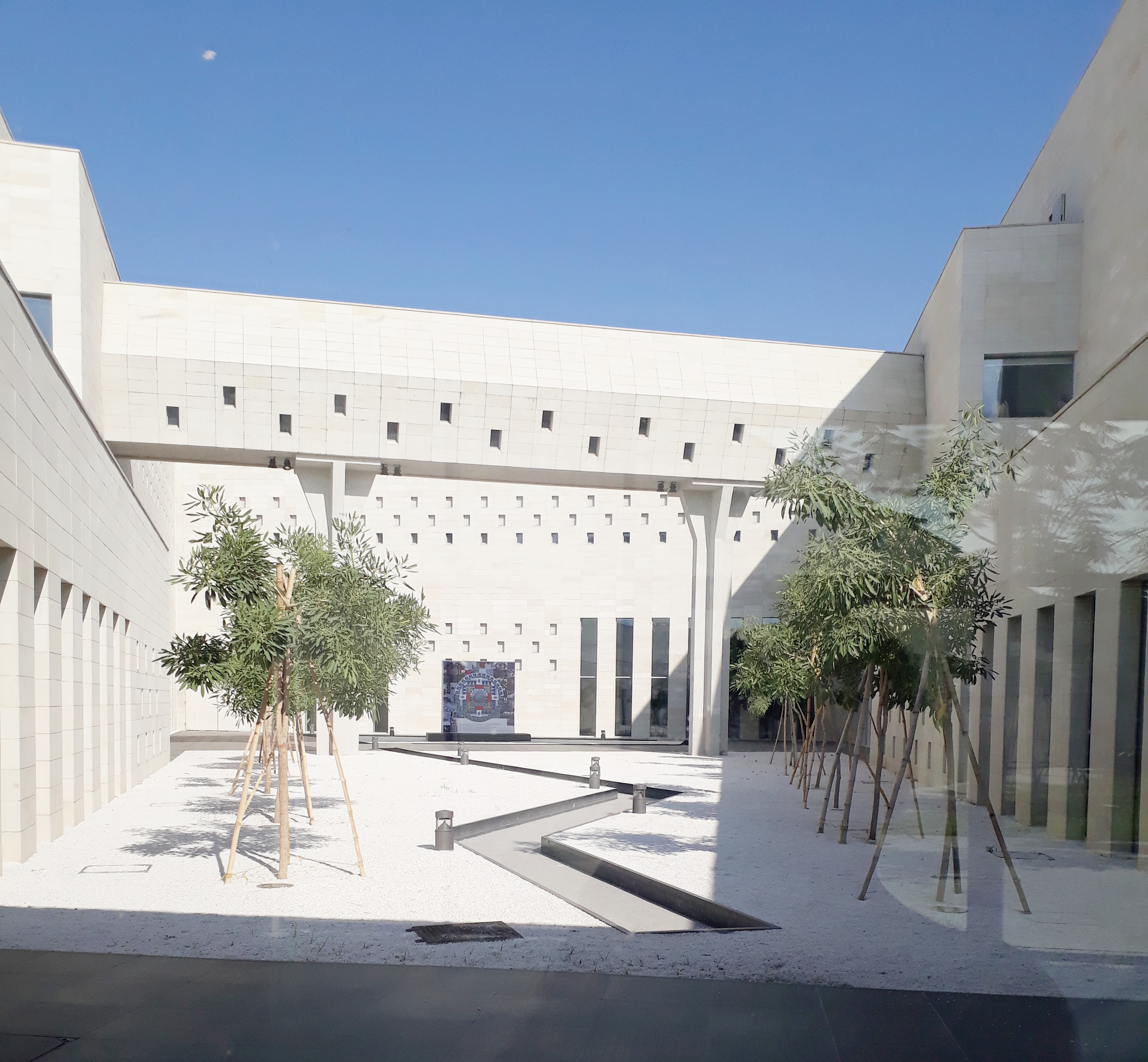

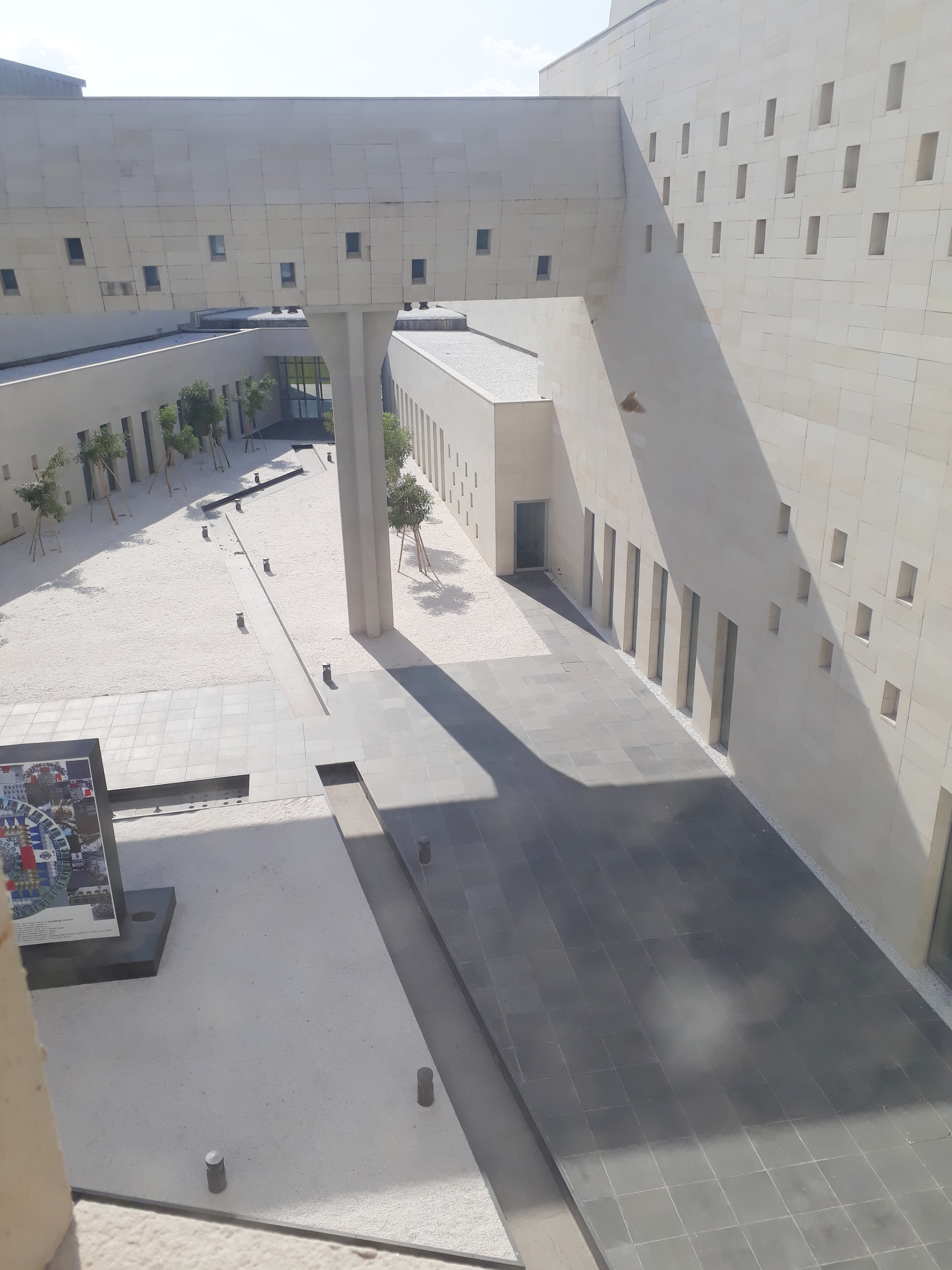

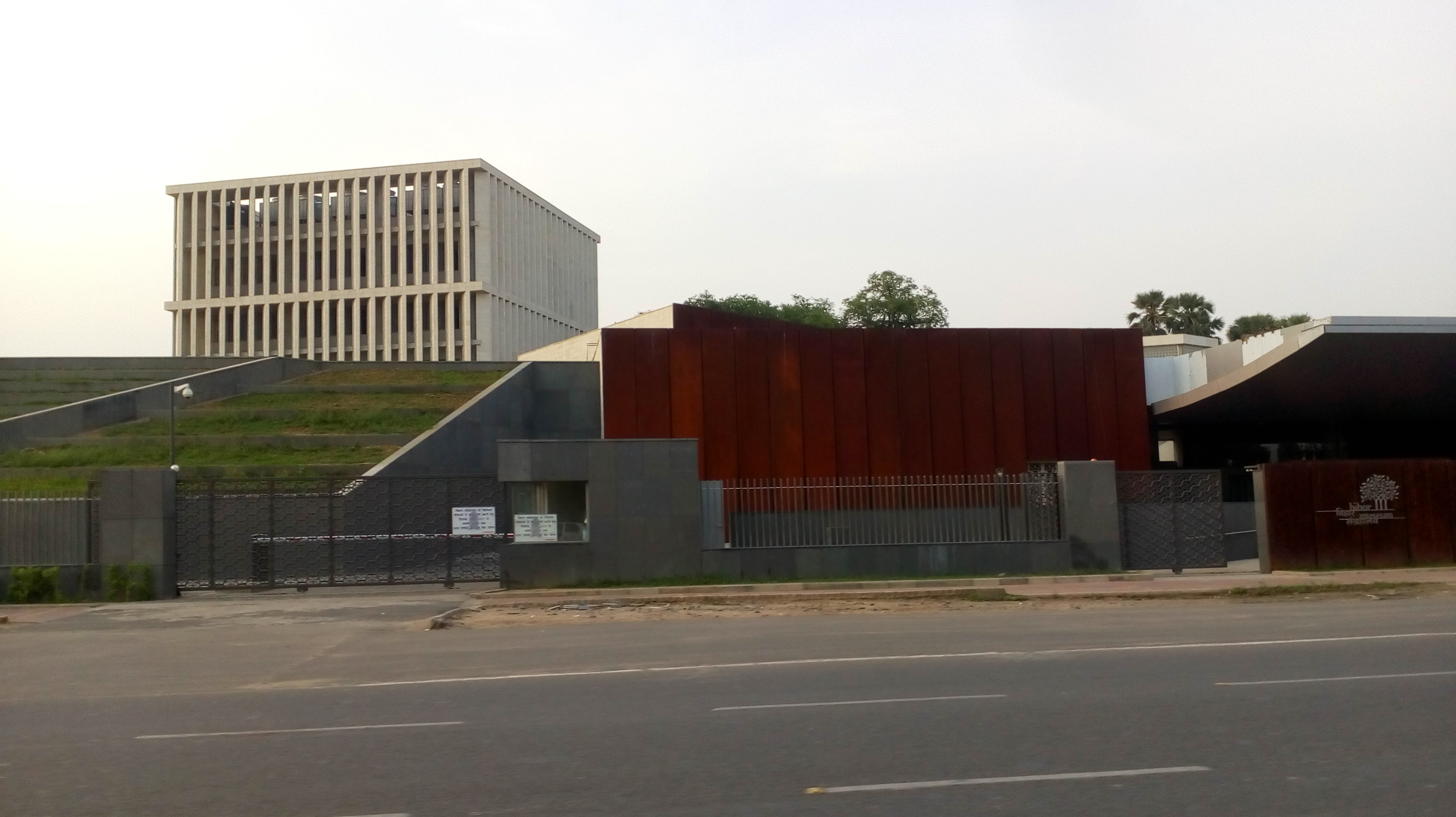

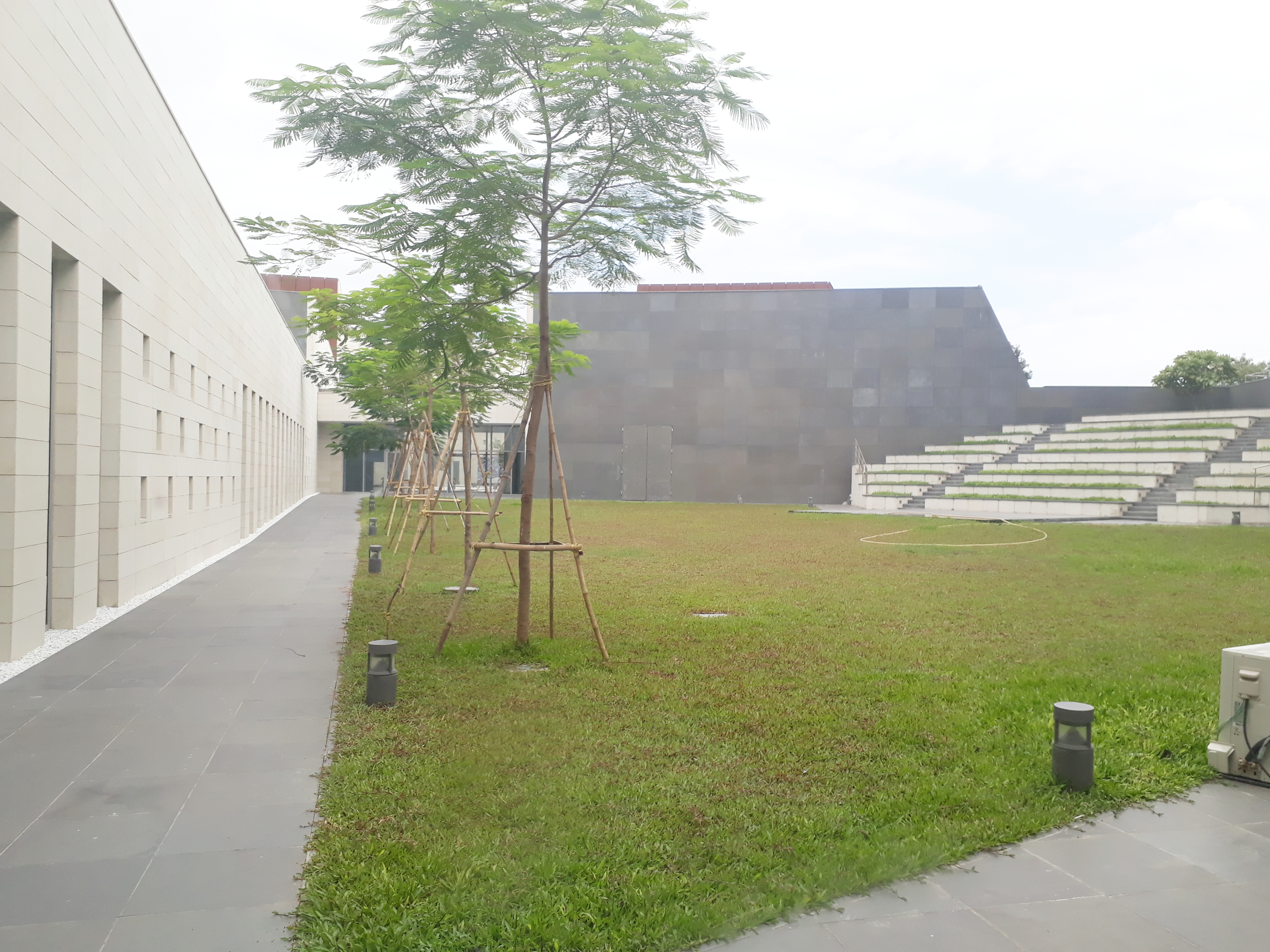

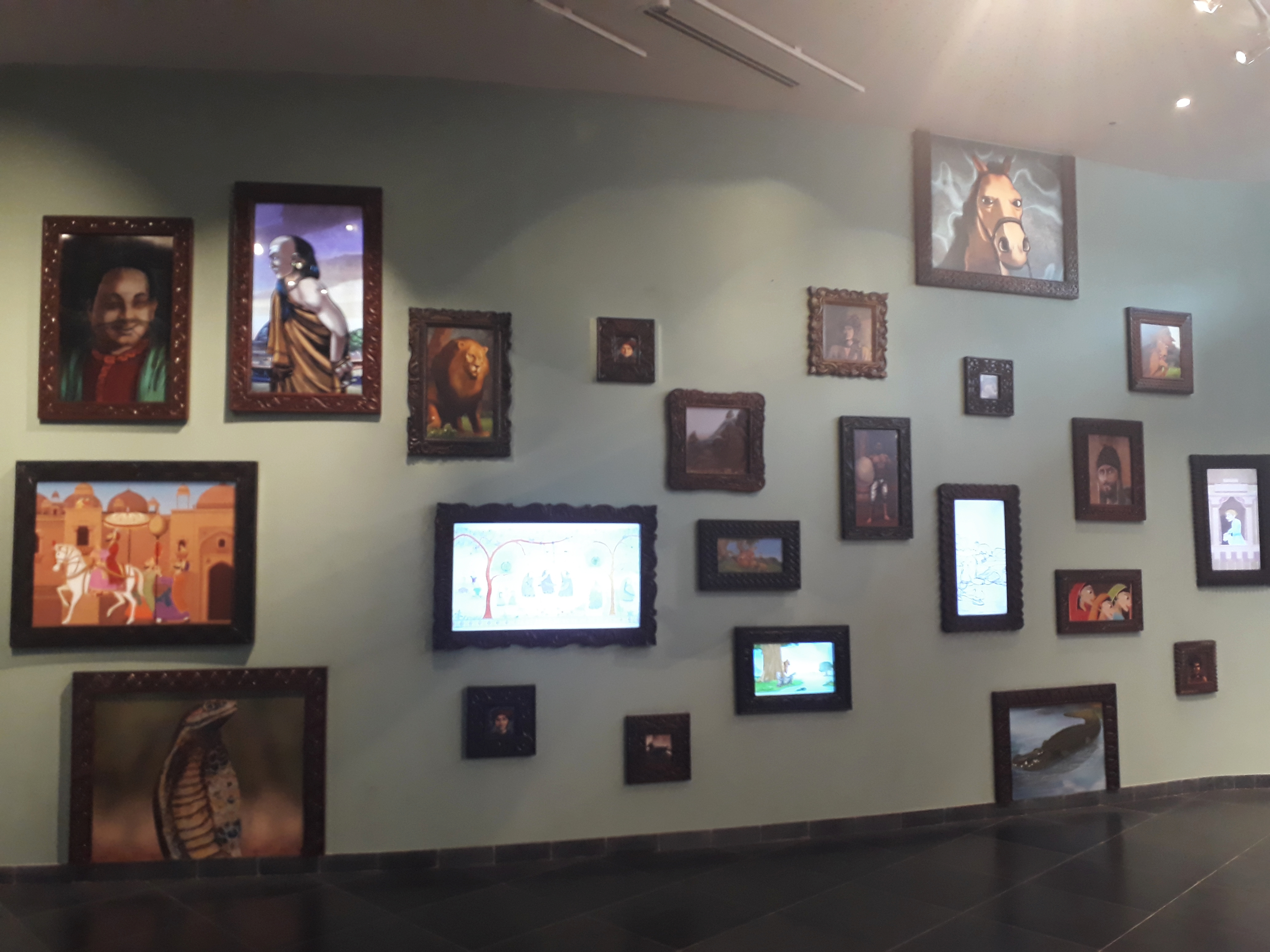

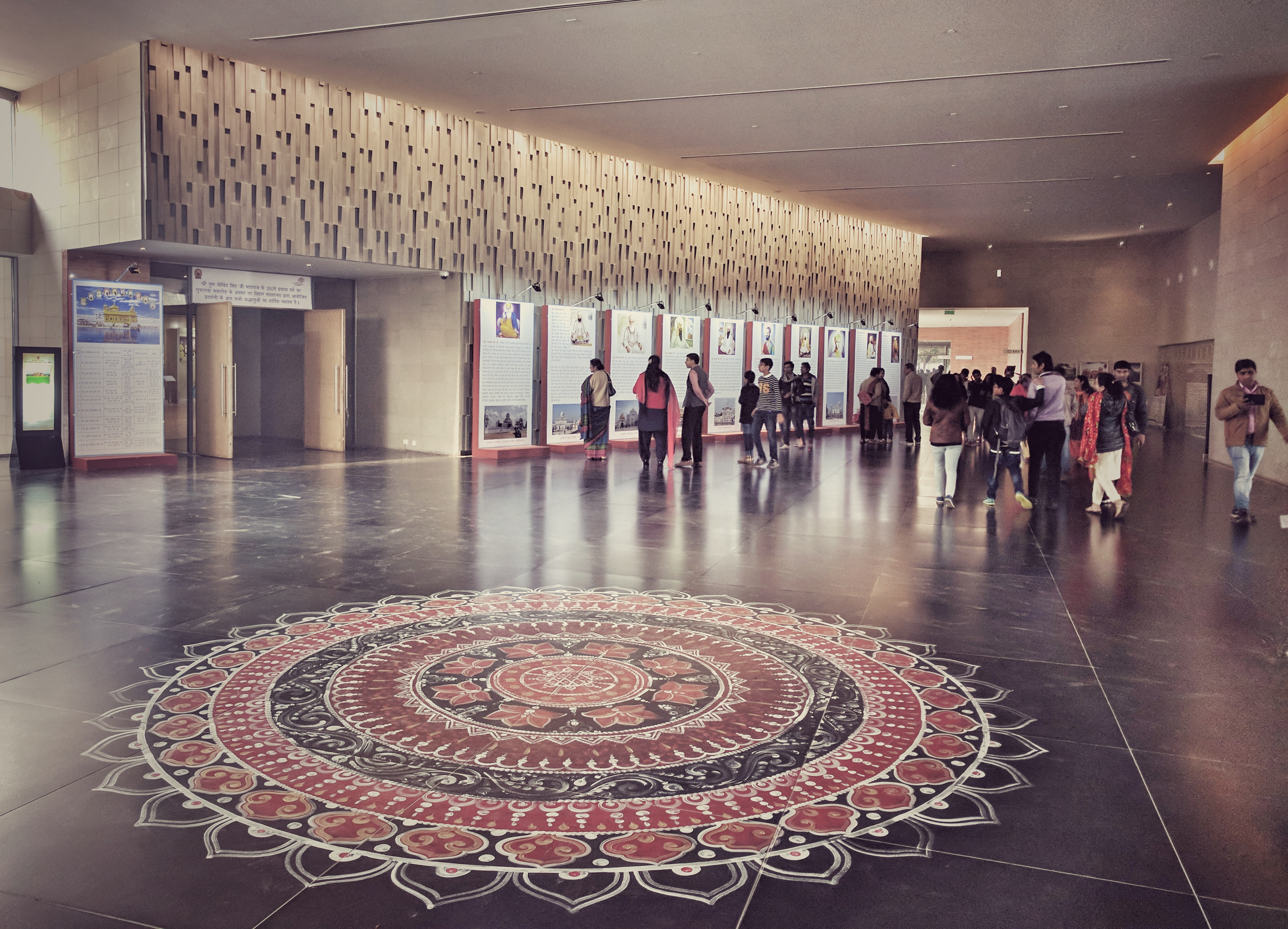

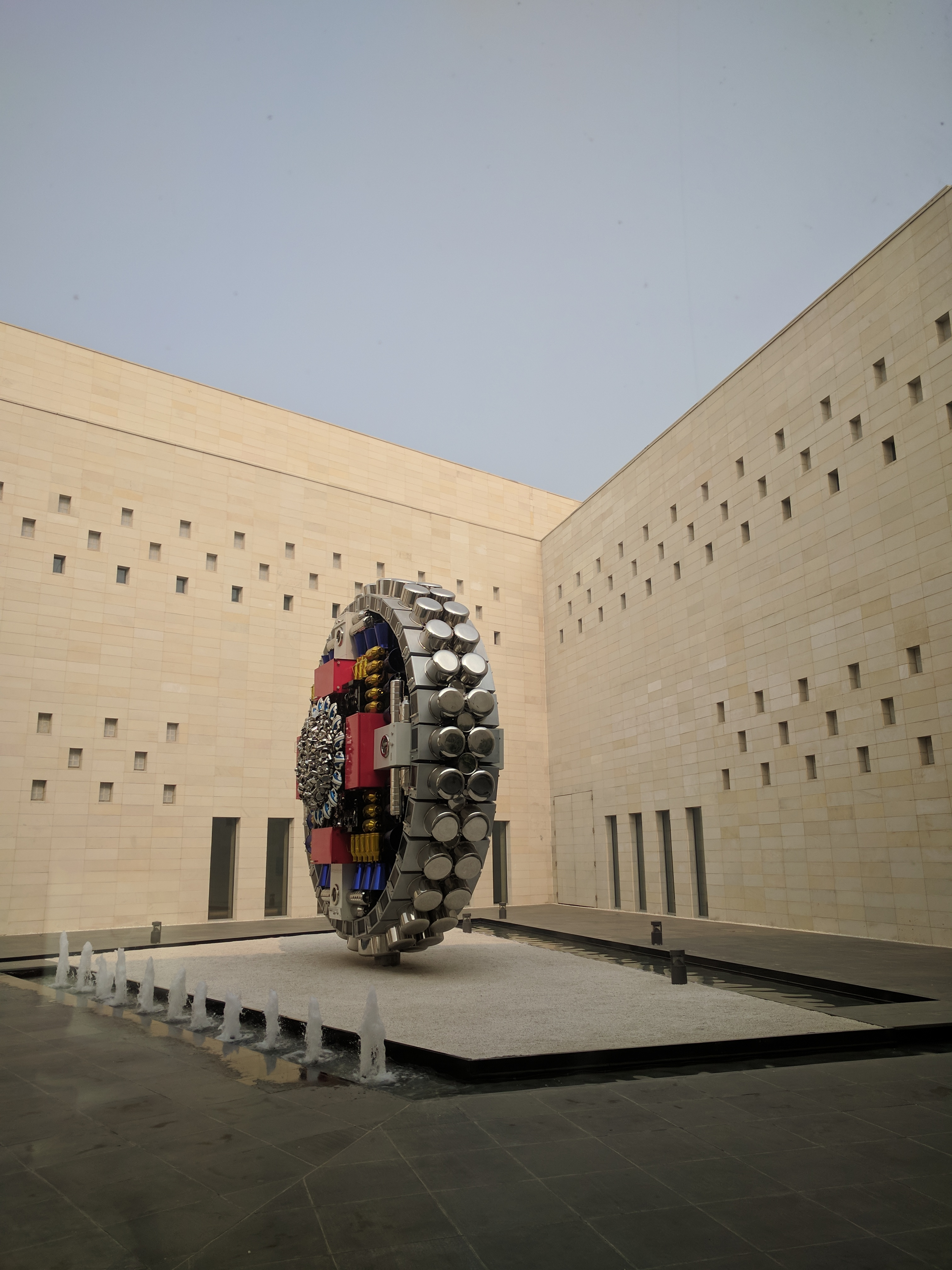

== See also ==
- Patna Museum
- Gandhi Sangrahalaya, Patna
- International Museum Day
- List of museums in Bihar
