= Bhagalpur Museum =

Museum in Bhagalpur

- Established: 1990
- Location: Bhagalpur; Bihar, India
- Coordinates: 25°15′4.54″N 86°59′18.21″E

Bhagalpur Museum is a museum in Bhagalpur district of Indian state of Bihar. The museum was established in 1976. The Museum's collections include coins, goddess idols and manuscripts from the Maurya to Mughal period. The museum is administered by the Cultural department of the Government of Bihar.

== History ==
The museum was established on 11 November 1976. Its collections have been updated since then. During a visit by Bihar Chief Minister Nitish Kumar in 2023, it was decided to expand Museum's collections.

== Collections ==
Most of museum collections are from 2nd to 7th-century.

- Idols: Idol collections include Lord Ganesha idols and 7th century Goddess Durga idols. There are also idols like Yakshini found from SSM School and Black stone carvings from Buddhist period.
- Paintings: Museum has a big collection of Madhubani style paintings from Medieval period of Indian history.

Museum also has a collection of preserved manuscripts.
