= List of learned societies =

This is a partial list of learned societies, grouped by country.

== International ==
- Accounting and Finance Association of Australia and New Zealand
- Association for Computing Machinery
- Association for Information Science and Technology
- Association for Symbolic Logic
- Association Internationale pour les Technologies Objets
- Association of Internet Researchers
- Australasian Law Teachers Association
- Australasian Proteomics Society
- Australasian Society for Experimental Psychology
- Australian and New Zealand Law and History Society
- Australian and New Zealand Society of Biomechanics
- Chinese Music Society of North America
- Comité International d'Histoire de l'Art
- Commission on Isotopic Abundances and Atomic Weights
- Design Research Society
- Digital Games Research Association
- Human Behavior and Evolution Society
- Illuminating Engineering Society
- Inter-American Congress of Philosophy
- International Academy of Quantum Molecular Science
- International AIDS Society
- International Association for Cross-Cultural Psychology
- International Association for Dental, Oral, and Craniofacial Research
- International Association for Engineering and Food
- International Association for Media and History
- International Association for Pattern Recognition
- International Association for Philosophy and Literature
- International Association for Relationship Research
- International Association for Research in Economic Psychology
- International Association for the Philosophy of Law and Social Philosophy
- International Association for the Semiotics of Law
- International Association for the Study of Dreams
- International Association for the Study of Pain
- International Association for Visual Semiotics
- International Association of Agricultural Economists
- International Association of Amateur Heralds
- International Association of Genocide Scholars
- International Association of Labour Law Journals
- International Association of Medical Colleges
- International Association of Scientific Experts in Tourism
- International Association of South-East European Studies
- International Behavioural and Neural Genetics Society
- International Berkeley Society
- International Board Game Studies Association
- International Cannabinoid Research Society
- International Commission of Agricultural and Biosystems Engineering
- The International Committee for the Conservation of the Industrial Heritage
- International Committee for the History of Technology
- International Communication Association
- International Council for Canadian Studies
- International Council for Philosophy and Human Sciences
- International Council for Science
- International Council of Onomastic Sciences
- International Council on Monuments and Sites
- Internationales Sachsensymposion
- International Federation for Research in Women's History
- International Federation of Philosophical Societies
- International Fiscal Association
- International Geographical Union
- International Geosynthetics Society
- International Glaciological Society
- International Institute for Conservation of Historic and Artistic Works
- International Institute of Philosophy
- International Mammalian Genome Society
- International Mathematical Union
- The International Molinological Society
- International N. D. Kondratiev Foundation
- International Network of Genocide Scholars
- International Neuropsychological Society
- International Phonetic Association
- International Playing-Card Society
- International Science Council
- International Society for Human Ethology
- International Society for Justice Research
- International Society for Neoplatonic Studies
- International Society for Neurochemistry
- International Society for Plant Pathology
- International Society for Research in Child and Adolescent Psychopathology
- International Society for Research on Aggression
- International Society for Science and Religion
- International Society for Structural and Multidisciplinary Optimization
- International Society for the Empirical Study of Literature
- International Society for the History of Philosophy of Science
- International Society for the Sociology of Religion
- International Society for the Study of Personality Disorders
- International Society for the Study of Time
- International Society for Universal Dialogue
- International Society of Biomechanics
- International Society of Criminology
- International Society of Critical Health Psychology
- International Society of Exposure Science
- International Society of Hymenopterists
- International Society of Political Psychology
- International Society of Technology in Arthroplasty
- International Society on General Relativity and Gravitation
- International Sociological Association
- International Statistical Institute
- International Union of Academies
- International Union of Crystallography
- International Union of Microbiological Societies
- International Union of Prehistoric and Protohistoric Sciences
- International Union of Pure and Applied Chemistry
- International Union of Pure and Applied Physics
- International Women in Biomechanics
- Kurt Gödel Society
- Latin American Studies Association
- Society for Animation Studies
- Society for Cultural Interaction in East Asia
- Society for Disability Studies
- Society for Ethnomusicology
- Society for Medieval Feminist Scholarship
- Society for Philosophy and Technology
- Society for Public Health Education
- Society for Research on Nicotine and Tobacco
- Society for Research Synthesis Methodology
- Society for Social Studies of Science
- Society for the Study of Human Development
- Society for the Study of Reproduction
- The Society of Legal Scholars
- Sociologists Without Borders
- Systemic Design Association
- Union Académique Internationale
- World Congress of Philosophy
- World Council for Comparative Education Societies
- World Economics Association
- World Federation of Neurosurgical Societies
- World Veterinary Association

== European ==
- European Academy of Sciences and Arts
- European Association for Artificial Intelligence
- European Association for Theoretical Computer Science
- European Association for the Study of Science and Technology
- European Brain and Behaviour Society
- European Crystallographic Association
- Engineers Europe
- European Geosciences Union
- European Mathematical Society
- European Physical Society
- European Society for Fuzzy Logic and Technology
- European Society for the Cognitive Sciences of Music
- Informatics Europe

== Argentina ==
- Academia Argentina de Letras
- Argentine Association of Translators and Interpreters
- Argentine Film Critics Association
- Argentine Forensic Anthropology Team
- Argentine Medical Association
- Belgranian National Institute
- Buenos Aires National Academy of Medicine
- Fundación Favaloro
- Fundación Italia
- Konex Foundation
- National Academy of History of Argentina
- San Martín National Institute
- Sociedad Argentina de Autores y Compositores de Música
- Association internationale d'études occitanes

== Armenia ==
- Armenian National Academy of Sciences
- Armenian Economic Association

== Austria ==
- Austrian Academy of Sciences
- Austrian Institute of Technology
- Austrian Research Institute for Artificial Intelligence
- Erwin Schrödinger International Institute for Mathematics and Physics
- Gregor Mendel Institute
- Institute Vienna Circle / Vienna Circle Society
- Joanneum Research
- Ludwig Boltzmann Institut für Menschenrechte

== Bangladesh ==
- Asiatic Society of Bangladesh
- Bangla Academy
- Bangladesh Academy for Rural Development
- Bangladesh Astronomical Association
- Bangladesh Computer Council
- Bangladesh Computer Samity
- Bangladesh Research and Education Network
- Bangladesh Entomological Society
- Bangladesh National Geographical Association
- Bangladesh Society of Microbiologists
- Bishwo Shahitto Kendro
- Bangladesh Shilpakala Academy
- Bangladesh Shishu Academy

== Belgium ==
- Belgian Physical Society
- Royal Flemish Academy of Belgium for Science and the Arts
- Royal Academy of Archaeology of Belgium

== Brazil ==
- Academia Nacional de Medicina
- Academia Brasileira de Letras
- Brazilian Academy of Sciences
- Brazilian Society of Physiology
- Brazilian Society of Health Informatics
- Brazilian Medical Association
- Sociedade Brasileira para o Progresso da Ciência

== Canada ==
- Association francophone pour le savoir
- Canadian Institute of Actuaries
- Canadian Economics Association
- Canadian Federation for the Humanities and Social Sciences
- Canadian Historical Association
- Canadian Information Processing Society
- Canadian Mathematical Society
- Canadian Political Science Association
- Canadian Society of Forensic Science
- Canadian Society of Medievalists
- Canadian Society for the Study of Religion
- Chemical Institute of Canada
- Engineering Institute of Canada
- Literary and Historical Society of Quebec
- Royal Astronomical Society of Canada
- Royal Canadian Geographical Society
- Royal Society of Canada
- Statistical Society of Canada

== China ==
- Chinese Academy of Engineering
- Chinese Academy of Sciences
- Chinese Academy of Social Sciences
- Chinese Chemical Society (Beijing)
- Chinese Mathematical Society
- Chinese Physical Society
- Royal Asiatic Society China

=== Hong Kong ===
- Royal Asiatic Society Hong Kong Branch

== Czech Republic ==
- Royal Bohemian Society of Sciences
- Societas eruditorum incognitorum in terris Austriacis
- Union of Czech mathematicians and physicists
- Learned Society of the Czech Republic

== Finland ==
- Actuarial Society of Finland
- Finnish Academy of Science and Letters
- Finnish Literature Society
- Finnish Society of Sciences and Letters
- Finno-Ugrian Society
- SAFA (architecture)

== France ==
The 5 académies of the Institut de France:

- Académie des Beaux-Arts
- Académie des Inscriptions et Belles-Lettres
- Académie des Sciences Morales et Politiques
- French Academy of Sciences
- Académie Française

=== Others ===
- Académie de Marine
- French Academy of Technologies
- Société mathématique de France
- Société de Mathématiques Appliquées et Industrielles

== Germany ==
- Verein Deutscher Ingenieure
- Bavarian Academy of Sciences and Humanities
- Berlin-Brandenburg Academy of Sciences and Humanities
- acatech
- German Academy of Sciences at Berlin
- German National Academy of Sciences Leopoldina
- Gesellschaft für deutsche Sprache
- Göttingen Academy of Sciences and Humanities
- Prussian Academy of Sciences
- Saxon Academy of Sciences and Humanities
- German Physical Society
- German Chemical Society
- German Crystallographic Society

== Ghana ==
- Ghana Academy of Arts and Sciences
- Ghana Academy of Film and Television Arts
- Ghana Biomedical Convention
- Ghana Institute of Architects
- Ghana Institution of Engineers
- Ghana Institute of Linguistics, Literacy and Bible Translation
- Ghana Institution of Surveyors
- Ghana Journalists Association
- Ghana Medical Association
- Historical Society of Ghana
- Nurses and Midwifery Council

== Hungary ==
- Hungarian Academy of Sciences
- Hungarian Historical Society

== India ==
- The Asiatic Society
- The Asiatic Society of Mumbai
- Indian National Science Academy
- Indian Academy of Sciences
- National Academy of Sciences, India
- Indian Science Congress Association
- Medical and Physical Society of Calcutta
- Indian Medical Association
- Medical Council of India
- Christian Medical Association of India
- National Integrated Medical Association
- Neurological Society of India
- Phycological Society of India
- All India Ophthalmological Society
- Indian Orthopaedic Association
- Federation of Obstetric and Gynaecological Societies of India
- Indian Association of Clinical Psychology
- Indian Academy of Forensic Medicine
- Indian Academy of Pediatrics
- Indian Association of Pathologists and Microbiologists
- Indian Mathematical Society
- Calcutta Mathematical Society
- Calcutta Statistical Association
- Indian Physical Society
- Indian Chemical Society
- Indian Botanical Society
- Indian Meteorological Society
- Indian Institute of Metals
- National Academy of Agricultural Sciences
- Indian National Academy of Engineering
- Institution of Engineers (India)
- Indian Institute of Architects
- Astronomical Society of India
- Computer Society of India
- National Geographical Society of India
- Indian Archaeological Society
- Indian History and Culture Society
- Indian Society for Ecological Economics
- Indian Anthropological Society
- Indian Sociological Society
- Calcutta Historical Society
- Madras Literary Society
- Bar Council of India
- The Institute of Chartered Accountants of India
- Institute of Company Secretaries of India
- Sahitya Akademi
- Sangeet Natak Akademi
- Lalit Kala Akademi

== Japan ==
- Asiatic Society of Japan
- Chemical Society of Japan
- Japan Society of Applied Physics
- Nihon Ishi Gakkai
- Nihon Yakushi Gakkai
- Optical Society of Japan
- Physical Society of Japan
- Yōgakushi Gakkai
- Society of Polymer Science

== Latvia ==
- Latvian Literary Society

== Malaysia ==
- Malaysian Branch of the Royal Asiatic Society

== Monaco ==
- Les Rencontres Philosophiques de Monaco

== Montenegro ==
- Montenegrin Sports Academy

== Netherlands ==
- Society for the Advancement of Science, Medicine and Surgery

== Norway ==
- Norwegian Academy of Science and Letters
- Royal Norwegian Society of Sciences and Letters
- Norwegian Academy of Technological Sciences

== New Zealand ==
- Legal Research Foundation
- Institute of IT Professionals
- New Zealand Dermatological Society
- Royal Numismatic Society of New Zealand
- Royal Society Te Apārangi
- The Heraldry Society of New Zealand
- New Zealand Institute of Chemistry

== Nigeria ==
- Association of Cost and Management Accountants
- Association of National Accountants of Nigeria
- Institute of Chartered Chemists of Nigeria
- Nigerian Academy of Engineering
- Nigerian Association of Law Teachers
- Nigerian Association of Mathematical Physics
- Nigerian Institute of Architects
- Nigerian Institute of International Affairs
- Nigerian Institute of Management
- Nigerian Institute of Quantity Surveyors
- Nigerian Society of Chemical Engineers
- Nigerian Society of Engineers
- Pharmaceutical Society of Nigeria

== Pakistan ==
- Pakistan Academy of Letters

== Papua New Guinea ==
- The Institute of Chemists PNG

== Poland ==
- Collegium Invisibile
- Polish Copernicus Society of Naturalists

== Portugal ==
- Lisbon Academy of Sciences
- Lisbon Geographic Society
- National Society of Fine Arts
- Portuguese Mathematical Society

== Serbia ==
- Serbian Academy of Sciences and Arts
- Matica srpska

== South Africa ==
- Astronomical Society of Southern Africa
- Economic Society of South Africa
- Royal Society of South Africa
- South African Archaeological Society

== South Korea ==
- Royal Asiatic Society Korea Branch
- Korean Language Society
- Korean Chemical Society
- Korean Mathematical Society
- Korean Physical Society

== Spain ==
Royal Academies of the Institute of Spain:

- Royal Spanish Academy
- Royal Academy of History
- Real Academia de Bellas Artes de San Fernando
- Spanish Royal Academy of Sciences
- Royal Academy of Jurisprudence and Legislation
- Royal National Academy of Medicine
- Royal Academy of Pharmacy
- Real Academia de Ciencias Morales y Políticas
- Royal Academy of Engineering (Spain)
- Royal Academy of Economic and Financial Sciences

== Sri Lanka ==
- National Academy of Sciences of Sri Lanka
- Computer Society of Sri Lanka
- College of Community Physicians of Sri Lanka
- Institute of Chartered Accountants of Sri Lanka
- Institution of Engineers, Sri Lanka
- Royal Asiatic Society of Sri Lanka

== Sweden ==
- Royal Gustavus Adolphus Academy
- Royal Swedish Academy of Agriculture and Forestry
- Royal Swedish Academy of Engineering Sciences
- Royal Swedish Academy of Fine Arts
- Royal Swedish Academy of Letters, History and Antiquities
- Royal Swedish Academy of Music
- Royal Swedish Academy of Sciences
- Royal Swedish Academy of War Sciences
- Royal Swedish Society of Naval Sciences
- Swedish Academy

== Switzerland ==
- Society for Art History in Switzerland

== Taiwan ==
- Academia Sinica
- Taiwanese Dermatological Association

== Thailand ==
- Siam Society

== Tunisia ==
- Beit al-Hikma Foundation

== Türkiye ==
- Turkish Academy of Sciences

== See also ==
- List of engineering societies
- List of international professional associations
