= Ninan =

Ninan is a given name among Saint Thomas Christians or Syrian Christians of Kerala, India. It is a Malayalam variant of Syriac name, Yohannan, equivalent to John in English.

It may also refer to:

== People ==
=== Surname ===
- Ajit Ninan (born 1955), Indian political cartoonist
- Delsy Ninan (fl. from 2005), Indian playback singer
- Juby Ninan (fl. from 2013), Indian actor
- Karachepone N. Ninan, (born 31 August 1950), an ecological economist.
- Kovoor Ninan Ninan, (born 6 September 1946), a space scientist from India
- Reena Ninan (born 1979), American television journalist
- Ryan Ninan (born 1985), Indian first-class cricketer
- Sathish Ninan (born 1968), Indian judge
- Sevanti Ninan (fl. from 1980), Indian journalist

=== Given name ===
- Ninan Koshy (1934–2015), Indian political thinker, foreign affairs expert, theologian and social analyst.

== Places ==
- Ninan, Haryana, a village in Haryana, India
