= Justin Cobb =

British surgeon and academic

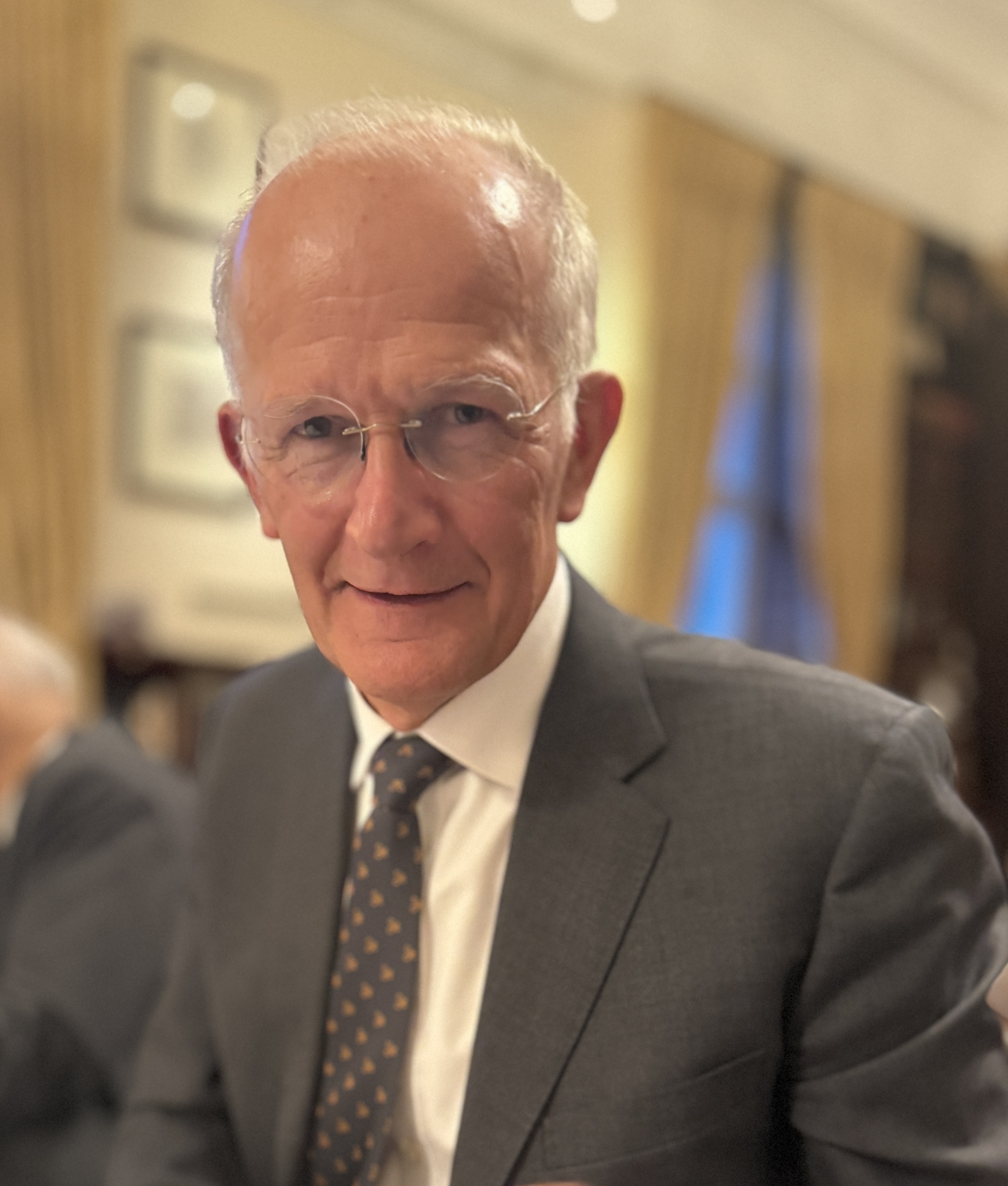
- Justin Cobb, Athaneum Club, London (2025)
- Education: Magdalen College, Oxford
- Occupation: Surgeon
- Known for: Robotic orthopaedic surgery; Royal orthopaedic surgeon to the King
- Medical career
- Profession: Surgeon
- Field: Orthopedics
- Institutions: The Middlesex; University College Hospital; Imperial College; King Edward VII's Hospital
- Sub-specialties: Robotic knee surgery
- Research: Haptic based robotics

Justin Peter Cobb CVO is a British professor of orthopaedic surgery at Imperial College London, known for introducing medical robotics into orthopaedic surgery. He is a member of the Royal Medical Household and is royal orthopaedic surgeon to the King. He is on the staff at King Edward VII's Hospital (KEVII) and is civilian advisor in orthopaedics to the Royal Air Force (RAF). His research has also included themes relating to designing new devices such as for ceramic hip resurfacing, 3D printing in orthopaedics, and training in surgical skills. He is a director of the MSk laboratory based in the Sir Michael Uren Hub.

Cobb was a demy at Magdalen College, Oxford, from where he graduated in 1982. He completed his early surgical training at St Thomas' Hospital, The Middlesex and the Royal National Orthopaedic Hospital (RNOH). In 1991 he was appointed consultant at The Middlesex and University College Hospital (UCH), and worked at the London Bone Tumour Unit, and in trauma and general orthopaedics. He is a recipient of the Hunterian Professorship, awarded for his work on surgery and osteosarcoma. Together with engineer Brian Davies from Imperial, he developed the world's first haptic based robotic assistant known as 'Acrobot', used to assist in knee surgery.

In 1999 he operated on the wounded following the London nail bombings, and he treated the injured following the 2005 attacks in London.

== Education and training ==
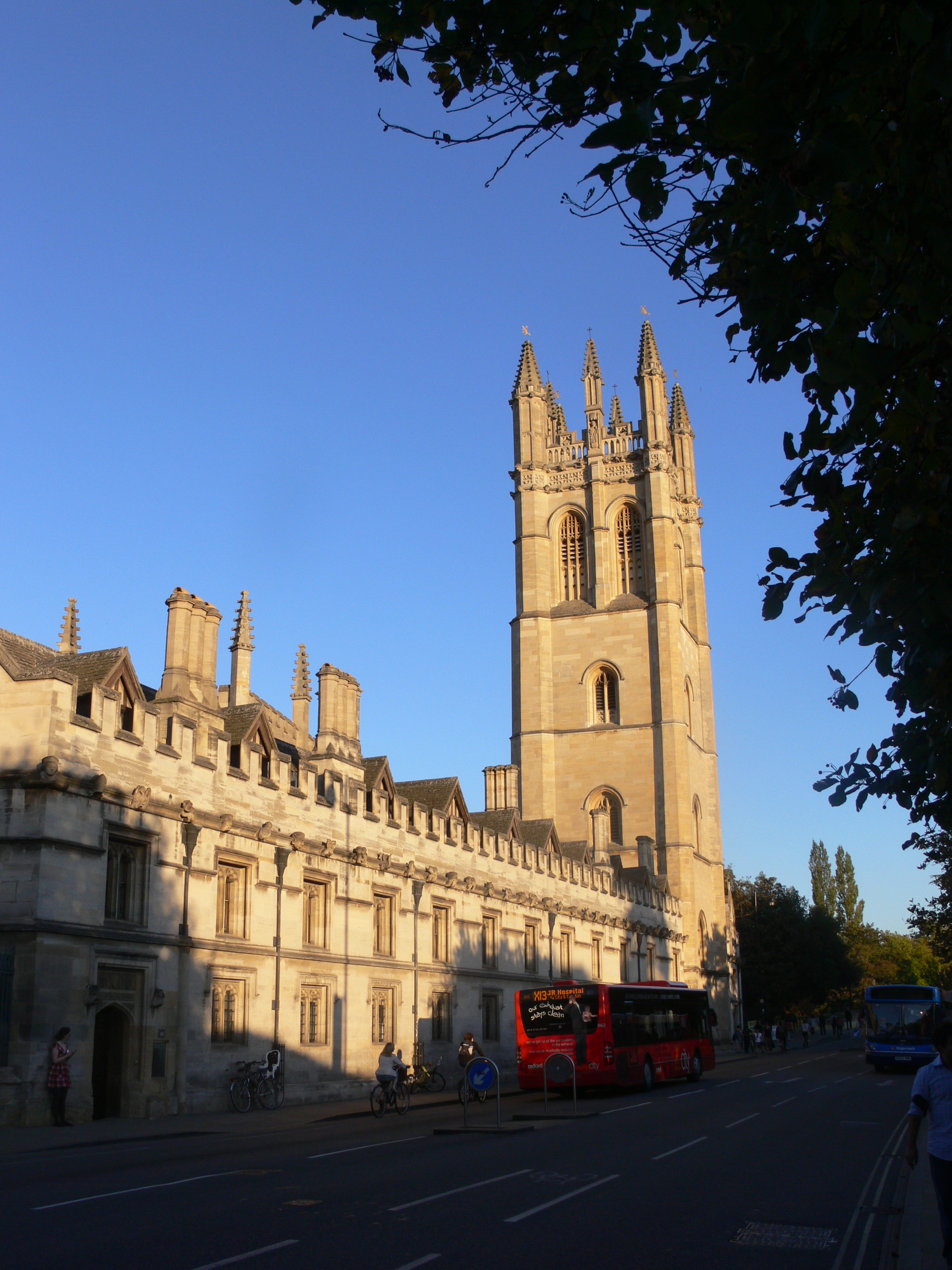
Magdalen College, where Cobb was a demy

Justin Cobb was a demy at Magdalen College, Oxford, from where he graduated in 1982. He moved to London as a senior house officer in 1984, and completed his junior surgical training before rotating through orthopaedic firms at St Thomas', The Middlesex and the RNOH, including working for Sir Rodney Sweetnam in 1985. At the RNOH, as orthopaedic registrar, his work with Gordon Blunn and Peter Walker in the Biomedical Engineering Unit, led to being awarded the Hunterian Professorship. (Note: The Hunterian Professorship is awarded annually by the Royal College of Surgeons to a young surgeon for original research in surgery.) He completed his master's in 1991 with a thesis titled "Prognostic factors in operable osteosarcoma".

== Surgical career ==
In 1991 Cobb was appointed consultant at The Middlesex and UCH, and worked at the London Bone Tumour Unit, and in trauma and general orthopaedics. In 1992, he delivered the Hunterian oration.

In 1992 he received his first grant from the special trustees of The Middlesex and UCH, for the purpose of research in robotics in orthopaedic surgery. Together with engineer Brian Davies from Imperial College, his work led to the development of 'Acrobot', the world's first haptic based robot for orthopaedics. In 1999 they co-founded the spinout 'Acrobot'. Cobb operated with the robot first in 2000. Acrobot was originally designed to be used in total knee replacement surgery with application for use in unicompartmental knee arthroplasty (UKA). It allowed the surgeon to stay in touch with the patient and control the cutting tool at the same time as moving the robotic arm. He subsequently reported a randomized, double-blinded study comparing the Acrobot with traditional knee surgery. It showed that the tactile-guided robot-assisted UKA was more precise than the traditional manually performed UKA. Where only 40% of traditionally operated knees were in the desired orientation, all of the robotic assisted knees were found to be within the desired two degrees offsimon orientation. Acrobot was acquired by Stanmore Implants in 2010. When the FDA approved Acrobot for clinical use in the USA, Mako surgical acquired the company, prior to Stryker acquiring Mako. His research has also included themes relating to designing new devices such as for ceramic hip resurfacing, 3D printing to allow a minimally invasive joint preservation surgery, training in surgical skills, and looking at the impact of exercise, disability and drugs on bone health and material properties.

In 1999, along with plastic surgeon Gus McGrouther, he treated the wounded following the London nail bombings. He was appointed chair of orthopaedics at Imperial College London in 2005. That year he had also treated the wounded of the 2005 London bombings. As member of the Royal Medical Household, he was appointed royal orthopaedic surgeon to the Queen in 2008, and later to the King He is on the staff at King Edward VII's Hospital, and within the Royal Air Force, he is a civilian advisor.

=== MSk laboratory ===
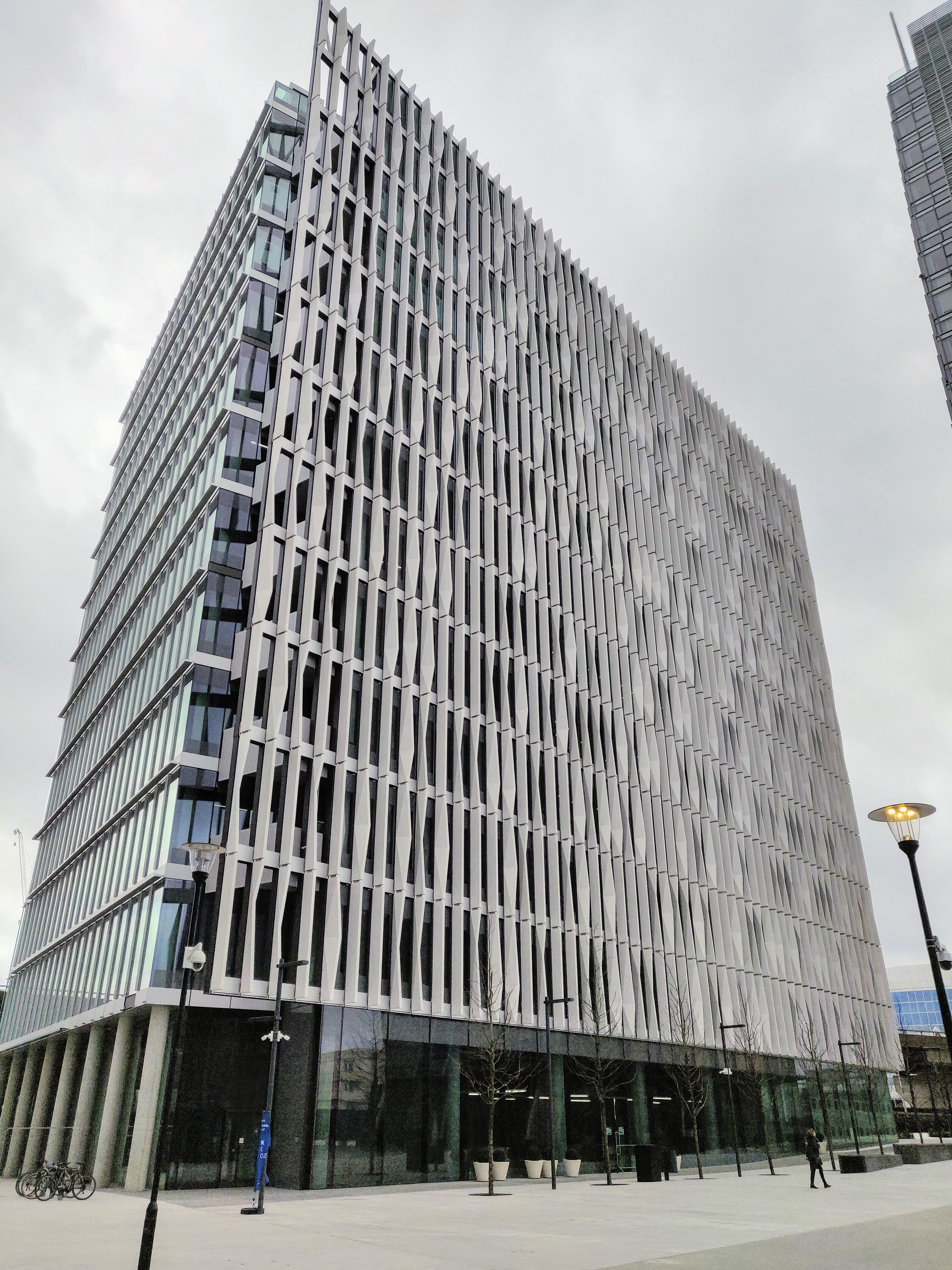
Sir Michael Uren Building, houses the MSk laboratory

Cobb is credited for developing the MSk laboratory at Imperial's Charing Cross campus, later based in the Sir Michael Uren Hub. Sir Michael Uren pledged £40m towards a building designed as a hub for scientists, engineers, clinicians and patients. It was opened in December 2020 with Cobb and Alison McGregor as the MSk Lab's directors.

== Honours ==
Cobb was appointed Commander of the Royal Victorian Order (CVO) in the 2023 New Year Honours for his services as orthopaedic surgeon to the King.

== Personal and family ==
In 1985, he married Iona, a general practitioner, and they have four children.

== Selected publications ==
=== Books ===
- Modern trends in THA bearings material and clinical performance. Berlin: Springer. 2010. ISBN 978-3-642-13988-8. OCLC 663475989.
- Bioceramics and alternative bearings in joint arthroplasty. London: Springer. 2010. ISBN 978-3-7985-1921-3. OCLC 640085842.

=== Articles ===
- Jakopec, M.; Harris, S. J.; Rodriguez y Baena, F.; Gomes, P.; Cobb, J.; Davies, B. L. (1 January 2001). "The First Clinical Application of a "Hands-On" Robotic Knee Surgery System". Computer Aided Surgery. 6 (6): 329–339. doi:10.3109/10929080109146302. ISSN 1092-9088. PMID 11954064. S2CID 219186608.
- Cobb, J.; Henckel, J.; Gomes, P.; Harris, S.; Jakopec, M.; Rodriguez, F.; Barrett, A.; Davies, B. (February 2006). "Hands-on robotic unicompartmental knee replacement: a prospective, randomised controlled study of the acrobot system". The Journal of Bone and Joint Surgery. British Volume. 88 (2): 188–197. doi:10.1302/0301-620X.88B2.17220. ISSN 0301-620X. PMID 16434522.
- Willis-Owen, CA; Brust, K; Alsop, H; Miraldo, M; Cobb, JP (December 2009). "Unicondylar knee arthroplasty in the UK National Health Service: an analysis of candidacy, outcome and cost efficacy". The Knee. 16 (6): 473–8. doi:10.1016/j.knee.2009.04.006. PMID 19464898.
- Hart, Alister J.; Satchithananda, Keshthra; Liddle, Alexander D.; Sabah, Shiraz A.; McRobbie, Donald; Henckel, Johann; Cobb, Justin P.; Skinner, John A.; Mitchell, Adam W. (15 February 2012). "Pseudotumors in Association with Well-Functioning Metal-on-Metal Hip Prostheses: A Case-Control Study Using Three-Dimensional Computed Tomography and Magnetic Resonance Imaging". Journal of Bone and Joint Surgery. 94 (4): 317–325. doi:10.2106/JBJS.J.01508. PMID 22336970.
- Rivière, C.; Lazennec, J.-Y.; Van Der Straeten, C.; Auvinet, E.; Cobb, J.; Muirhead-Allwood, S. (June 2017). "The influence of spine-hip relations on total hip replacement: A systematic review". Orthopaedics & Traumatology, Surgery & Research. 103 (4): 559–568. doi:10.1016/j.otsr.2017.02.014. hdl:10044/1/49571. ISSN 1877-0568. PMID 28373138.

== See also ==
- List of honorary medical staff at King Edward VII's Hospital for Officers
