= International Association =

International Association may refer to:

- International Association
- International Association for Cereal Science and Technology
- International Association for Computing and Philosophy
- International Association for Cryptologic Research
- International Association for Cultural Freedom
- International Association for Energy Economics
- International Association for Food Protection
- International Association for Identification
- International Association for Plant Taxonomy
- International Association for Professional Base Ball Players
- International Association for Promotion of Christian Higher Education
- International Association for Technology Trade
- International Association for the Advancement of Ethnology and Eugenics
- International Association for the Evaluation of Educational Achievement
- International Association for the Protection of Industrial Property
- International Association for the Study of Pain
- International Association of Academies
- International Association of Administrative Professionals
- International Association of Amateur Heralds
- International Association of Analytical Psychologists
- International Association of Antarctic Tour Operators
- International Association of Arson Investigators
- International Association of Art Critics
- International Association of Astronomical Artists
- International Association of Athletics Federations
- International Association of Bloodstain Pattern Analysts
- International Association of Bridge, Structural, Ornamental and Reinforcing Iron Workers
- International Association of Chiefs of Police
- International Association of Classification Societies
- International Association of Consulting Actuaries
- International Association of Crime Analysts
- International Association of Dental Students
- International Association of Educators
- International Association of Emergency Managers
- International Association of Exorcists
- International Association of Financial Engineers
- International Association of Fire Fighters
- International Association of Gay Square Dance Clubs
- International Association of Genocide Scholars
- International Association of Heat and Frost Insulators and Asbestos Workers
- International Association of Hydraulic Engineering and Research
- International Association of Law Enforcement Intelligence Analysts
- International Association of Lighthouse Authorities
- International Association of Lions Clubs
- International Association of Machinists
- International Association of Machinists and Aerospace Workers
- International Association of Nitrox and Technical Divers
- International Association of Privacy Professionals
- International Association of Professional Numismatists
- International Association of Prosecutors
- International Association of Scientologists
- International Association of Teachers of English as a Foreign Language
- International Association of Travel Agents Network
- International Association of Ultrarunners
- International Association of Universities
- International Workingmen's Association
