= Affectio societatis =

Affectio societatis is the common will of two or more natural or legal persons to form a legal entity. It is a key characteristic of a company under French law. Articles 1832 and 1833 of the French Civil Code form the basis of this principle, although since there is no statutory definition, it has also been shaped by jurisprudence.
