= Miguel Reale =

Brazilian academic and philosopher (1910–2006)

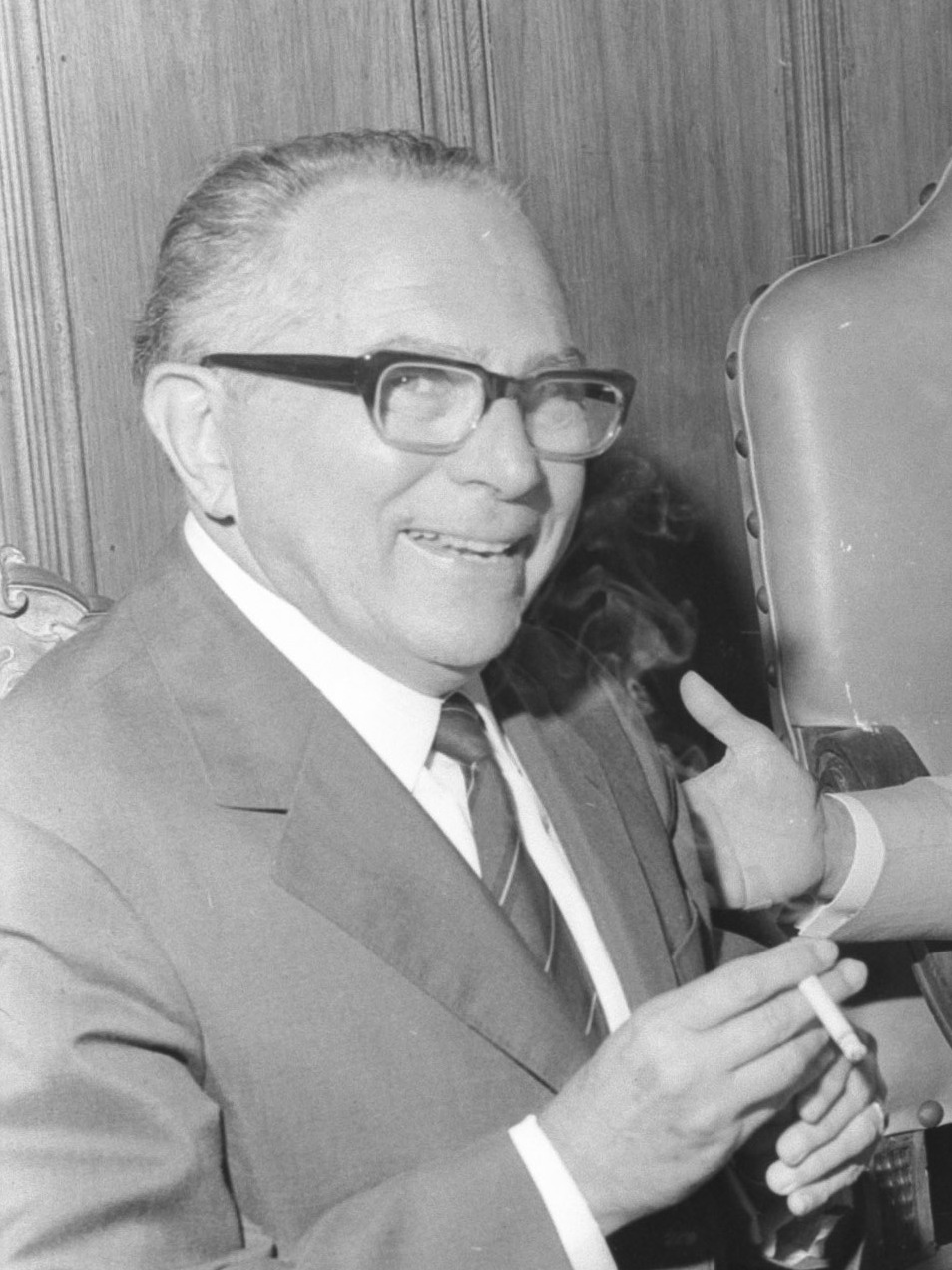
- Born: 6 November 1910; São Bento do Sapucaí, São Paulo (state), Brazil
- Died: 14 April 2006 (aged 95); São Paulo, São Paulo (state), Brazil
- Occupations: Lawyer, professor, writer

Academic background
- Education: Law School, University of São Paulo
- Influences: Husserl, Croce, Kant, Hegel, Torres, Labriola, del Vecchio, Barreto, Rocco, Spengler

Academic work
- Main interests: Philosophy, law, politics, poetry, education
- Notable works: Filosofia do Direito (1950)
- Notable ideas: Three-dimensional theory of law

Miguel Reale (6 November 1910 – 14 April 2006) was a Brazilian jurist, philosopher, academic, politician and poet, known as one of the most important Brazilian jurists and as an exponent of the three-dimensional theory of law. He was one of the leaders of Integralism in Brazil and an ideologue of the Brazilian Integralist Action.

Reale served as Secretary of Justice for the state of São Paulo in 1947. He founded the Brazilian Institute of Philosophy in 1949 and the São Paulo-based Inter-American Society of Philosophy in 1954. He was a member of the Brazilian Academy of Letters.

== Biography ==
Reale graduated from the Law Faculty of the University of São Paulo (1934), where he was professor (1941) and rector (1949-1950, 1969-1973). In addition, he received the title of professor emeritus of the University of São Paulo.

As a scholar, he became well known in Latin America and in Continental Europe for his works on law and philosophy.

Was a prolific writer in the legal field, having written several classic works of Brazilian philosophical and legal thought. Among his works: Philosophy of Law and Preliminary Lessons of Law.

Received notoriety when formulating the three-dimensional theory of law on which the law has three dimensions: social fact, value and legal norm. Briefly, his theory can be understood as follows: "The social fact (sociological aspect) is valued (axiological aspect) and, due to this, it produces a legal standard." Thus, the three dimensions of law come into connection through a peculiar cultural dialectic called "dialectic of polarity and implication."

In 1969 he was appointed by President Arthur da Costa e Silva for "High Level Commission" set up to review the 1967 Constitution. Resulted this work part of the text of Constitutional Amendment No. 1, dated 17 October 1969, which consolidated the military regime in Brazil.

In 2002 Reale, Ada Pellegrini Grinover, Maria Helena Diniz and Gofredo da Silva Teles Júnior actively participated in the important drafting of the Brazilian Civil Code. The project was sanctioned by President Fernando Henrique Cardoso, becoming the Law 10.406/2002. He is considered the chief architect of Brazil's current Civil Code.

Miguel Reale had prominent role in the field of philosophy, occupying the following positions: Co-founder of the Brazilian Institute of Philosophy of Lisbon, Portugal. Organizing seven Brazilian Congresses of Philosophy (1950-2002) and the VIII Inter-American Congress of Philosophy (Brasilia, 1972). Special Rapporteur on the XII, XIII and XIV World Congress of Philosophy (Venice, 1958, and Mexico City, 1963, and Vienna, 1968). Lecturer specially invited by the International Federation of Philosophical Societies for the XVI and XVIII World Congress (Düsseldorf, Germany, 1978, and Brighton, UK, 1988). Organizer and president of the II Brazilian Congress of Legal and Social Philosophy (São Paulo, 1986) and the third and fourth Congresses (João Pessoa, Paraíba, 1988/1990).

Honorary titles
Preceded by Cândido Mota Filho	3rd Academic of the 2nd Chair of the São Paulo Academy of Letters; 5 October 1977–April 14, 2006	Succeeded by Miguel Reale Júnior
