= Indian Society for Ecological Economics =

Organization

- Abbreviation: INSEE
- Formation: 24 September 1998
- Type: NGO
- Headquarters: New Delhi
- Region served: India
- Members: 576
- Official language: English
- President: Nilanjan Ghosh India
- Affiliations: International Society for Ecological Economics (ISEE)
- Website: INSEE Official website

The Indian Society for Ecological Economics (INSEE) was founded in 1998 and registered as a Society under the Societies Registration Act in January 1999. Headquartered in New Delhi, this is a regional society affiliated to the International Society for Ecological Economics (ISEE). The society publishes a bi-annual, open access peer-reviewed journal Ecology, Economy and Society–The INSEE Journal, books and other materials, and holds periodic meetings and conferences to facilitate a voice for ecological economists.

The INSEE was initially presided over by Kanchan Chopra of the Institute of Economic Growth, and subsequently by C.H. Hanumantha Rao, Gopal K. Kadekodi, Narpat Singh Jodha, Jayanta Bandyopadhyay, Sudarshan Iyengar, Kanchan Chopra, Amita Shah, Sharachchandra Lele, Pranab Mukhopadhyay, K.N. Ninan, and Shreekant Gupta. The present President of INSEE is Nilanjan Ghosh.

== Areas of Work ==
The work of INSEE has broadly addressed issues of sustainable development, urbanization, climate change and disasters, global commons and environment. The INSEE journal and the biennial conferences have contributed significantly to the development and environment discourse in India. The conceptual approach of INSEE spans the disciplinary divide of the sub-fields of ecological economics and environmental economics and has "...remained both conceptually and methodologically open, and relatively free of this divide", from a position that does not "...typecast any specific definition of ecological economics". As noted by Ghosh and others (2016): "Ecological economics has been acknowledged by the Society to subsume the neoclassical framework of environmental economics, apart from considering the broader body of the literature emerging at the interface of economics, ecological sciences, hydrology, geology, geography, sociology, political science, anthropology etc."

== Ecology, Economy and Society–The INSEE Journal ==
Ecology, Economy and Society–The INSEE Journal
- Discipline: Ecological Economics
- Language: English
- Edited by: Kamal Bawa, Kanchan Chopra, Kuntala Lahiri-Dutt

Publication details
- History: 1998
- Publisher: Indian Society for Ecological Economics (India)
- Frequency: Biennial
- Open access: yes
- License: CC BY-NC 4.0

Standard abbreviations
- ISO 4: Ecol. Econ. Soc.–INSEE J.

Indexing
- ISSN: 2581-6152 (print); 2581-6101 (web)

Links
- Journal homepage

Ecology, Economy and Society–The INSEE Journal is a bi-annual journal published by the Indian Society for Ecological Economics. The first two issues appeared in 2018 and two issues have been published each year since then. The journal today publishes papers on ecological economics, sustainable development and multi-disciplinary subjects related to ecology, economy, and society. Besides regular academic and review papers, the journal also carries book reviews and commentaries on related topics.

== INSEE Conferences ==
INSEE holds biennial conferences in different locations:

- Tenth INSEE Biennial Conference, 2019, CESS, Hyderabad, INSEE-CESS International Conference, "Climate Change and Disasters: Challenges, Opportunities and Responses", 6–8 November 2019
- Ninth INSEE Biennial Conference, 2017, KILA, Thrissur, "Sustainability, Institutions, Incentives: Voices, Policies and Commitments", 8–10 November 2017
- Eighth INSEE Biennial Conference, 2016, Bengaluru, "Urbanization and the Environment", 4–6 January 2016
- Seventh INSEE Biennial Conference, 2013, Guwahati, "Global Change, Ecosystems, Sustainability", 5–8 December 2013
- Sixth INSEE Biennial Conference, 2011, Hyderabad, "Nature, Economy and Society: Understanding the Linkages", 20–22 October 2011
- Fifth INSEE Biennial Conference, 2009, Ahmedabad, "Environmental Governance", 20–21 January 2009
- Fourth INSEE Biennial Conference, 2005, Mumbai, "Ecology and Human Well Being", 3–4 June 2005
- Third INSEE Biennial Conference, 2003, Mumbai, "Biodiversity and Quality of Life", 18–20 December 2003
- Second INSEE Biennial Conference, 2001, Bhopal, "Water Resources, Sustainable Livelihood and Eco-system Services", 19–21 December 2001
- First INSEE Biennial Conference, 1999, Bangalore, "Ecological Economics For Sustainable Development", 20–22 December 1999
