= Brian Davies (engineer) =

British engineer

- Engineering career
- Discipline: Medical robotics
- Institutions: Imperial College London

Brian Davies is a British emeritus professor of medical robotics at Imperial College London. He developed Probot, the first robotic device to operate upon a human being. Later, he developed the haptic based robotic assistant known as 'Acrobot', the first haptic based robot to be used in orthopaedic surgery. He is a Fellow of the Royal Academy of Engineering.

== Career ==
Brian Davies began his career at Imperial College London in 1983. He completed his doctorate in medical robotics.

In 1987, working with urologist, John Wickham, Davies developed Probot, a robot for prostate surgery and in 1991 it was the first robotic device to operate upon a human being. By 1999, with orthopaedic surgeon Justin Cobb, he developed the robotic assistant known as 'Acrobot', the first haptic based robot to be used in orthopaedic surgery. In 1999 he co-founded the spinout ‘Acrobot’, which was later acquired by Stanmore Implants. In 2001 he was awarded a DSc.

He later developed the robot Sculptor, to assist surgeons in replacing knee joints.

== Awards ==
In 2015, for his work into robots, he was awarded the life-time achievement award by the International Society of Technology in Arthroplasty (ISTA).

== Selected publications ==
- Jakopec, M.; Harris, S. J.; Rodriguez y Baena, F.; Gomes, P.; Cobb, J.; Davies, B. L. (1 January 2001). "The First Clinical Application of a "Hands-On" Robotic Knee Surgery System". Computer Aided Surgery. 6 (6): 329–339. doi:10.3109/10929080109146302. ISSN 1092-9088. PMID 11954064. S2CID 219186608.
- Borelli, Joao; Bello, Fernando; Rodriguez Y Bena, Ferdinando; Davies, Brian (2004). "An active constraint environment for minimally invasive heart surgery: early experience of a cutting operation". Studies in Health Technology and Informatics. 98: 31–33. ISSN 0926-9630. PMID 15544236.
- Cobb, J.; Henckel, J.; Gomes, P.; Harris, S.; Jakopec, M.; Rodriguez, F.; Barrett, A.; Davies, B. (February 2006). "Hands-on robotic unicompartmental knee replacement: a prospective, randomised controlled study of the acrobot system". The Journal of Bone and Joint Surgery. British Volume. 88 (2): 188–197. doi:10.1302/0301-620X.88B2.17220. ISSN 0301-620X. PMID 16434522.
- Davies, Brian (1 December 2006). "Essay: Medical robotics—a bright future". The Lancet. 368: S53–S54. doi:10.1016/S0140-6736(06)69929-7. ISSN 0140-6736. S2CID 54388891.
