= Ada Pellegrini Grinover =

Brazilian lawyer (1933–2017)

- in 2013
- Born: 1933; Naples, Italy
- Died: 13 July 2017 (aged 84); São Paulo, Brazil
- Occupation: Lawyer

Ada Pellegrini Grinover (16 April 1933 – 13 July 2017) was a Brazilian lawyer. She was a full professor at the University of São Paulo and attorney for the state of São Paulo.

== Life ==
Grinover was born in 1933 in Naples. Her father, Domenico Pellegrini Giampietro, was an Italian minister in Mussolini's fascist government from 1943 to 1945. The family emigrated to Brazil in 1951. She studied law at the University of São Paulo, graduating in 1958, and achieving a doctorate in 1970. In 1973 she became a law professor and in 1980 a full professor.

In 2002 she was involved in setting up a long list of new laws for Brazil. Others involved were Miguel Reale, Maria Helena Diniz and Gofredo da Silva Teles Júnior, she actively participated in the important drafting of the Brazilian Civil Code.

In 2005, "Studies in Tribute to Professor Ada Pellegrini Grinover" was published by professors Flávio Luiz Yarshell and Maurício Zanoide de Moraes.

Grinover died in São Paulo on 13 July 2017.
