= Sir Michael Uren Hub =

Building in London, England

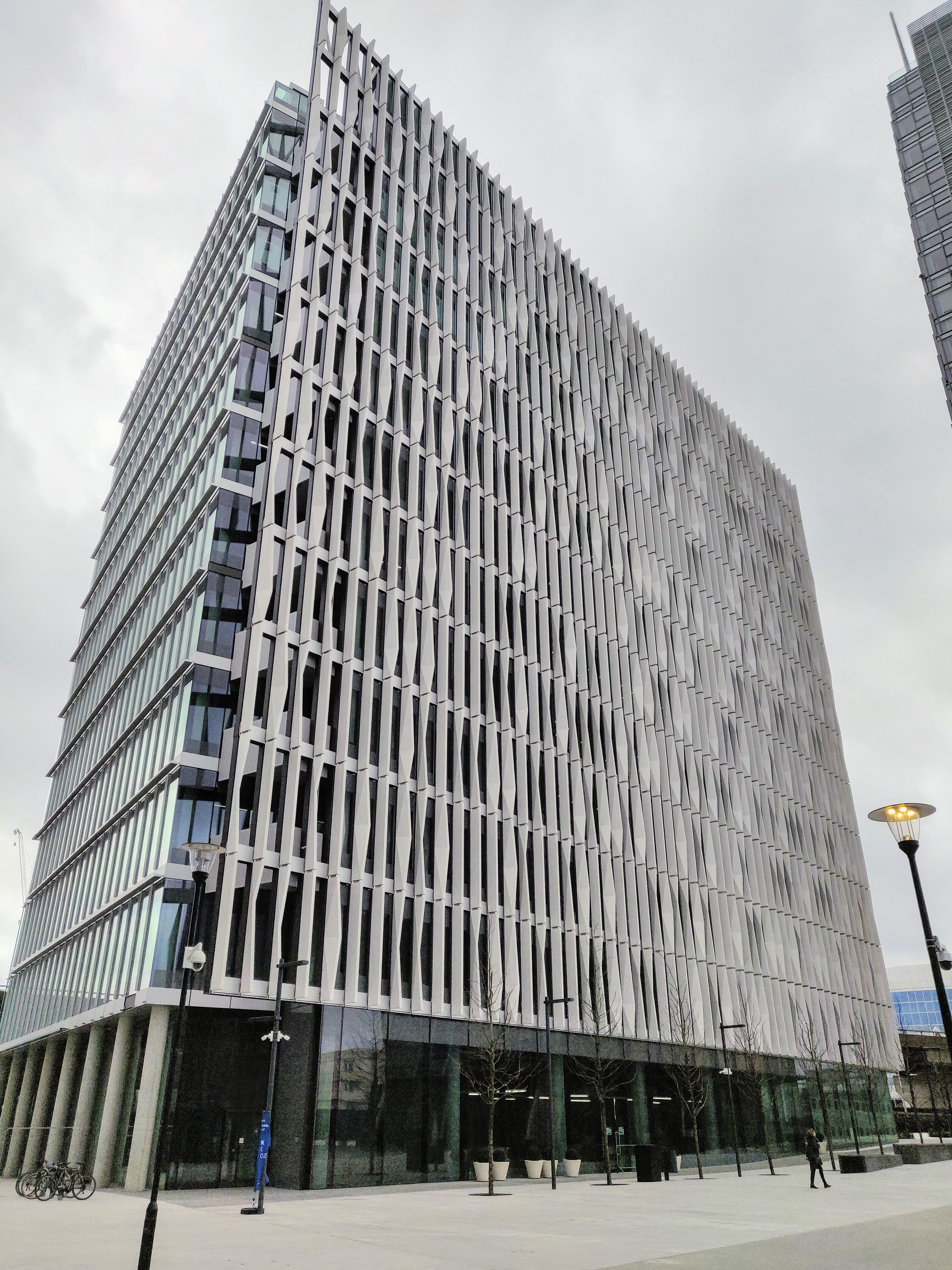
- Sir Michael Uren Building, White City, from north side
- Interactive map of the Sir Michael Uren Hub area

General information
- Location: Unit 14, The Westworks, Wood Lane, Shepherd's Bush, London W12 7ED, London, UK
- Coordinates: 51.5157°N 0.2250°W
- Construction started: January 2017
- Opened: December 2020
- Owner: Imperial College London

Technical details
- Floor count: 13
- Grounds: 25-acres

Design and construction
- Architecture firm: Allies and Morrison
- Main contractor: ISG

The Sir Michael Uren Hub is a 13-storey building on the north side of the elevated A40 Westway in London, designed by Allies and Morrison for the purpose of Imperial College's translational interdisciplinary and convergence science biomedical engineering research. It contains a 160-seat auditorium, social space, cleanrooms, and a whole host of unique experimental facilities. It is named for engineer Sir Michael Uren and built using his engineered cement substitute, ground granulated blast furnace slag (GGBS).

It houses the Musculoskeletal Lab (MSk lab), the Musculoskeletal Medical Engineering Centre, Neurorehabilition and Neuroscience translational research, Imperial's Environmental Research Group, Cardiovascular research, and the Dementia Research Institute Centres.

== Location ==
The Sir Michael Uren Hub is situated on Wood Lane, Shepherd's Bush, London. To its north is a 34-storey tower, to its east is an incubator building, and to its south is an elevated section of the A40 Westway.

== History ==
In 2014 Imperial College London announced that it was to build a biomedical engineering centre supported by a £40 million donation from Sir Micheal Uren and his foundation, at Imperial West, the College's 25-acre research and innovation campus in White City, west London. The purpose was to house Imperial's biomedical and healthcare researchers, engineers, scientists and clinicians, along with spin-out companies, in one building.

Work on the site began in January 2017. It officially opened in December 2020.

== Design ==
The 13-storey Hub was designed by architects Allies and Morrison, and the project was managed by Turner & Townsend, with mechanical and engineering consultants Buro Happold. Autodesk Revit provided the CAD software, and the building was inspected by Bureau Veritas. ISG Ltd was the contractor.

=== Structural features ===
The building has a triangular base and covers 18,150 square metres. It has two long sides, covered in 1,300 GGBS containing four metre high vertical precast concrete fins, of which there are nine types. GGBS, a waste by-product of coal-fired power stations, was developed by Uren's company as a substitute for cement which produces a fraction of the carbon emissions. The fins act to shade from the sun.

It contains a 160-seat auditorium, social space, cleanrooms, and a co-location space for research in medical technologies for patient benefit. It houses a large suite of core experimental facilities for use by the researchers and industrial partners, the Musculoskeletal Medical Engineering Centre, Neurorehabilitation and Neuroscience Research, two Dementia Research Institute Centres, the School of Public Health's Environmental Research Group led by Frank Kelly, the MSk Lab led by Justin Cobb and Alison McGregor, the Centre for Cardiovascular Bioengineering, and 20 companies. Members of the National Heart and Lung Institute (NHLI) occupy space on the ninth floor.

It has space for functions and exhibitions in the main entrance, adjacent to the ground floor licensed facility. The auditorium and its foyer on the lower ground floor can be accessed via the main entrance and the research floors above can be accessed via secure entry. There are toilets on all floors.

== Gallery ==
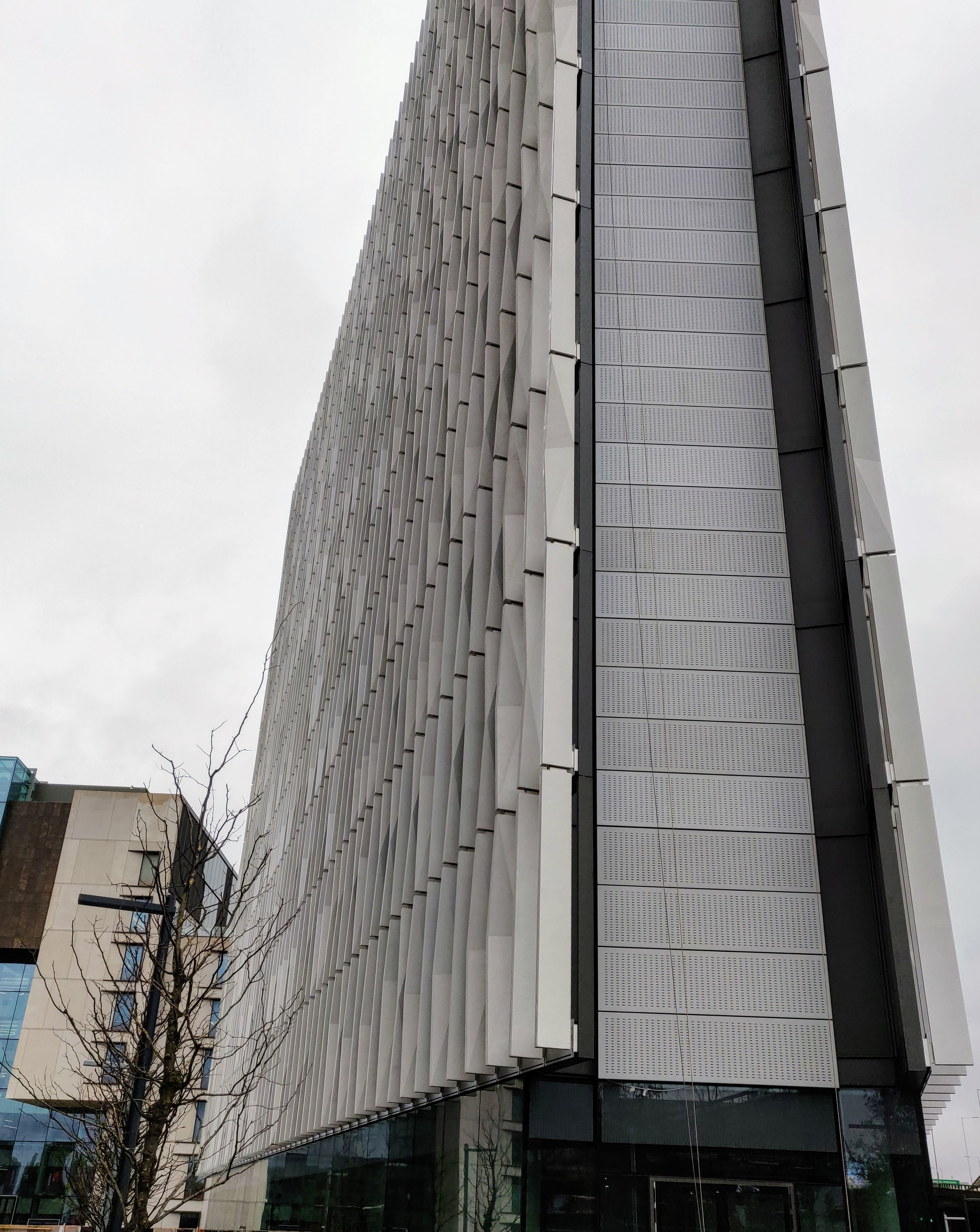
South-West Corner

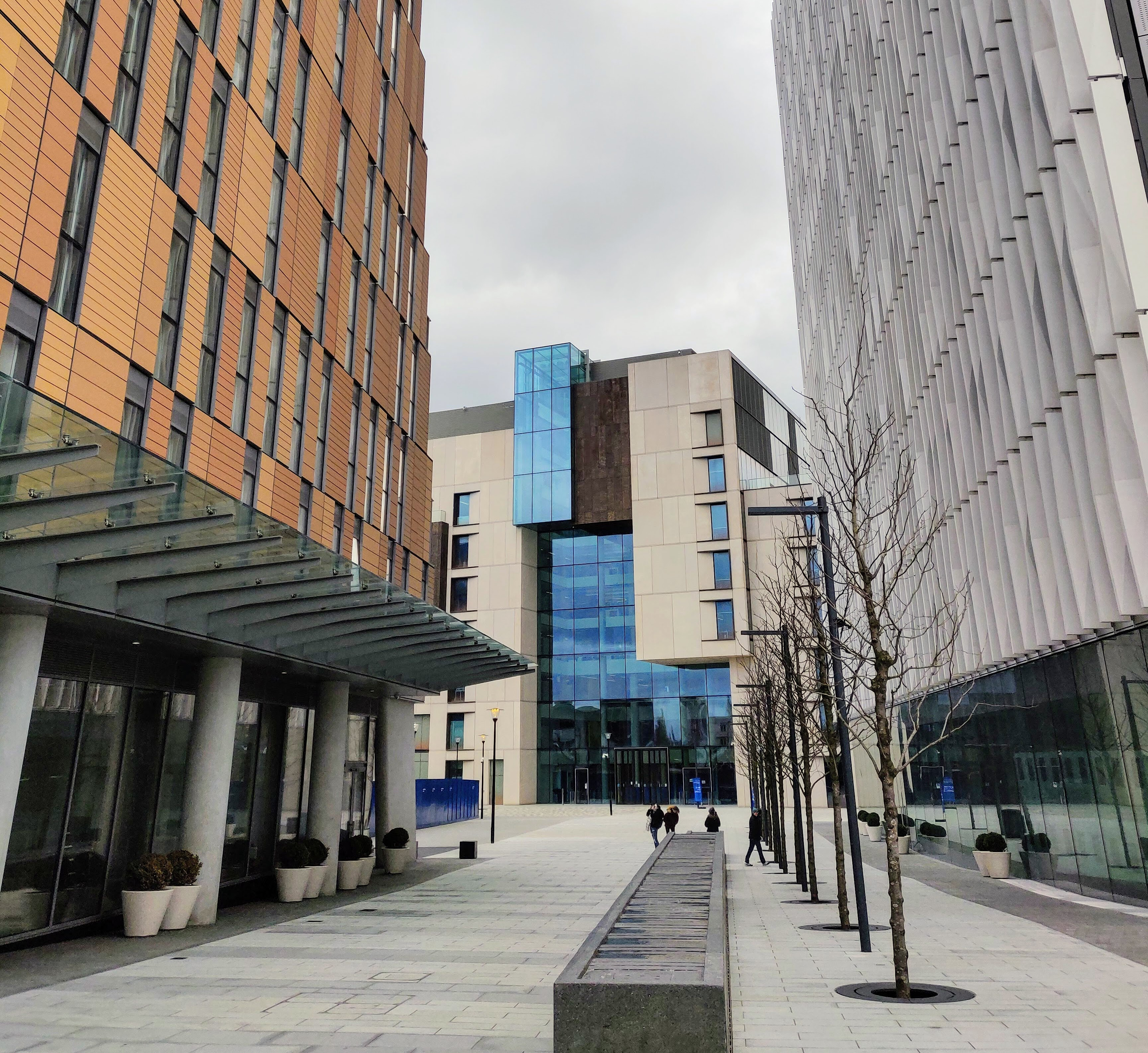
Entrance passage

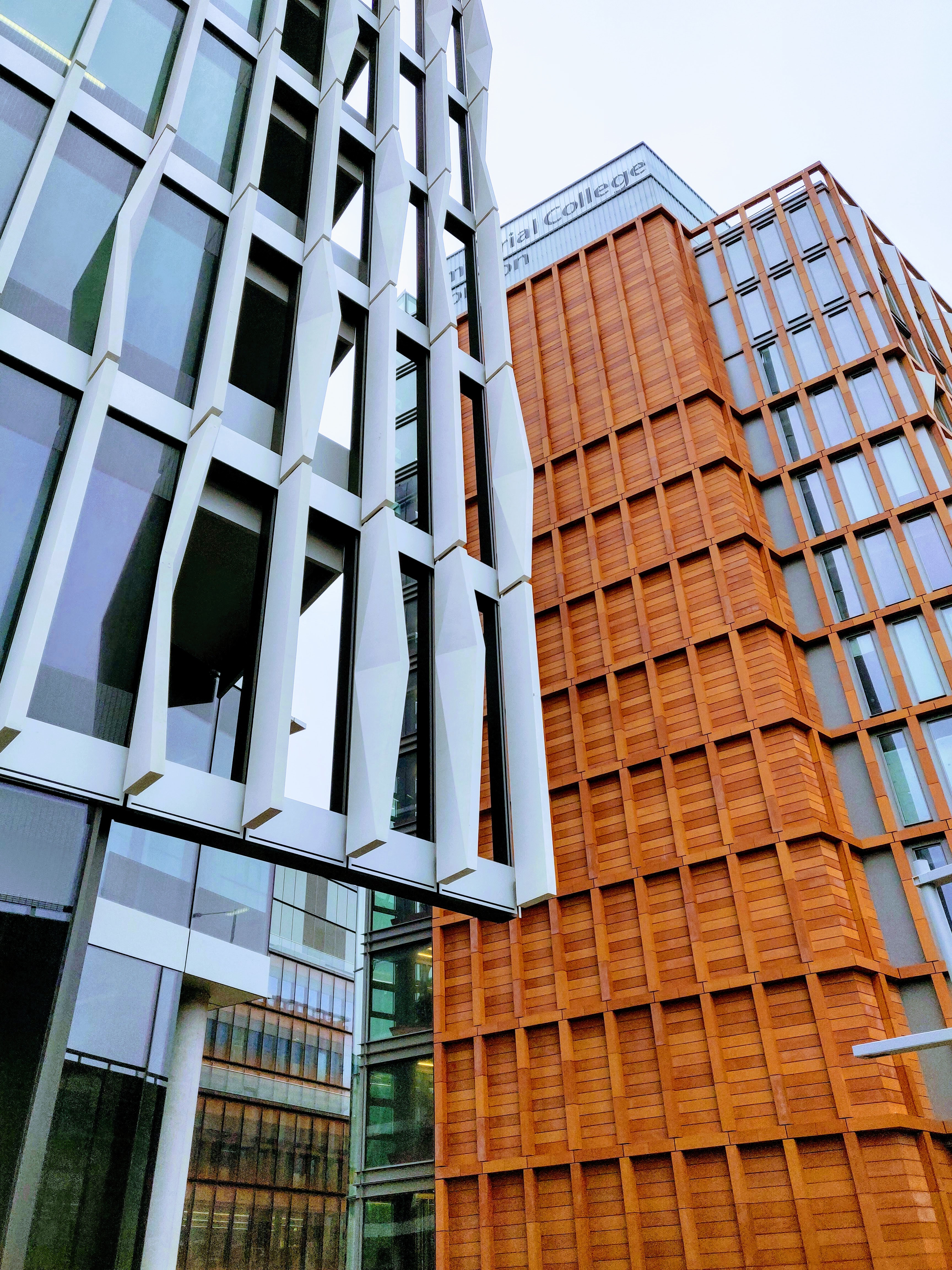
South Side

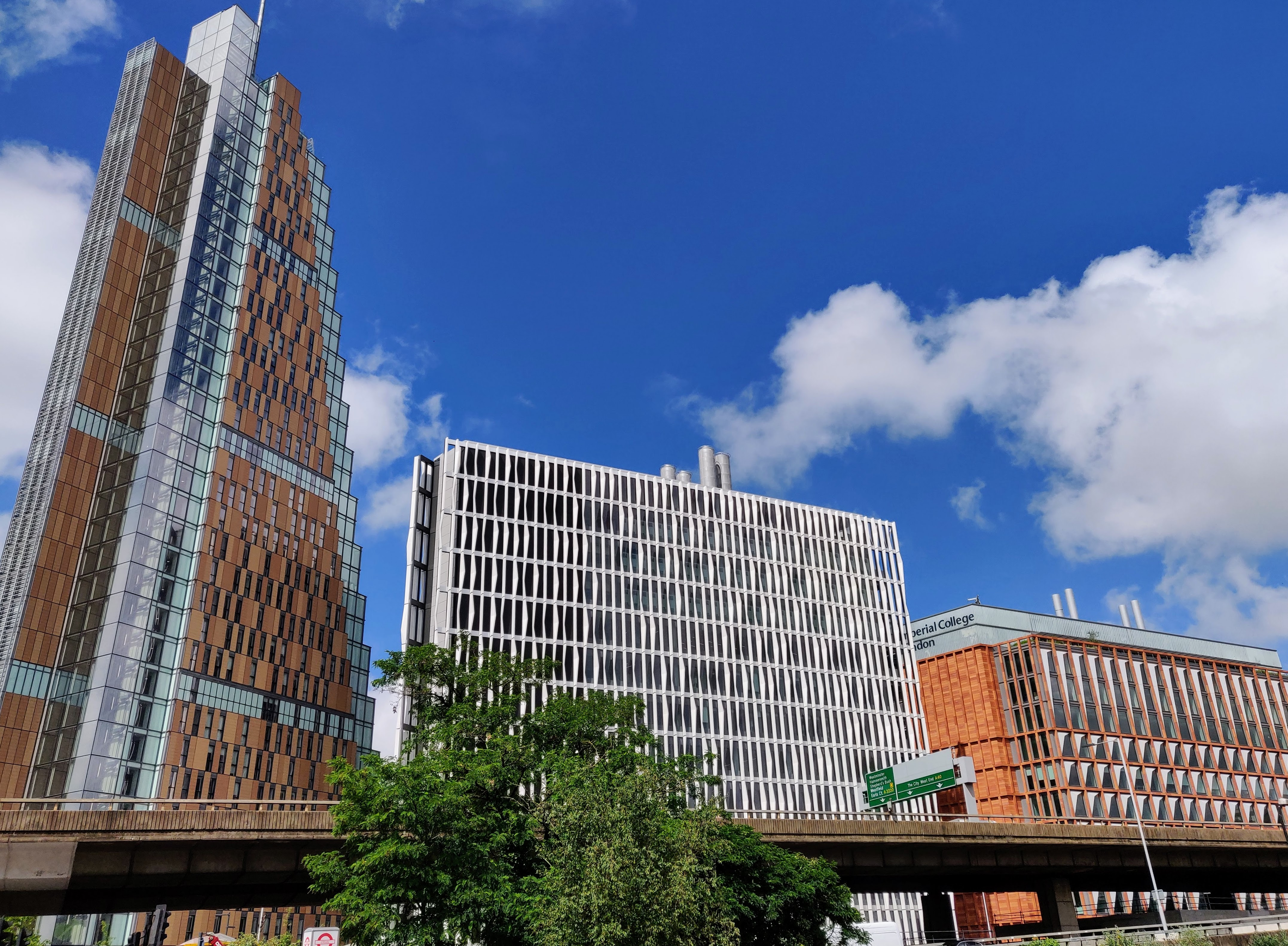
Adjacent buildings

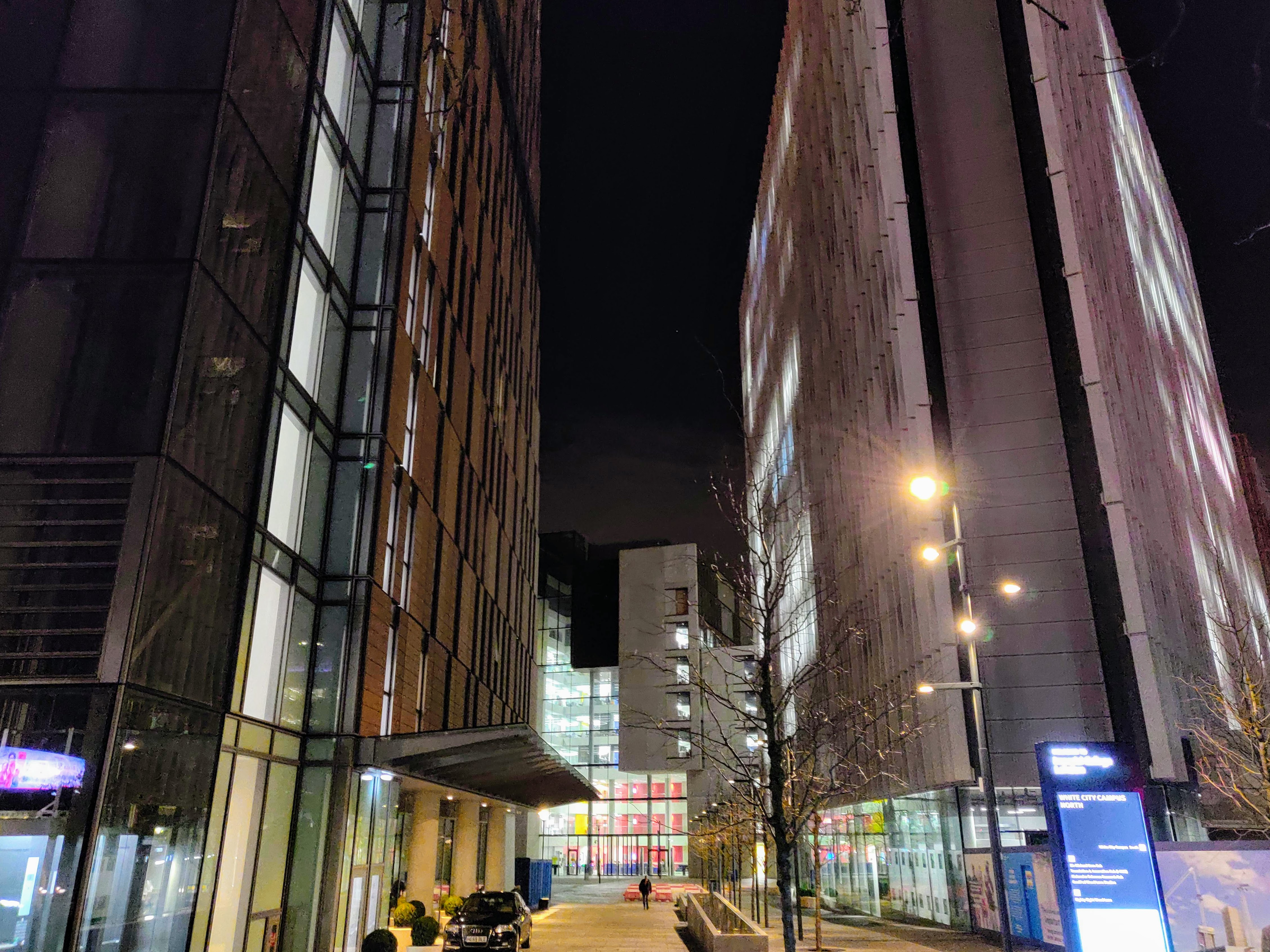
At night
