= Bernet =

Bernet is a surname. Notable people with the surname include:

- Agnès Bernet (born 1968), French cell biologist
- Ed Bernet (born 1933), American football player
- Henry Bernet (born 2007), Swiss tennis player
- John Joseph Bernet (1868–1935), American railroad executive
- Jordi Bernet (born 1944), Spanish comics artist
- Lee Bernet (born 1944), American football player

== See also ==
- BERNET, the Bangladesh Education and Research Network
