= Decision (European Union) =

Legislative act of the European Union

In European Union law, a decision is a legal instrument which is binding upon those individuals to which it is addressed. They are one of three kinds of legal instruments which may be effected under EU law which can have legally binding effects on individuals. Decisions may be addressed to member states or individuals. The Council of the European Union can delegate power to make decisions to the European Commission.

The legislative procedure for the adoption of a decision varies depending on its subject matter. The ordinary legislative procedure (formerly known as the codecision procedure) requires the agreement of and allows amendments by both the European Parliament and the Council of the European Union. The consent procedure requires the agreement of both Parliament and Council, but the Parliament can only agree or disagree to the text as a whole - it cannot propose amendments. The consultation procedure requires the agreement of the Council alone, the Parliament merely being consulted on the text. In some areas, such as competition policy, the Commission may itself issue decisions.

Common uses of decisions involve the Commission ruling on proposed mergers, and day-to-day agricultural matters (e.g. setting standard prices for vegetables).

On the basis of case law, decisions may have direct effect, that is to say they may be invoked by individuals before national courts.

The individuals or "undertakings" addressed by the decision will have "locus standi" to challenge the decision, but they must do so within 6 weeks.
