= Australasian Society for Experimental Psychology =

The Australasian Society for Experimental Psychology (ASEP) is a learned society for experimental psychologists. Its membership is based primarily in Australia and New Zealand. Its main function is to organise an annual conference, the Experimental Psychology Conference (EPC) (sometimes referred to as the Australasian Experimental Psychology Conference).

== The Society ==
The society was incorporated in Western Australia in 1997.

As of 2023, the society has had one permanent executive member: Emeritus Professor David Badcock as its Registered Public Officer.

The remainder of the executive each year are the members of that year's organizing committee of the Experimental Psychology Conference. Professor Badcock coordinates the activities of the society, including finding the next year's organizing committee chairperson. People who register for the conference become members of the society for that year.

== The Conference ==
The first Experimental Psychology Conference was held in 1974 at Monash University.

Prior to the inauguration of the Society in 1997, seed funding for each conference was provided by a bank account held by Monash University, requiring signatures of two people from the university. Information about that account was passed to each new organizing committee.

Since 1974, the conference has been held every year except for 2020, when it was cancelled because of the COVID-19 pandemic. The conferences have been organized by committee members from 20 different Australian universities and two New Zealand universities. Queensland University has hosted the conference most often: six times.

From at least 2004 to 2012, brief summaries of all presentations at conferences were published by the Australian Psychological Society. After that, each organizing committee produced an e-book of those summaries that could be downloaded from that conference's web site.

== See also ==
- List of learned societies
