= Association of Cost and Management Accountants =

Organization of Nigeria

The Association of Cost and Management Accountants is a professional accounting body, a non-profit organization in Nigeria. It was established to promote and encourage the study and enhance knowledge and efficiency in the development of the art and science of cost and management accountancy. As of December 2014 the Association had 3,916 members and 1,962 registered students.

== History ==
The association was established on 15 June 2006 under the Corporate Affairs Commission, Nigeria sequel to the approval of the Council meeting of the Chartered Institute of Cost and Management Accountants held on 4 March 2006. In April 2006, a technical committee was formed for the intention of preparation of the association's establishment proposal documents for submission to the Corporate Affairs Commission, Nigeria. The technical committee submitted the association's formation proposal documents in May 2006 to the Corporate Affairs Commission, Nigeria and the Corporate Affairs Commission, Nigeria approved the establishment of the association in June 2006.The association is an offshoot of the chartered institute of cost and management accountants.

== Membership ==
The membership of the association consists of two categories:

- The first category is the Associate Member with the designation letters of 'ACMA'
- The second and being the highest category is the Fellow Member with the designation letters of 'FCMA'

To be admitted to membership of the association, candidate must generally complete three years period of relevant work experience and passed a series of examinations of the association.

The association gives direct membership to holders of Associate Membership or Fellow Member's certificates of recognized professional accounting body from any country.
