= Natural person =

Real human being as opposed to a non-human legal person

In jurisprudence, a natural person (also physical person in some Commonwealth countries, or natural entity) is a person (in legal meaning, i.e., one who has its own legal personality) that is an individual human being, distinguished from the broader category of a legal person, which may be a private (i.e., business entity or non-governmental organization) or public (i.e., government) organization. Historically, a human being was not necessarily considered a natural person in some jurisdictions where slavery existed, but might instead be subject to a property right.

== Definitions ==
According to Maria Helena Diniz, an individual or natural person "is the human being considered as a subject of rights and obligations". Every human being is endowed with legal personality and, therefore, is a subject of law.

According to Sílvio de Salvo Venosa, "legal personality is a projection of the intimate, psychic personality of each person; it is a social projection of the psychic personality, with legal consequences". However, and in addition, the law also gives personality to other entities, formed by groups of people or assets: these are called legal person.

== Right to legal personality ==
Some international human rights documents and treaties recognise the right to be recognised as a legal person as an individual human right. Examples include Article 6 of the Universal Declaration of Human Rights or Article 3 the American Convention on Human Rights. This serves to prevent humans being stripped of their legal personality, as, for example, slaves were under some systems of slavery. Entities not considered persons would instead be understood as objects, and would be subject to property rights, as slaves were, for example, in Ancient Rome. Nowak considers this right to be one of the rare absolute human rights (meaning it is not possible to restrict it in any way), and additionally non-derogable.

== Legal consequences ==
In many cases, fundamental human rights are implicitly granted only to natural persons. For example, the Nineteenth Amendment to the United States Constitution, which states a person cannot be denied the right to vote based on their sex, or Section 15 of the Canadian Charter of Rights and Freedoms, which guarantees equality rights, apply to natural persons only. Another example of the distinction between natural and legal persons is that a natural person can hold public office, but a corporation cannot.

A corporation or non-governmental organization can, however, file a lawsuit or own property as a legal person.

== Crime ==
Usually a natural person perpetrates a crime, but legal persons may also commit crimes. In the U.S., animals that are not persons under U.S. law cannot commit crimes.

== By country ==
=== Germany ===
In Germany, legal entities (Rechtssubjekt) such as natural persons (Natürliche Person) have the capacity to be bearers of rights and obligations; they possess legal capacity. The point in time at which this legal capacity begins and ends is disputed in German case law and jurisprudence.

According to section 1 of the German Civil Code (BGB), a person acquires legal capacity on completion of their birth. However, in certain conditions, fetuses also have certain legal rights, for example, that of becoming an heir. The question of whether a fetus may have legal capacity as well has been left open by the Federal Court of Justice, although there are indications of a positive response. The German Civil Code grants the fetus, which does not have full legal capacity, essential rights, which are subject to the condition of subsequent live birth. The question of whether the fetus can have rights before birth and possibly from the beginning of pregnancy, in particular a right to life, is highly controversial.

== See also ==
- Legal person
- Personality rights
- Juridical person
- Natural person in French law
- Person (Catholic canon law)
- Great ape personhood
