= Chartered Institute of Cost and Management Accountants =

Nigeria-based professional body

The Chartered Institute of Cost and Management Accountants (CICMA) is a Nigerian-based professional accounting body offering accounting education and professional qualifications in cost and management accountancy and related subjects, focus on accounting, business and government operations. The head office of the institute is in Kaduna. The institute also has regional offices at Abuja, Kano, Jos and Port Harcourt. As at September 2015, it had 8,200 members working in and outside Nigeria. It also has 4,500 registered students.

The institute is recognized by the Financial Reporting Council of Nigeria as it is in its institutions list for education and promotion of cost and management accounting in Nigeria.

== History ==
The institute was founded in 2000, and was formally known as Institute of Cost and Management Accountants (ICMA). In the year 2002, the enabling Act establishing the institute commenced at the Nigerian National Assembly. At the House of Representatives, the word "Chartered" was added and the name of the institute was changed to "Chartered Institute of Cost and Management Accountants" On 25 May 2007, the Clerk of the Senate of the Federal Republic of Nigeria transmitted the CICMA Bill with other fourteen Bills to the then President Olusegun Obasanjo for his assent, but he left the office without signing any of the Bills from the National Assembly (Nigeria). The Act for the establishment of the institute is still pending Assent and Gazette.

In May 2006 an Expert Assessor's Committee from the Federal Ministry of Education, Abuja, visited for assessment of the programmes and qualification of the institute to advise the Office of the Head of Service of the Federation(OHCSF) on the standard/rating of relevance of the professional qualifications of the institute for entry into posts in the Federal Civil Service Commission(Nigeria). Their report states: “Having examined the Programmes and qualifications of ICMA, the Committee observed that they compare favorably with those of similar recognized accounting Bodies. It was therefore recommended that holders of ICMA qualifications be placed at par with their counterparts holding qualifications of similar Accounting Bodies such as Institute of Chartered Accountants of Nigeria(ICAN) and Association of National Accountants of Nigeria (ANAN).

In June 2006 CICMA established an offshoot known as the Association of Cost and Management Accountants. In 2011, the institute was listed among approved professional bodies in Nigeria by the Financial Reporting Council of Nigeria.

== Membership and certification ==
CICMA has two grades of full membership, Associate Members use the designatory letters "ACMA" and Fellow Members use the designatory letters "FCMA". To be admitted as an Associate, a candidate must have completed a period of relevant working experience and passed a series of examinations; candidates can also be admitted to membership by way of exemption or by accreditation of prior learning. To become a Fellow, a candidate must have been admitted an ACMA with five years post-nominal letters.
