= Ryan Ninan =

Indian first-class cricketer (born 1985)

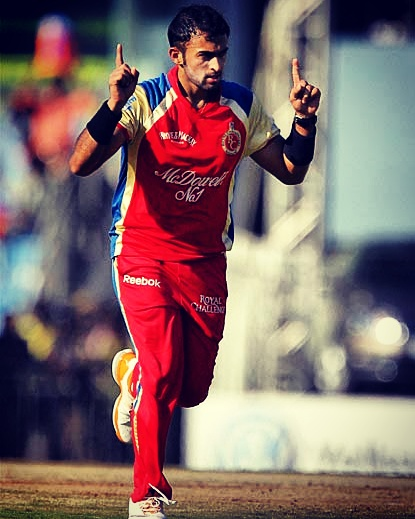

Personal information
- Full name: Ryan Behanan Ninan
- Born: 19 November 1985 (age 40); Thiruvananthapuram, Kerala, India
- Batting: Right-handed
- Bowling: Right-arm offbreak
- Role: Allrounder

Domestic team information
- Years: Team
- 2007/08: Goa
- 2009/10–2012/13: Karnataka
- 2011: Royal Challengers Bangalore
- Source: ESPNcricinfo, 22 January 2018

Ryan Behanan Ninan (born 19 November 1985) is an Indian first-class cricketer who played for Karnataka, Goa and Royal Challengers Bangalore. He moved to Melbourne in January 2014 for higher education and has been representing Kingston Hawks CC in the Victorian Premier Cricket competition since then. He was granted Australian permanent resident status in July 2017 and Cricket Australia, Cricket Victoria and Greg Chappell were instrumental in it being approved.

Ryan has most recently represented the Victorian Premier All stars in December 2015. He has accumulated a strong record in Victorian Premier Cricket, representing Kingston Hawthorn CC. In 4 seasons, Ryan took 97 wickets @23.37 and scored 1318 runs @27.46.

Ryan spent the 2016 Australian Winter playing for Grappenhall CC in the Cheshire County Division 1 League, topping the league batting averages with 546 @78 and taking 34 league wickets @18. He then spent the next two winters with Haagse CC in Holland, alongside South African Jonathan Vandiar in 2017 and young Queenslander Bryce Street the year after. Ryan took 24 wickets in both seasons (@19.62 in 2017 and @22.08 in 2018) alongside 282 runs @23.5 in 2017 and 336 @22.4 the year after.

Ryan made the move to Sydney for the 2019/20 season and had the best season of his career to date playing for Randwick Petersham Cricket Club alongside Big Bash stars Jason Sangha, Daniel Sams and Kent batsman Daniel Bell-Drummond. Ninan topped the wickets in the T20 Comp with 18 in 8 games @12.61 a piece.

== Early life ==
Ryan Ninan was born on 19 November 1985 in Thiruvananthapuram, Kerala to renowned environmental economist and author Dr. K.N. Ninan and Anne Ninan. Both his parents were born and brought up in East Africa before re-locating to India. His mother Anne Ninan is a Mathematics teacher. He is an alumnus of the Frank Anthony Public School and Jain University in Bangalore. He also most recently finished his post graduate in Sports Management from Deakin University, Melbourne.
