= Bangladesh National Geographical Association =

Learned society

- Formation: 1973
- Headquarters: Dhaka, Bangladesh
- Region served: Bangladesh
- Official language: Bengali

The Bangladesh National Geographical Association (Bengali: বাংলাদেশ জাতীয় ভূগোল সমিতি) is an association of geographers in Bangladesh.

== History ==
The Bangladesh National Geographical Association was established in 1973 by geographers in Dhaka. It publishes an academic journal called Journal of Bangladesh Geographical Association. The association runs a specialized geography library. It is funded through membership dues and journal sale. It currently has more than 600 members.
