= Yōgakushi Gakkai =

Yōgakushi Gakkai (The Society for the History of Western Learning in Japan / SHWLJ, 洋学史学会) is a learned society, founded in 1991, that aims to promote the study of the History of “Western Learning” (Yōgaku) in Japan during the Edo- and early Meiji-era, its place within the history of thought and science, and its relation to cultural, social, and political movements.

The SHWLJ meets every month except February and August. Each meeting features two papers by members or invited guests. Some monthly meetings are organized at selected locations throughout Japan.

The SHWLJ maintains close ties with other related learned societies and organizations such as the Nihon Kagakushi Gakkai (The History of Science Society of Japan), Nihon Ishi Gakkai (Japanese Society for the History of Medicine), Nihon Yakushi Gakkai (The Japanese Society for History of Pharmacy), Nihon Seishin-igakushi Gakkai (The Japanese Society for the History of Psychiatry).

The "Annals of the Society for the History of Western Learning in Japan" (Yogaku) are published as a journal of articles, source materials, reviews, translations, and bibliographical information. Submitted papers are peer-reviewed. Members also receive a Newsletter (Yogakushigakkai Tsushin).
