= Ghana Biomedical Convention =

The Ghana Biomedical Convention is multidisciplinary professional body that was established in 2007. The convention seeks to bring biomedical professionals from Ghana and the world over to share current researches in the field. The convention holds an annual convention called the Ghana Biomed.The first Biomed convention was held at the University of Ghana, Legon in 2008.

== 2011 Convention ==
The 2011 Biomed convention was held at the Kwame Nkrumah University of Science and Technology, Kumasi.
