= Jayanta Bandyopadhyay =

Indian professor and environmentalist

- Jayanta Bandyopadhyay
- Born: 31 December 1947 (age 78); India
- Citizenship: India
- Education: Indian Institute of Technology Kanpur
- Scientific career
- Fields: Environment and development
- Workplaces: Indian Institute of Management Calcutta

Jayanta Bandyopadhyay (Bengali: জয়ন্ত বন্দ‍্যোপাধ‍্যায়; born 31 December 1947 in Kolkata, India), is a researcher, analyst and author. He is now a Distinguished Fellow at the Observer Research Foundation, Kolkata. He is a Former Professor of the Indian Institute of Management Calcutta. An internationally renowned professional on public interest research, mountain environment and water governance in south Asia, Bandyopadhyay has authored sixteen critically acclaimed books and monographs, in addition to 150 papers and articles. He has delivered invited lectures in many parts of the world.

== Early life and education ==
Bandyopadhyay had his schooling in Kolkata after which he studied engineering. He received a Master of Technology degree in 1969 and PhD in 1976 in Engineering Physics from Indian Institute of Technology Kanpur. After obtaining his doctorate, he turned his research interest to the interdisciplinary area of Science and the Natural Environment. He soon got deeply interested in research on the Himalaya. His professional life started to revolve around environment and economic growth in the world's mountains. In 1977 he joined the Massachusetts Institute of Technology, Cambridge, USA, as a visiting post-doctoral fellow in the area of science and public policy.

== Career ==
Following his work for a doctorate in Physics of Metals Bandyopadhyay has been closely associated with research on science, environment and economy in the mountains, in particular the Hindu Kush Himalaya (HKH) in Asia.

His research contribution on the rivers emerging from the HKH mountain has been widely acclaimed. He has been a member of the faculty at IIM Bangalore, the International Centre for Integrated Mountain Development, Kathmandu, and the International Academy of Environment (IAE), Geneva. In 1991 he was invited by the Earth Summit Secretariat in Geneva to draft a chapter for Agenda-21 on the world's mountains. In 1997 he was invited by the Indian Institute of Management Calcutta (IIMC) to establish the Centre for Development and Environment Policy (CDEP). With his professional leadership, the CDEP attracted global attention. He retired from his position at IIMC in 2012 and spent a year at the Jawaharlal Nehru University, New Delhi as a Visiting Professor. Presently he is a Distinguished Fellow at the Observer Research Foundation, Kolkata chapter. He has been an adviser to the International Union for Conservation of Nature (IUCN) New Delhi, and the Water Diplomacy Program at Tufts University, Medford, USA.

He recently acted as a review-editor for the Report on Himalayan Monitoring and Assessment Programme (HIMAP) of ICIMOD, Kathmandu. The central contribution of Bandyopadhyay is an interdisciplinary approach to the understanding of mountain areas and governance of the ten large rivers emerging from the Himalaya.

Bandyopadhyay served as the President of Indian Society for Ecological Economics (2006–08); President of SaciWATERS (2000–09); Chair of Scientific Advisory Committee, GB Pant Institute of Himalayan Environment and Development (2007–12); and as Board Member, International Society for Ecological Economics (2007–09). He was the Coordinating Lead Author for "Freshwater Ecosystem Services" in Millennium Ecosystem Assessment.

== Selected bibliography ==
=== Books and monographs ===
- Governing the Water Tower of Asia Monograph Observer Research Foundation March 2022
- Environmental Sustainability from the Himalayas to the Oceans: Struggles and Innovations in China and India (New York, Springer) Co-edited 2017.
- IRBM for Brahmaputra Sub-basin: Water Governance, Environmental Security and Human Well-being (New Delhi, Observer Research Foundation) Co-authored 2016.
- Environmental Governance: Approaches, Imperatives and Methods (New Delhi, Bloomsbury) Co-edited, 2012
- The Indian Sundarbans Delta: A Vision (New Delhi, WWF-India), co-authored, forthcoming in 2011
- Water, Agriculture and Sustainable Well-being (New Delhi, Oxford University Press) 2009 (co-edited)
- Water, Ecosystems and Society: A Confluence of Disciplines (New Delhi, Sage) 2009 (authored)
- Report of the Task Force on the Mountain Ecosystems – Eleventh Five-Year Plan (New Delhi, Planning Commission, Government of India) 2006 (Co-authored)
- Integrated Water Systems Management in South Asia: A Framework for Research CDEP Occasional Paper 09 (Kolkata, Indian Institute of Management Calcutta) 2006 (authored)
- Biodiversity and Quality of Life (New Delhi, MacMillan) 2005 (co-edited)
- Moving the Mountains Up in the Global Environmental Agenda CDEP Occasional Paper 03 (Kolkata, Indian Institute of Management Calcutta) 2004 (co-authored)
- Freshwater for India's Children and Nature (New Delhi: UNICEF & WWF) 1998 (co-authored)
- Mountains of the World: A Global Priority (London: Parthenon) 1997 (editorial advisor and joint coordinator for production).
- Structural Transformation Processes Towards Sustainable Development in India and Switzerland (Bern, Swiss National Science Foundation) May 1996 (co-authored).
- Natural Resource Management in the Mountain Environment: the Case of Doon Valley Occasional Paper14 (Kathmandu: ICIMOD) 1989 (authored)
- Science and Technology in the Asia-Pacific Region (Paris: UNESCO) 1989 (authored).
- India's Environment: Crises and Responses (Dehradun: Natraj Publishers) 1985 (co-edited)
