= Inter-American Congress of Philosophy =

The Inter-American Congress of Philosophy (Congreso Interamericano de Filosofía) is a regional meeting of philosophers in the Americas. It was conceived during the Second World War to encourage better hemispheric understanding, with the idea that philosophical interchange could be part of a collective response to irrationality and violence. The first Inter-American Congress of Philosophy was held in Port-au-Prince, Haiti in 1944, the second was held in New York in 1947 and the third was held Mexico City in 1950. Since 1954 these meetings have been held regularly under the auspices of the Sociedad Interamericana de Filosofía (SIF). The 19th Inter-American Congress of Philosophy was held in Montevideo, Uruguay in December 2024.

Notable philosophers who have helped organize these events include Roderick Chisholm, Marvin Farber, Risieri Frondizi, Eduardo García Máynez, Miguel Giusti, Camille Lhérisson, Miguel Reale, Francisco Romero, Ernest Sosa, and Leopoldo Zea. The publications from the Inter-American Congress of Philosophy have been digitized and preserved by the Philosophy Documentation Center.
