= Michael Uren =

British businessman and philanthropist (1923–2019)

Sir Michael Uren OBE
- Born: John Michael Leal Uren; 1 September 1923
- Died: 9 August 2019 (aged 95)
- Education: Sherborne School, Imperial College London
- Occupations: Businessman, philanthropist

Sir John Michael Leal Uren OBE (1 September 1923 – 9 August 2019) was a British businessman. He served as the chairman of Civil & Marine from 1955 to 2006. He donated GBP £40 million to his alma mater, Imperial College London, becoming the most generous benefactor in the College’s history.

== Early life ==
Michael Uren was born on 1 September 1923. He was educated at Sherborne School and Imperial College London, from which he graduated in 1943 with a BSc in Mechanical Engineering and Motive Power.

== Career ==
Uren founded Civil & Marine, a manufacturer of ground granulated blast-furnace slag, in 1955. In the 80’s his company developed the technology that allowed them to make high-quality cement from blast-furnace slag, a waste product of the steel industry. Uren and his business partner John Hobbins turned this invention into a profitable business.

He served as its Chairman until he sold it for GBP£245 million in 2006 to the Hanson Group.

As of 2015, he was worth an estimated GBP£170 million.

== Philanthropy ==
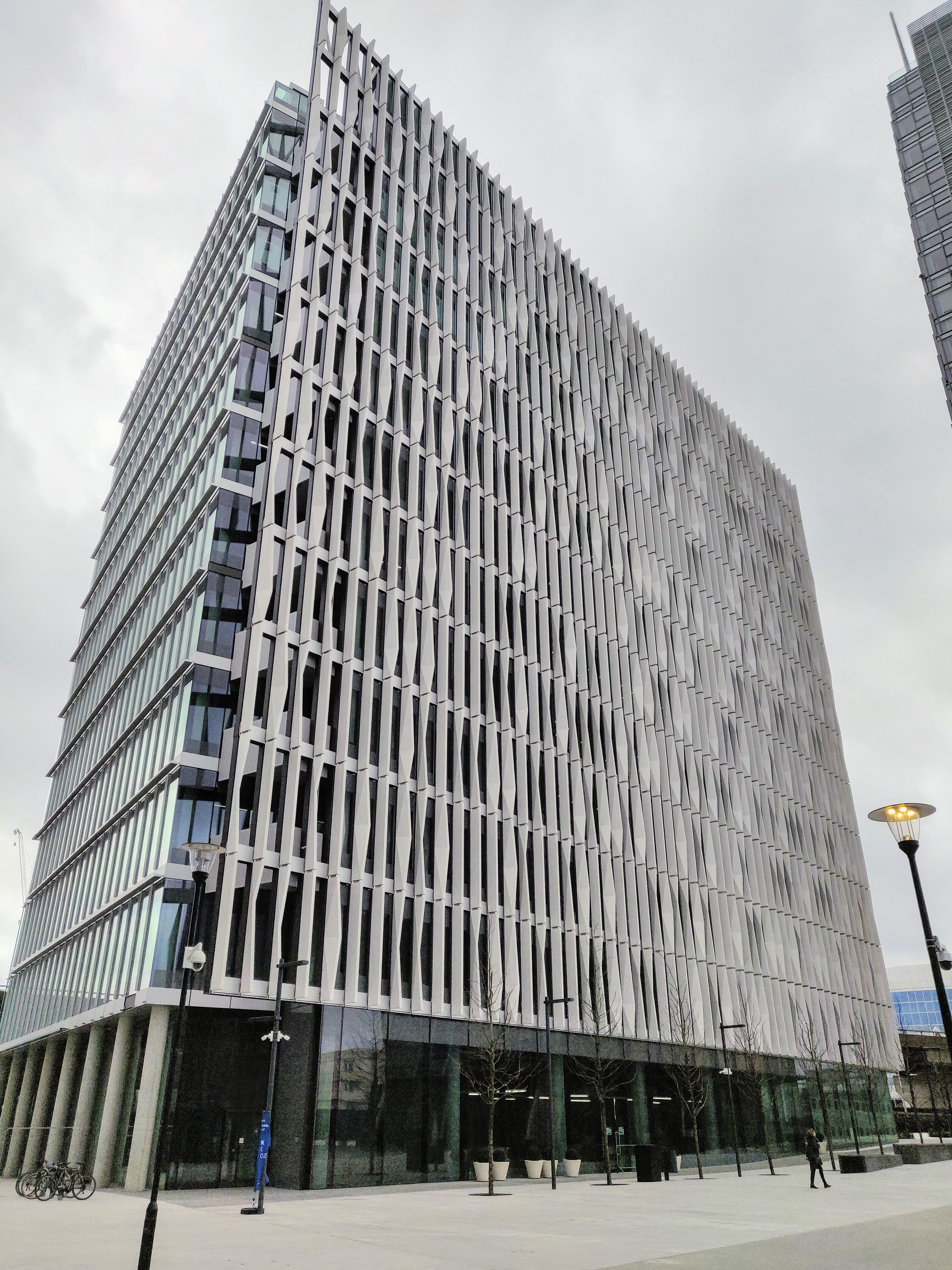
Sir Michael Uren Building, White City, from north side

Uren served as the chairman of the Royal London Society for the Blind.

Uren donated GBP £30 million to the King Edward VII's Hospital Sister Agnes in 2013. In 2014, he also donated GBP£40 million to his alma mater, Imperial College London, to fund the creation of the College's new "Bio-Medical Engineering Research Centre" in White City, London, which he envisioned as becoming a cornerstone for "a new Silicon Valley" of biotechnology.

== Honours ==
Uren was appointed an Officer of the Order of the British Empire (OBE) in the 1999 Birthday Honours for services to the Royal London Society For the Blind. He was knighted in the 2016 New Year Honours for philanthropic services.

== Death ==
He died on 9 August 2019 at the age of 95.
