= Association internationale d'études occitanes =

International scholarly association

The Association internationale d'études occitanes (Occitan: Associacion Internacionala d'estudis occitans), abbreviated to AIEO, is an international scholarly organization whose mission is the study and promotion of the Occitan language spoken in the south of France, the northeast of Spain, specifically in the Val d'Aran, and the northwest of Italy. Members of the AIEO include scholars, academics, students, and those interested in Occitania.

The AIEO was formally organized in 1981 and held its first international congress in 1984, in Southampton, England. Congresses are generally held every three years, attracting scholars from around the world; the tradition is to alternate between venues in Occitan-speaking regions and non-Occitan-speaking regions. Each congress has been followed by the publication of Acts. As of September 2023, congresses have been held in the cities of Southampton (1984), Turin (1987), Montpellier (1990), Vitoria-Gasteiz (1993), Toulouse (1996), Vienna (1999), Reggio Calabria and Messina (2002), Bordeaux (2005), Aachen (2008), Béziers (2011), Lleida (2014), and Albi (2017). The conference scheduled for Cuneo (2020) was abbreviated and held online because of COVID-19 pandemic concerns; in-person meetings resumed with the 2023 congress in Munich.

The AIEO is governed by a Council elected by its members at the triennial congress. Past presidents include Peter T. Ricketts (1981-1990), Q. I. M. (Kees) Mok (1990-1993), Georg Kremnitz (1993-2005), Walter Meliga (2005-2014), and Rosa Maria Medina Granda (2014-2023), of the University of Oviedo. The current president is Miriam Cabré, of the University of Girona.

Among its activities, the AIEO has published a journal and currently publishes a book series, Publications de l'AIEO, produced by Brepols, a Belgian publishing house. The AIEO's website hosts the Trésor Manuscrit de l'Ancien Occitan (TMAO), a searchable database of Occitan vocabulary compiled from legal, religious, pedagogical, practical, and literary texts dating from the earliest Occitan documents to 1492. Access to TMAO is a benefit of AIEO membership; the data is available only to AIEO members.
