= Montenegrin Sports Academy =

The Montenegrin Sports Academy (MSA) is a sport scientific society founded in 2003 in Podgorica, Montenegro, dedicated to the collection, generation and dissemination of scientific knowledge in the multidisciplinary area of sports sciences. It is led by the founders and co-founders of three scientific journals: Montenegrin Journal of Sports Science and Medicine; Sport Mont; and Journal of Anthropology of Sport and Physical Education. It also organizes an annual scientific conference, which hosted 364 authors and 222 participants from 50 countries in 2019.

== Objective and purpose ==
The MSA is the leading association of sport scientists at the Montenegrin level and practices extensive co operations with corresponding non-Montenegrin associations. The purpose of the Academy is the promotion of science and research, with special attention to sport science across Montenegro and beyond. Its topics include the motivation, attitudes, values and responses, adaptation, performance and health aspects of people engaged in physical activity and the relation of physical activity and lifestyle to health, prevention and aging. These topics are dealt with on an interdisciplinary basis.

== Function ==
The MSA is a non-profit organization. It supports Montenegrin institutions, such as the Ministry of Education and Sports and the Council of Youth and Sports, by offering scientific advice and assistance for coordinated Montenegrin, European and worldwide research projects defined by these bodies. Additionally it serves as the most important Montenegrin network of sport scientists from all relevant sub disciplines.

== Membership ==
The MSA offers individual membership to sport and related scientists. The objective is to create a scientific Montenegrin, European and worldwide network for scientific exchange and interaction. This is strengthened by the annual Congresses and other membership benefits such as the Montenegrin Journal of Sports Science and Medicine (MJSS), Email Newsletters, etc. The qualification for the MSA membership students is a university level degree (master's or doctor's degree, university examination) in the field of sport science, or an equivalent university degree in other related areas. Members comprise scientists from all areas of sport science such as Physiology, Sports Medicine, Psychology, Molecular Biology, Sociology, Biochemistry, Motor Control, Biomechanics, Training Science and many more.

== Congresses ==
Annual Congresses have been organized since the inauguration of the MSA in 2003. The MSA Congresses are attended by sport scientists worldwide with an academic career. On average over 70% of the participants have at least a PhD or an equivalent in the field of sport science or a related discipline. Future MSA Congresses include 2014 Podgorica, comprises a range and selection of invited lecturers, as well as serious of various debates through oral and poster presentation.
