= Bangladesh Entomological Society =

Bangladeshi learned society

- Formation: 1990
- Headquarters: Gazipur, Bangladesh
- Region served: Bangladesh
- Official language: Bengali

The Bangladesh Entomological Society (Bengali: বাংলাদেশ কীটতত্ত্ব সমিতি) is a Bangladeshi learned society of entomologists.

== History ==
The Bangladesh Entomological Society was established in 1990. The original constitution of the society allowed for the headquarters to be based in Bangladesh Agricultural Research Institute, Bangladesh Agricultural University, and Bangladesh Rice Research Institute. Its present headquarters are at Bangladesh Agricultural Research Institute in Joydebpur, Gazipur. It publishes an academic journal called the Bangladesh Journal of Entomology.

In November 2017, the Bangladesh Entomological Society held its 10th biennial conference. The chief guest was Meher Afroz Chumki, State Minister of Women and Children Affairs.
