= Bangladesh Astronomical Association =

Bangladeshi learned society

- Abbreviation: BAA
- Formation: 1988
- Headquarters: Dhaka, Bangladesh
- Region served: Bangladesh
- Members: 500+
- Official language: Bengali
- Website: www.astronomybangla.com

Bangladesh Astronomical Association (Bengali: বাংলাদেশ অ্যাস্ট্রোনমিক্যাল অ্যাসোসিয়েশন) is a Bangladeshi learned society of astronomers.

== History ==
Bangladesh Astronomical Association was established on 5 May 1988 in Dhaka by Bangladeshi astronomers. It organizes the Dhaka Mahakash Utsab (Dhaka space festival) biennially. The association publishes one academic journal and one bi-monthly magazine; which are respectively The Bangladesh Journal of Astronomical Research and Mahakash Barta. The association runs the Meghnad Saha Scientific Information Centre and Library. It has over 500 members. In 1990 the association started the 'Bruno Award' for recognizing astronomy research in Bangladesh.

The Association holds workshops on astronomy in Bangladesh. In 2007, the association sent a team to the First International Olympiad on Astronomy and Astro-physics in Singapore to represent Bangladesh.

In 2009, the Bangladesh Astronomical Association held the 5th Astro-Olympiad in Dhaka. The association has published a number of books on astronomy. The association in collaboration with the Russian Center for Science and Culture observed the birthday of Konstantin Tsiolkovsky. The association organizes free star gazing events every Friday. In 2014, the 9th Astro-Olympiad was held in Narayanganj. The winners would be sent to International Olympiad on Astronomy and Astrophysics and the International Astronomy Olympiad to represent Bangladesh.
