= Fundación Italia =

The Fundación Italia is a cultural institution from Rosario, Argentina. It was created in 1985 to "promote arts, science and technique", by people who boast a "cultural bond with Italy". Although most of the people that work in the organization are Italian Argentines, the institution's activities are far from being restricted to Italian culture, being orientated to widen Rosario's cultural life.

The Fundacion Italia has sponsored successful musical interpretations in Rosario, such as Requiem, by Giuseppe Verdi, Madame Butterfly by Giacomo Puccini and Napoli in Concerto, a Neapolitan music compilation.

In 2007 begun a seminary of classic literature, the first one being Homer, that will be followed by Virgil in 2008 and Dante Alighieri in 2009.

The institution has invited some of the most prominent personalities of the country to give lectures about the situation of Argentina and its future. Among the countless politicians, economists, historians, intellectuals and lawyers are the following:

- Tomáš Abrahám, philosopher and sociologist.
- Giorgio Alberti, licensed in Politics and Sociology.
- Jorge Asis, journalist.
- Hermes Binner, governor of the province of Santa Fe.
- Silvia Bleichmar, psychoanalyst.
- Miguel Angel Broda, economist.
- Mario Bunge, physician, mathematician and philosopher.
- Domingo Cavallo, former Minister of Economy.
- Eduardo Duhalde, former president of Argentina.
- Jose Luis Espert, economist.
- Luis Alberto Lacalle Herrera, former president of Uruguay.
- Ricardo Lagos, former president of Chile.
- Miguel Lifschitz, mayor of Rosario.
- Félix Luna, historian.
- Pacho O'Donnell, historian.
- Alfonso Prat Gay, former president of the Argentine Central Bank.
- Cristiano Ratazzi, president of Fiat in Argentina.
- Carlos Alberto Reutemann, former governor of the province of Santa Fe
- Felipe Rovera, former president of General Motors in Argentina.
- Alejandro Rozitchner, writer and philosopher.
- Beatriz Sarlo, writer.
- Fernando Solanas, Argentine filmmaker.
- Eugenio Raul Zaffaroni, minister of the Supreme Court in Argentina.
