= Indian Association of Clinical Psychology =

Indian Association of Clinical Psychologists (IACP) is the national association of clinical psychologists in India. It was founded in 1968. As of 2023, the President of the association is Dr. Dherandra Kumar. IACP publishes its flagship journal entitled Indian Journal of Clinical Psychology (IJCP). IACP confers following professional awards in clinical psychology:

1. C S Kang Award for overall contributions in clinical psychology
2. H N Murthy Award for contributions in behavioral medicine and bio-feedback
3. Psycho-Oration for life time contribution in substance use disorder and mental health
4. Child and adolescent award previously known as Asha Nigam award for work in child and adolescent mental health
5. S C Gupta Best Paper for the best presentation in the NACIACP scientific sessions
6. Young Scientist award (age limit below 35 years of age) who has done a commendable research work
7. Forensic Psychology Award
8. Awards for best paper in each session of its National Annual Conference

IACP celebrated its Golden Jubilee Year in 2018 by holding 44th National Annual Conference of Indian Association of Clinical Psychologists on 23–25 February 2018 at Gautam Buddha University, Greater Noida, U.P. 45th National Annual Conference of Indian Association of Clinical Psychologists is scheduled on 25–27 May 2019 at National Institute for the Empowerment of Persons with Visual Disabilities (Divyangjan), Dehradun, India. 46NACIACP was held in Panjab University Chandigarh from 21-23 February 2020 by Organising Director Dr Manoj Kumar Bajaj, Associate Professor of Clinical Psychology, Government Medical College and hospital sector 32 Chandigarh India.
