= Nihon Ishi Gakkai =

Japanese juridical corporation

Nihon Ishi Gakkai (日本医史学会), Japanese Society for the History of Medicine, JSHM) is a juridical corporation (shadan hōjin) established in 1892 by the physician Fujikawa Yū and several colleagues in order to promote the study, research and communication of the history of medicine and allied sciences in all of its aspects. The secretariat of the society is housed in the Departement of Medical History, Juntendo University (Tokyo).

The Japanese Society for the History of Medicine publishes the Nihon Ishigaku Zasshi – Journal of the Japanese Society for the History of Medicine. It offers two scientific awards, the Fujikawa-Yū-Award (the former Scientific Promotion Award) and the Yakazu-Award.

== Literature ==
- Nihon Ishi Gakkai sōkai hyakkai kinenshi. Tokyo: Nihon Ishi Gakkai, 2000.

== See also ==
- Nihon Yakushi Gakkai
- Yōgakushi Gakkai
