= Nihon Yakushi Gakkai =

Learned society based in Japan

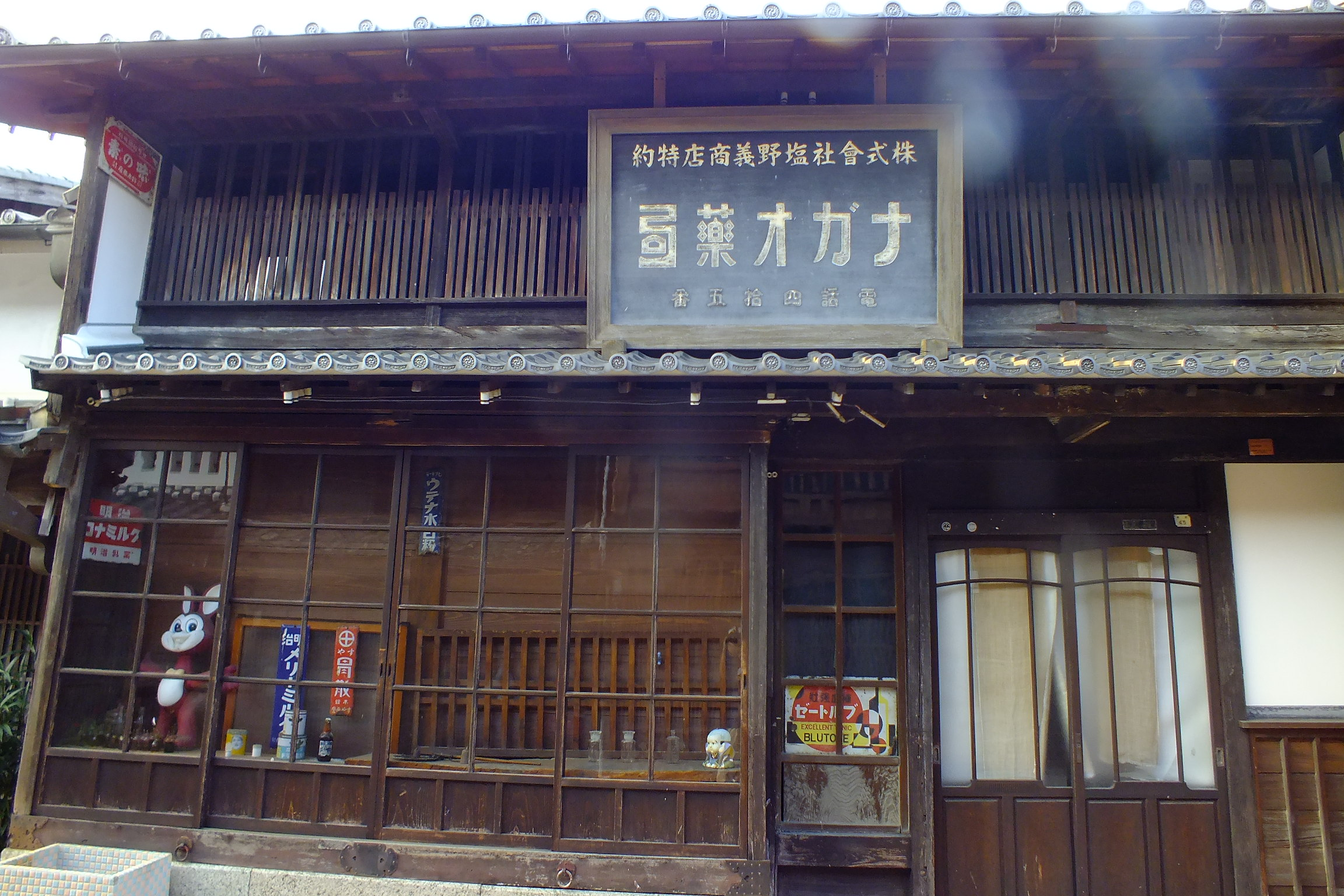
An Edo period pharmacy in Seki-juku along the Tōkaidō road

Nihon Yakushi Gakkai (The Japan Society for the History of Pharmacy / JSHP, 日本薬史学会) is a learned society, which aims to promote the study of the history of pharmacy and to contribute to the development of Japanese pharmaceutical science.

== History ==
The JSHP was founded in 1954 by the chemist Dr. Yasuhiko Asahina (朝比奈泰彦, 1880–1975), Professor emeritus at the University of Tokyo, who also became the first president. The JSHP maintains close relationships with related institutions and learned societies such as the Yōgakushi Gakkai (The Society for the History of Western Learning in Japan) and Nihon Ishi Gakkai (Japanese Society for the History of Medicine).

== Journal ==
Since 1966, the JSHP has published a biannual journal Yakushigaku Zasshi (The Japanese Journal for History of Pharmacy). English abstracts are accessible from 2015 on. Back-numbers are available as pdf-files from the JSHP’s website. In 2016 the society published an extensive "Encyclopedia of Pharmaceutical History" (Yakushigaku Jiten) with contributions of more than 80 experts.
