= Consent procedure =

EU legislative procedure

The consent procedure (formerly assent procedure) is one of the special legislative procedures of the European Union. Introduced by the Single European Act, under this procedure, the Council of the European Union must obtain the European Parliament's consent (assent) before certain decisions can be made.

== Application ==
Under the Treaty of Lisbon, the consent procedure's applications include:

- horizontal flexibility clause (art. 352 TFEU),
- combating discrimination (Article 19(1) TFEU),
- membership of the Union (Article 49 TEU),
- arrangements for withdrawal from the Union (Article 50 TEU)
- association agreements,
- accession of the Union to the ECHR,
- agreements establishing a specific institutional framework,
- agreements with important budgetary implications,
- agreements in areas where the ordinary legislative procedure applies.

== History ==
=== Single European Act ===
The assent procedure was introduced by the Single European Act. Under this procedure, the Council of the European Union must obtain Parliament's assent before certain decisions can be made. Acceptance ("assent") requires an absolute majority of votes.

The European Parliament can accept or reject the proposal but not amend it. However, the Parliament can produce an interim report making recommendations for modifications, and a conciliation has also been introduced.

The areas included under the assent procedure were:

- specific tasks of the European Central Bank (ECB);
- amendments of statutes of the European System of Central Banks (ESCB) / European Central Bank;
- Structural Funds and Cohesion Funds;
- the uniform electoral procedure for the European Parliament;
- certain international agreements;
- the accession of new member states;
- approval of the President and the other members of the Commission

=== Treaty of Amsterdam ===
Following the adoption of the Treaty of Amsterdam, sanctions imposed on an EU Member State for a serious and persistent breach of fundamental rights requires Parliament's assent under Article 7 of the EU Treaty.

In its opinion on the 2000 Intergovernmental Conference, the European Commission argued in favor of extending this procedure to apply to the conclusions of agreements having global economic and commercial implications.

=== Lisbon Treaty ===
With entry into force of the Lisbon Treaty in 2009, the assent procedure was renamed consent procedure, and it was defined as part of the special legislative procedures, as opposed to ordinary legislative procedure (formerly codecision).

Under the consent procedure, the Parliament express its approval on a Council draft act by an absolute majority vote, without possibility to amend it. Informally, the Parliament is involved by the Commission since the beginning of the procedure, in order to guarantee its consent, although the Treaties do not formally prescribe it.
