= Bangladesh Research and Education Network =

Non-profit government trust

Bangladesh Research And Education Network Trust (BdREN)
- Formation: 2009
- Headquarters: Dhaka, Bangladesh
- Region served: Bangladesh
- Official language: Bengali
- Website: www.bdren.net.bd

Bangladesh Research And Education Network (BdREN) is a non-profitable government trust (Autonomous).

Previously it was an educational project governed by the University Grants Commission of Bangladesh and jointly financed by Bangladesh Government and World Bank aimed at constructing a cooperative network among the universities of Bangladesh for better research capability.

Bangladesh Research And Education Network was established in 2009. A trust was established in 2019. The trust has 78 private and state-owned universities as members. The network is financed by the Government of Bangladesh and the World Bank.

The central node of the network is in the premises of the BUGC situated at Agargaon, Sher-e-Bangla Nagar, Dhaka.

== See also ==
- University Grants Commission of Bangladesh (BUGC)
