= International Society of Technology in Arthroplasty =

International organization

The International Society for Technology in Arthroplasty (ISTA) is an international organization which focusses on new technologies in arthroplasty. It held its first meeting in Berlin in 1987 and subsequently met every year, alternating between the United States and Europe. It was formally known as the International Society for the Study of Custom Prostheses (ISSCP) and became the International Society of Technology in Arthroplasty in 1994.
