= International Association of Amateur Heralds =

The International Association of Amateur Heralds (IAAH) is a group of heraldic enthusiasts from around the world that exists to discuss all aspects of heraldry. It was formerly known only as the Association of Amateur Heralds, or AAH. The Association exists only in cyberspace and was created to encourage the art and science of heraldry through helping people with heraldic enquiries. The Association's stated aim is promotion and education in the fields of the art and science of heraldry. This vision was the core driving principle of the Association's foundation. Although people and positions change, the Association continues to grow and evolve. The founding principles remain intact, as a result of contributions by volunteers from among its membership acting in various capacities. Members contribute articles on the subject of heraldry, refine the Association's articles and bylaws, and service arms design requests by members of the public. Members continue to contribute towards the roll of arms which reflects the work of the Association's heralds and heraldic artists.

The IAAH President for 2025/26 is Christian Green, a retired British diplomat living in Sweden.

Coat of arms of International Association of Amateur Heralds
Notes The Association of Amateur Heralds successfully applied for a registration of Armorial Bearings with the South African Bureau of Heraldry in 2002 with a certificate being issued on 16 January of that year. Application for the AAH coat of arms with the South African Bureau of Heraldry appears in the South African Government Gazette No. 22518, Notice 713. Registration of the AAH coat of arms with the South African Bureau of Heraldry appears in the South African Government Gazette No. 22786, Notice 1075. Crest A Mouse sejant affronte Or langued Gules holding in its forepaws a paintbrush bendwise Proper. Escutcheon Per pale Gules and Sable an antique coronet within eight escutcheons in orle Or. Motto With Open Arms
