= Alison McGregor =

Physiotherapist and biomedical engineer

- Education: University of Surrey; King's College London
- Scientific career
- Workplaces: Imperial College London
- Thesis: The assessment of spinal motion and its relevance to low back pain (1997)

Alison Hazel McGregor is a British physiotherapist and biomedical engineer who is a professor at Imperial College London. Her research is focused on the musculoskeletal system and the mechanisms/impacts of injury. She has previously served as the President and Secretary of the Society for Back Pain Research.

== Early life and education ==
McGregor studied physiotherapy at King's College London. She graduated with a diploma in physiotherapy in 1989, then moved to the University of Surrey for her graduate studies. Her doctorate in bioengineering concentrated on human biomechanics.

== Research and career ==
In 1997, McGregor started working at Imperial College London, where she started to study back pain. She is a leading member of the MSk Lab, where she develops better diagnostic tools, surgical interventions and understanding of human movement on the musculoskeletal system. She has previously served as the President and Secretary of the Society for Back Pain Research.

McGregor joined an interdisciplinary research team providing physiotherapy to the rowers of Imperial's Boat Club. In particular, McGregor was interested in identifying the ideal technique that could minimise the risk of injury. Through the Imperial College Boat Club, McGregor became involved with British International Rowing. She has shown that the hip position is critical for rowing, and that a slumped position can limit transfer of power.

In 2012, McGregor and two students were chosen as Imperial College London Olympic flame torchbearers in the build-up to the London Olympic Games. She was selected because of her contributions to the Imperial Boat Club. In 2017, the Imperial College Boat Club recognised her twenty-year dedication to the club with an honorary party, where they named a boat after her.

== Personal life ==
McGregor is interested in sports and photography.

== Selected publications ==
- Simon P Rowland; James Edward Fitzgerald; Thomas Holme; John Powell; Alison McGregor (2020). "What is the clinical value of mHealth for patients?". npj Digital Medicine. 3: 4. doi:10.1038/s41746-019-0206-x. PMC 6957674. PMID 31970289. Wikidata Q92863721.
- J. H M. Bergmann; A. H. McGregor (2011). "Body-worn sensor design: what do patients and clinicians want?" (PDF). Annals of Biomedical Engineering. 39 (9): 2299–2312. doi:10.1007/s10439-011-0339-9. PMID 21674260. Wikidata Q37889717.
- Yewande Adesida; Enrica Papi; Alison H McGregor (2019). "Exploring the Role of Wearable Technology in Sport Kinematics and Kinetics: A Systematic Review". Sensors. 19 (7): 1597. doi:10.3390/s19071597. PMC 6480145. PMID 30987014. Wikidata Q64087279.
