= Maria Helena Diniz =

Brazilian jurist and professor

- Born: June 1, 1956 (age 69); São Paulo, Brazil

Philosophical work
- School: Pontifical Catholic University of São Paulo
- Main interests: Law, politics, philosophy, education
- Notable ideas: super-effectives constitutionals norms

Maria Helena Diniz (born 1956, São Paulo) is a Brazilian jurist and professor. She currently holds the chair of full professor of Civil Law at the Pontifical Catholic University of São Paulo, where she obtained her master's (1974) and doctorate (1976) degrees. She is the author of more than forty books and articles in the field of law, mainly in the civil area.

In constitutional law, Maria Helena Diniz proposes a new classification, based on intangibility and the production of concrete effects. Thus, it divides them into constitutional norms of absolute, full, restrictable relative and complementable relative (or complementation-dependent) effectiveness.

== Published books and works ==
Main published works

- Brazilian Civil Law Course - General Theory of Civil Law
- Brazilian Civil Law Course - General Theory of Obligations
- The Gaps in Law
- Compendium of introduction to the science of law
- Concept of Legal Norm as an Essential Problem
- 1988 Constitution: Legitimacy, Effectiveness, Effectiveness and Supremacy

Known for her rigid work in describing her works, the best known being the Civil Law Course, she is always recommended for the best interpretation of the Course, her important work "Dicionario Juridico Universitário". Both works are issued by Saraiva publishing house.

== See also ==
- Philosophy of law
