= K. N. Ninan =

Indian economist

K.N. Ninan
- Born: 31 August 1950 (age 76); Nairobi, Kenya
- Spouse: Anne Ninan

Academic background
- Education: University of Kerala (B.A, M.A.); University of Mysore (PhD)
- Awards: National Merit Scholarship (1967 - 1972); University Merit Scholarship

Karachepone N. Ninan (born 31 August 1950) is an ecological economist. He is chairperson of the Centre for Economics, Environment and Society in Bengaluru and a lead author of the United Nations Environment Programme's Global Environment Outlook 7 report.

== Early life and education ==
Ninan was born in Nairobi, Kenya, and later moved to India, where he continued his education. Ninan obtained his bachelor's degree in economics, Political Science and Indian History from the University of Kerala in 1972 and master's degree in economics from the University of Kerala in 1974.

He was awarded a PhD fellowship by the Institute for Social and Economic Change, Bangalore and obtained Ph.D. in economics from the University of Mysore in 1984. He also attended an International Summer School in Development Economics and Mathematics for Economists at the London School of Economics during June–August 1992.

== Career ==
Dr. Ninan joined the Institute for Social and Economic Change (ISEC), Bangalore in 1978 where he held several research and faculty positions between 1978 and 2012. He became Professor of Ecological Economics in 2006 and held this position until August 2012. He was also Head of the Centre for Ecological Economics and Natural Resources in the same institute. In February 2013, along with two colleagues, he founded the Centre for Economics, Environment and Society (CEES), a non-profit organisation in Bangalore working in the interface of development and environment and has been its chairperson and Honorary Professor since then.

== Awards and honours ==
Dr Ninan has had a distinguished professional career. He was invited as visiting professor at several international Universities and Institutions where he taught and/or conducted research in ecological/environmental economics especially on the economics and valuation of biodiversity and ecosystem services, sustainable use and management of forest and water resources, and climate economics. These include: University of Versailles, France (1 March to 30 April 2000); University of Tokyo (1 October 2004 – 30 September 2005; 5 January 2015 - 30 June 2015); University of California, Donald Bren School of Environmental Science and Management, Santa Barbara, USA (1 September - 31 December 2008); University of Cambridge, UK (1 March 2014 to 31 March 2014); and ICCR Chair Professor at the University of Gothenburg, Sweden (Spring Semester: 6 March 2016 to 16 June 2016).

He has received numerous awards and fellowships. These include: National Merit Scholarship (1967 - 1972); University Merit Scholarship (1972 - 1974). He was awarded Visiting Fellowships of: British Council Visitor to CSERGE, University College London and London School of Economics (May 1992); Institute of Developing Economies, Tokyo (June–December 1995); Institute of Development Studies, University of Sussex, UK (April 1998 - June 1998); Indo-French Exchange Fellowship at Maison Des Sciences De L’Homme, Paris (October 2000); Japan Foundation Research Fellowship at University of Tokushima and University of Tokyo (January 2001 - June 2001), and Japan Society for Promotion of Science (JSPS) Long Term Invitation Fellowship at University of Tokyo (1 April 2010 – 31 January 2011). He was appointed as a Senior Fellow in the World Resources Institute, New Delhi (from 15 December 2020)

== Research ==
Dr Ninan's research has focused on understanding the economics and institutional aspects of biodiversity conservation in the tropical forests of the Western Ghats biodiversity hotspot in Southern India which is one of the thirty-five biodiversity hotspots in the world. His work among the local communities of the tropical forests of the Western Ghats biodiversity hotspot is noteworthy. Besides economics and valuation of biodiversity and forest ecosystem services Dr. Ninan's research has focused on sustainable use and management of forest and water resources; sustainable agriculture; impact assessment of watershed and community forestry projects; climate resilience, adaptation and climate change impacts; and poverty studies.

== Publications ==
He has published about 14 books and 70 papers on these topics. His books include:

- Ninan, K. N., ed. (2020). Environmental Assessments. doi:10.4337/9781788976879. ISBN 978-1-78897-687-9.
- Economic Valuation of Tiger Reserves in India: A Value+ Approach, Indian Institute of Forest Management (IIFM), Bhopal and National Tiger Conservation Authority (NTCA), Phase 2, July 2019. (co-author)
- Building a Climate Resilient Economy and Society-Challenges and Opportunities (Edward Elgar, Cheltenham and Northampton, 2017, foreword by Sir Robert T. Watson)
- The Methodological Assessment Report on Scenarios and Models of Biodiversity and Ecosystem Services, Intergovernmental Platform on Biodiversity and Ecosystem Services (IPBES), United Nations, Bonn, Germany, 2016.
- Ninan, K. N., ed. (2014). Valuing Ecosystem Services. doi:10.4337/9781781955161. ISBN 978-1-78195-516-1.
- Ninan, K. N., ed. (2012). Conserving and Valuing Ecosystem Services and Biodiversity. doi:10.4324/9781849770859. ISBN 978-1-136-56911-1.
- The Economics of Biodiversity Conservation- Valuation in Tropical Forest Ecosystem Services (Earthscan, London and Washington, 2007, Reprints in 2008 and 2012; Paperback in 2016; foreword by Charles Perrings)
- Forest Use and Management in Japan and India-A Comparative Study (Institute of Developing Economies, Tokyo, 1996)

He has published papers in top rated journals such as:

- Pereira, Laura M.; Davies, Kathryn K.; den Belder, Eefje; Ferrier, Simon; Karlsson-Vinkhuyzen, Sylvia; Kim, HyeJin; Kuiper, Jan J.; Okayasu, Sana; Palomo, Maria G.; Pereira, Henrique M.; Peterson, Garry; Sathyapalan, Jyothis; Schoolenberg, Machteld; Alkemade, Rob; Carvalho Ribeiro, Sonia; Greenaway, Alison; Hauck, Jennifer; King, Nicholas; Lazarova, Tanya; Ravera, Federica; Chettri, Nakul; Cheung, William W. L.; Hendriks, Rob J. J.; Kolomytsev, Grigoriy; Leadley, Paul; Metzger, Jean-Paul; Ninan, Karachepone N.; Pichs, Ramon; Popp, Alexander; Rondinini, Carlo; Rosa, Isabel; van Vuuren, Detlef; Lundquist, Carolyn J. (December 2020). "Developing multiscale and integrative nature–people scenarios using the Nature Futures Framework". People and Nature. 2 (4): 1172–1195. Bibcode:2020PeoNa...2.1172P. doi:10.1002/pan3.10146. hdl:11573/1444736.
- Ninan, K N (11 January 2019). "Climate Change and Rural Poverty Levels in India". Economic and Political Weekly. 54 (2).
- Rosa, Isabel M. D.; Pereira, Henrique M.; Ferrier, Simon; Alkemade, Rob; Acosta, Lilibeth A.; Akcakaya, H. Resit; den Belder, Eefje; Fazel, Asghar M.; Fujimori, Shinichiro; Harfoot, Mike; Harhash, Khaled A.; Harrison, Paula A.; Hauck, Jennifer; Hendriks, Rob J. J.; Hernández, Gladys; Jetz, Walter; Karlsson-Vinkhuyzen, Sylvia I.; Kim, HyeJin; King, Nicholas; Kok, Marcel T. J.; Kolomytsev, Grygoriy O.; Lazarova, Tanya; Leadley, Paul; Lundquist, Carolyn J.; García Márquez, Jaime; Meyer, Carsten; Navarro, Laetitia M.; Nesshöver, Carsten; Ngo, Hien T.; Ninan, Karachepone N.; Palomo, Maria G.; Pereira, Laura M.; Peterson, Garry D.; Pichs, Ramon; Popp, Alexander; Purvis, Andy; Ravera, Federica; Rondinini, Carlo; Sathyapalan, Jyothis; Schipper, Aafke M.; Seppelt, Ralf; Settele, Josef; Sitas, Nadia; van Vuuren, Detlef (21 September 2017). "Multiscale scenarios for nature futures". Nature Ecology & Evolution. 1 (10): 1416–1419. Bibcode:2017NatEE...1.1416R. doi:10.1038/s41559-017-0273-9. hdl:1874/357274. PMID 29185524.
- Ninan, K.N.; Inoue, Makoto (September 2013). "Valuing forest ecosystem services: What we know and what we don't". Ecological Economics. 93: 137–149. Bibcode:2013EcoEc..93..137N. doi:10.1016/j.ecolecon.2013.05.005.
- Ninan, K.N.; Inoue, Makoto (September 2013). "Valuing forest ecosystem services: Case study of a forest reserve in Japan". Ecosystem Services. 5: 78–87. Bibcode:2013EcoSv...5...78N. doi:10.1016/j.ecoser.2013.02.006.
- Recognising the Value of Biodiversity- New Approaches to Policy Assessment, chapter 4 in Patrick ten Brink (ed.), The TEEB Report for National and Policy Making (Earthscan, 2011)
- Ninan, K.N.; Sathyapalan, Jyothis (October 2005). "The economics of biodiversity conservation: a study of a coffee growing region in the Western Ghats of India". Ecological Economics. 55 (1): 61–72. Bibcode:2005EcoEc..55...61N. doi:10.1016/j.ecolecon.2004.10.005.
- Panda, Architesh; Sharma, Upasna; Ninan, K.N.; Patt, Anthony (August 2013). "Adaptive capacity contributing to improved agricultural productivity at the household level: Empirical findings highlighting the importance of crop insurance". Global Environmental Change. 23 (4): 782–790. Bibcode:2013GEC....23..782P. doi:10.1016/j.gloenvcha.2013.03.002.
- Bhattacharya, Poulomi; Ninan, K. N. (November 2011). "Social cost-benefit analysis of intensive versus traditional shrimp farming: A case study from India: Social cost-benefit analysis of intensive versus traditional shrimp farming: A case study from India". Natural Resources Forum. 35 (4): 321–333. doi:10.1111/j.1477-8947.2011.01385.x.
- Ninan, K. N.; Lakshmikanthamma, S. (December 1994). "Sustainable development: the case of watershed development in India". International Journal of Sustainable Development & World Ecology. 1 (4): 229–238. Bibcode:1994IJSDW...1..229N. doi:10.1080/13504509409469878.

His articles in newspapers/weeklies include the following:

- COVID-19 vaccines: politics, nationalism and diplomacy (Mainstream Weekly, New Delhi, 20 February 2021).
- US presidential elections: Abki Baar Biden Sarkar (Mainstream Weekly, New Delhi, 2 January 2021).
- Match fixing in academic institutions (Mainstream Weekly, New Delhi, 26 December 2020).
- What previous PMs did (Deccan Herald, Bangalore, 8 November 2020)
- New farm laws: for farmers or corporates (Mainstream Weekly, 7 November 2020).
- Draft EIA 2020: Inviting pandemics, disasters (Deccan Herald, Bangalore, 7 August 2020).
- In light of COVID-19: Kerala model vs Gujarat model (Deccan Herald, Bangalore, 9 July 2020).
- COVID-19: building resilience to pandemics (Mainstream Weekly, New Delhi, 27 June 2020).
- India's forests are thriving-on paper (Deccan Herald, Bangalore, 5 March 2020).
- Ease of doing business in India-myths and realities (Deccan Herald, Bangalore, 13 January 2020).
- Extreme events and disasters: building resilience is key (Deccan Herald, Bangalore, 17 August 2018).
- Hunger amidst prosperity: of what use is fast growth (Deccan Herald, Bangalore, 29 October 2018).
- The vulnerable sidelined (Deccan Herald, Bangalore, 6 July 2018).
- Can India survive without black money (Deccan Herald, Bangalore, 4 September 2017).

== Recognition ==
In recognition of his outstanding contribution to scientific knowledge and understanding about the economics of biodiversity conservation and valuation of forest ecosystem services, Dr Ninan was nominated as Co-chair of a global assessment with over eighty scientists and experts from around the world to prepare a Methodological Assessment Report on Scenarios and Models of Biodiversity and Ecosystem Services by the Intergovernmental Science-Policy Platform on Biodiversity and Ecosystem Services (IPBES) in 2014. Dr. Ninan was also part of the Phase 2 team of this IPBES deliverable (2016–2019) that was tasked with developing an evolving guide for policy makers on the use of scenarios and models of biodiversity and ecosystem services, and develop scenarios suited for IPBES. Dr Ninan was also Contributing Author to UNEP's TEEB Report on National and International Policy Making (2011).

He was recently invited as Lead Author for Working Group III contribution to the Sixth Assessment Report of the Intergovernmental Panel on Climate Change (IPCC). Dr Ninan's expertise in biodiversity and ecosystem services valuation and climate economics has also been sought by the Indian Ministry of Environment, Forests and Climate Change (MoEFCC). He was selected as an expert member of study teams constituted by the Indian Ministry of Environment, Forests and Climate Change (MoEFCC) to advise the government on biodiversity and ecosystem services and prepare India's response to the Durban Platform on Climate Change. In 2016 he was elected as the Vice President of the Indian Society for Ecological Economics (INSEE) which is the regional chapter of the International Society for Ecological Economics (ISEE). In 2018 he was elected as President of INSEE for the period 2018–2020. In 2020 he was honoured and conferred the title of Honorary INSEE Fellow by the Indian Society for Ecological Economics.
