= Masarh lion =

Stone sculpture found in India

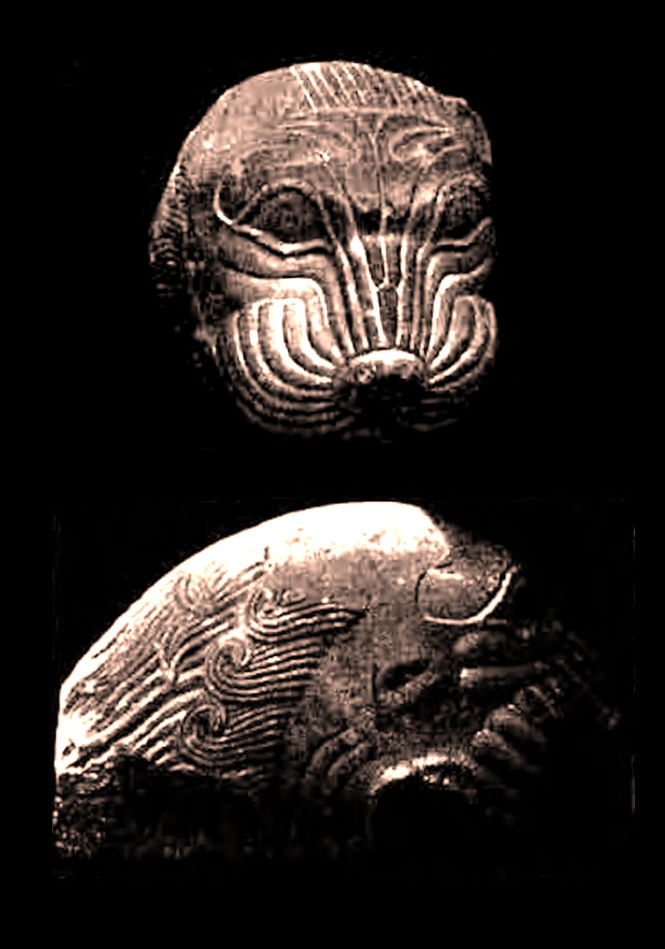
- The Masarh lion, in the Patna Museum. For a recent photograph

- Location within India Location within Bihar
- 25.5578°N 84.5780°E
- Location: Arrah, Bhojpur, Bihar, India

The Masarh lion is a stone sculpture found at Masarh, a village near Arrah town in the Bhojpur district of the Indian state of Bihar. This sculpture is generally dated to the 3rd century BC.

== Description ==
The lion is carved out of Chunar sandstone, similar to the Pillars of Ashoka, and has a polished finish, a feature associated with Maurya sculpture. The sculptural style is Achaemenid. This is particularly the case for the well-ordered tubular representation of whiskers (vibrissae) and the geometrical representation of inflated veins that cover the face. The mane, with tufts of hair represented in wavelets, is classically represented.

According to archaeologist S.P. Gupta, these visual features can be described as non-Indian. Similar examples are known in Greece and Persepolis. It is possible that this sculpture was made by an Achaemenid or Greek sculptor in India and either remained without effect, or was the Indian imitation of a Greek or Achaemenid model, somewhere between the 5th century BC and the 1st century BC. However, it is generally dated from the time of the Maurya Empire, around the 3rd century BC.

Achaemenid examples

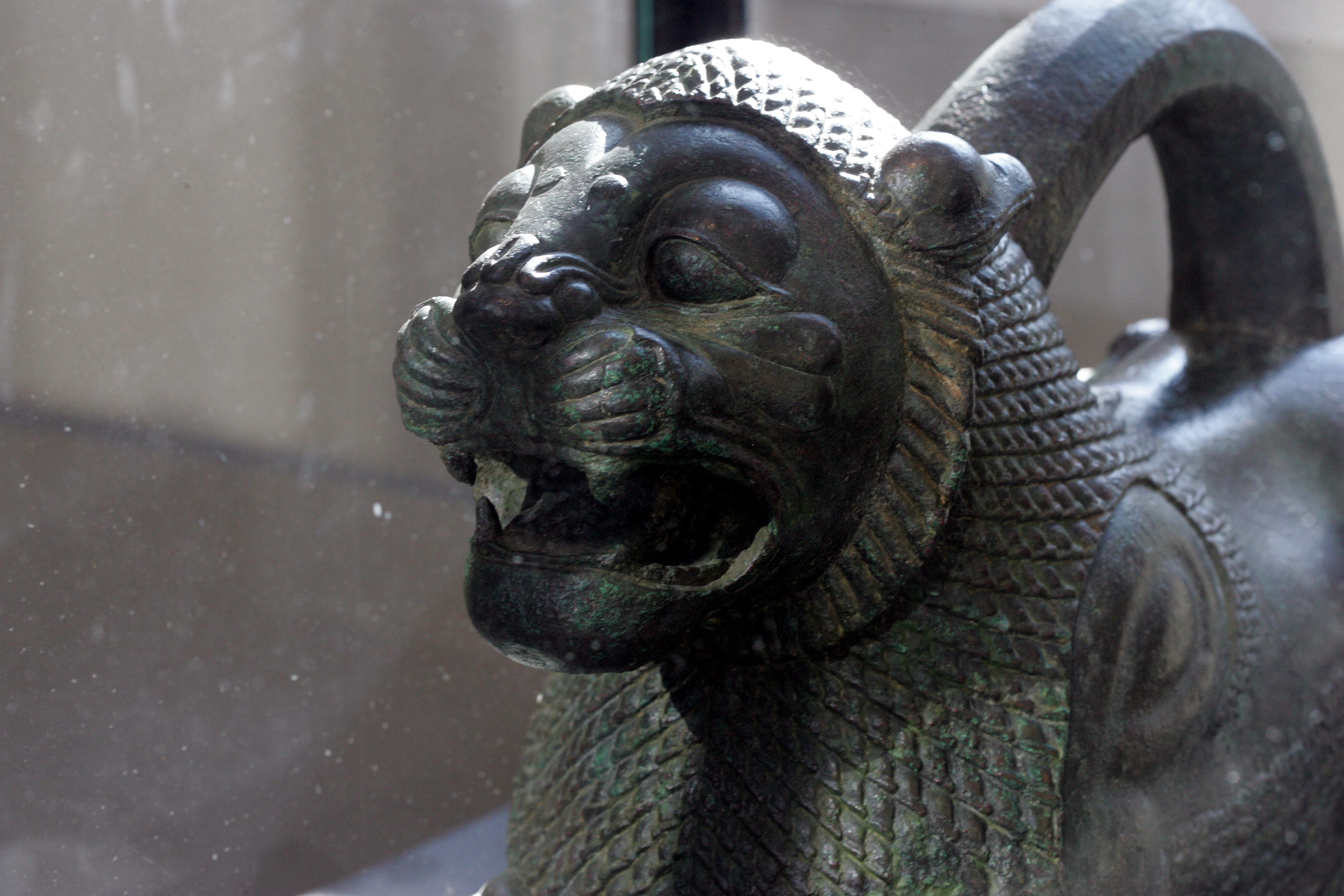
Achaemenid lion.

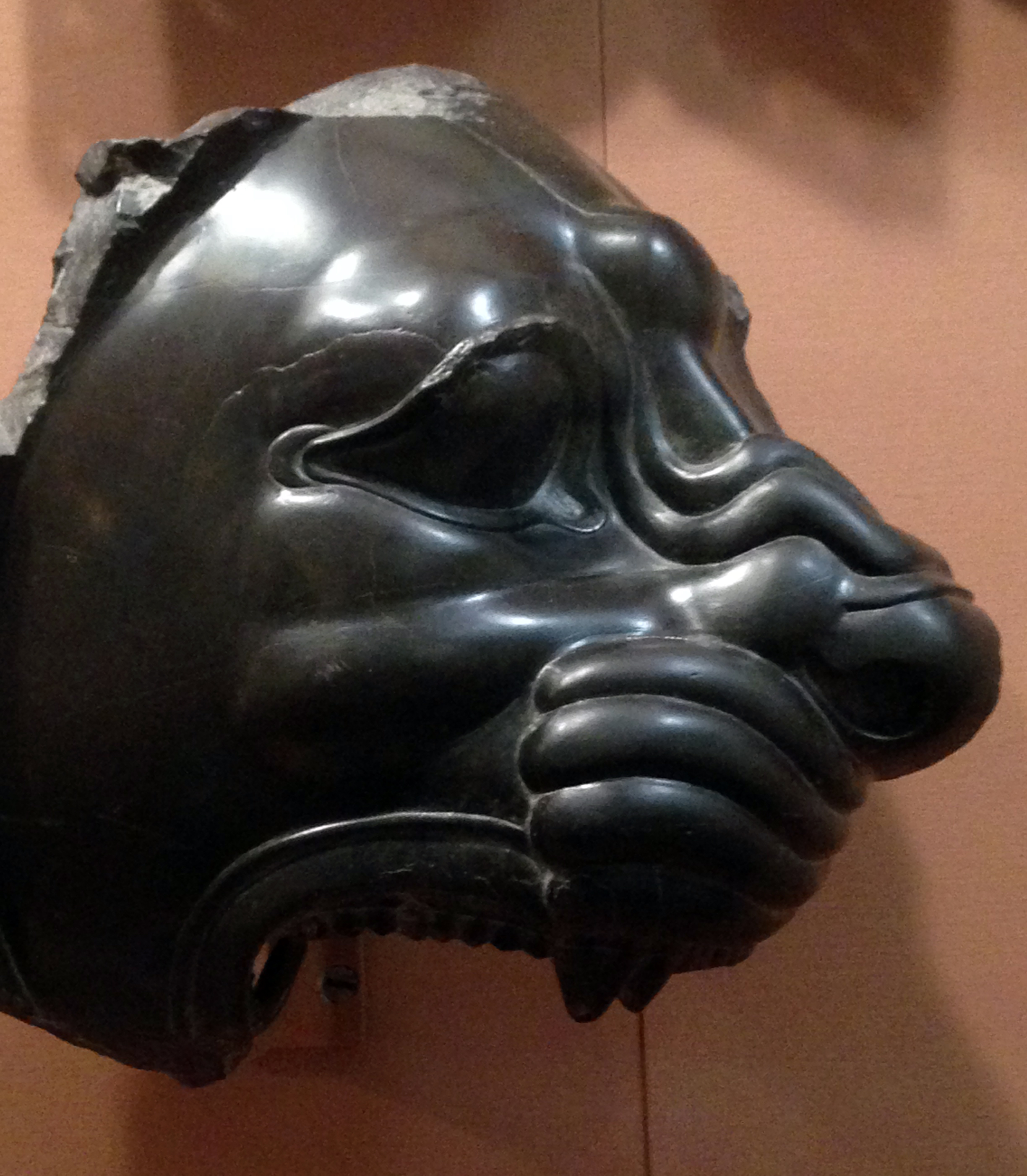
Achaemenid lion.

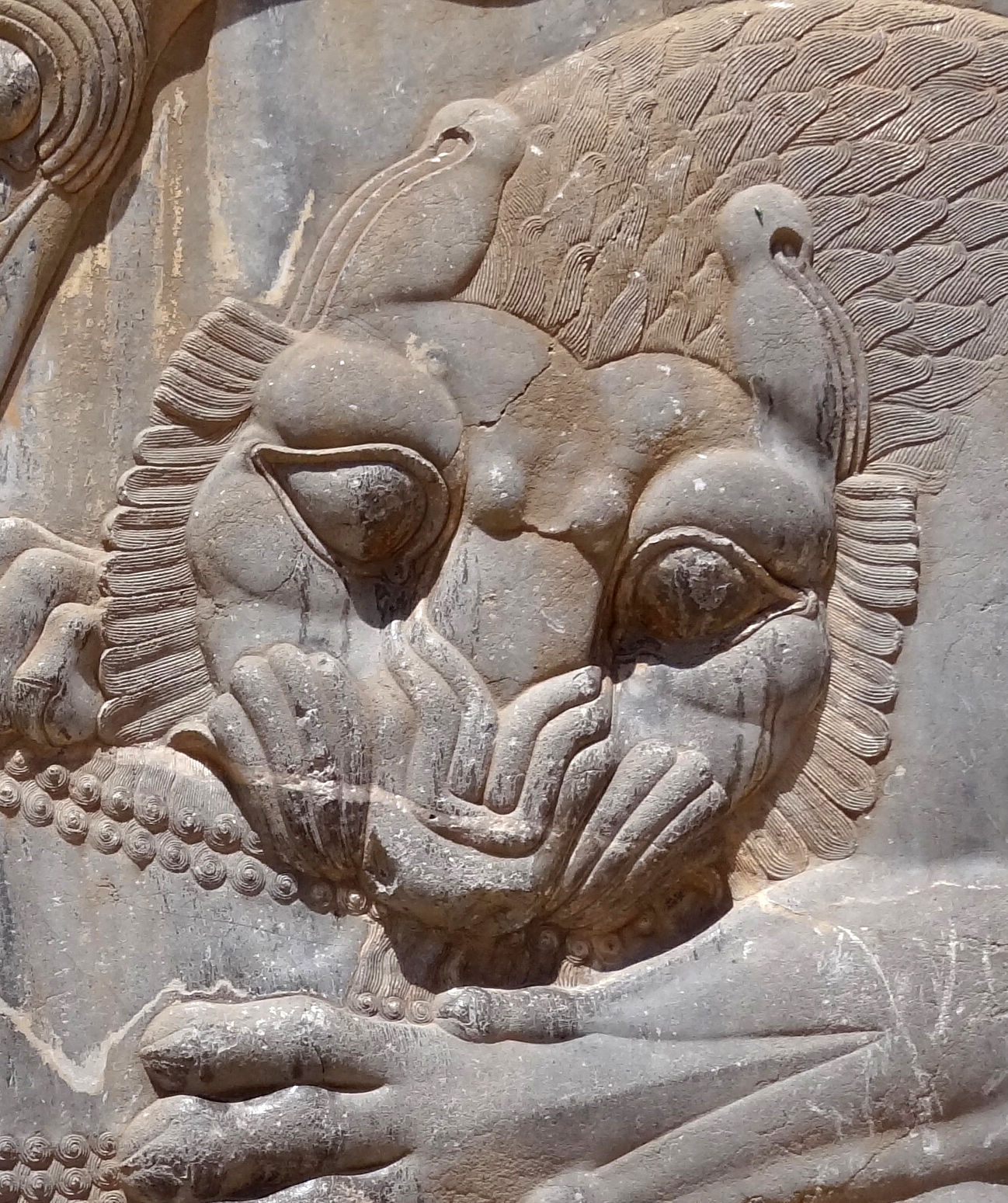
Bas-relief of an Achaemenid lion

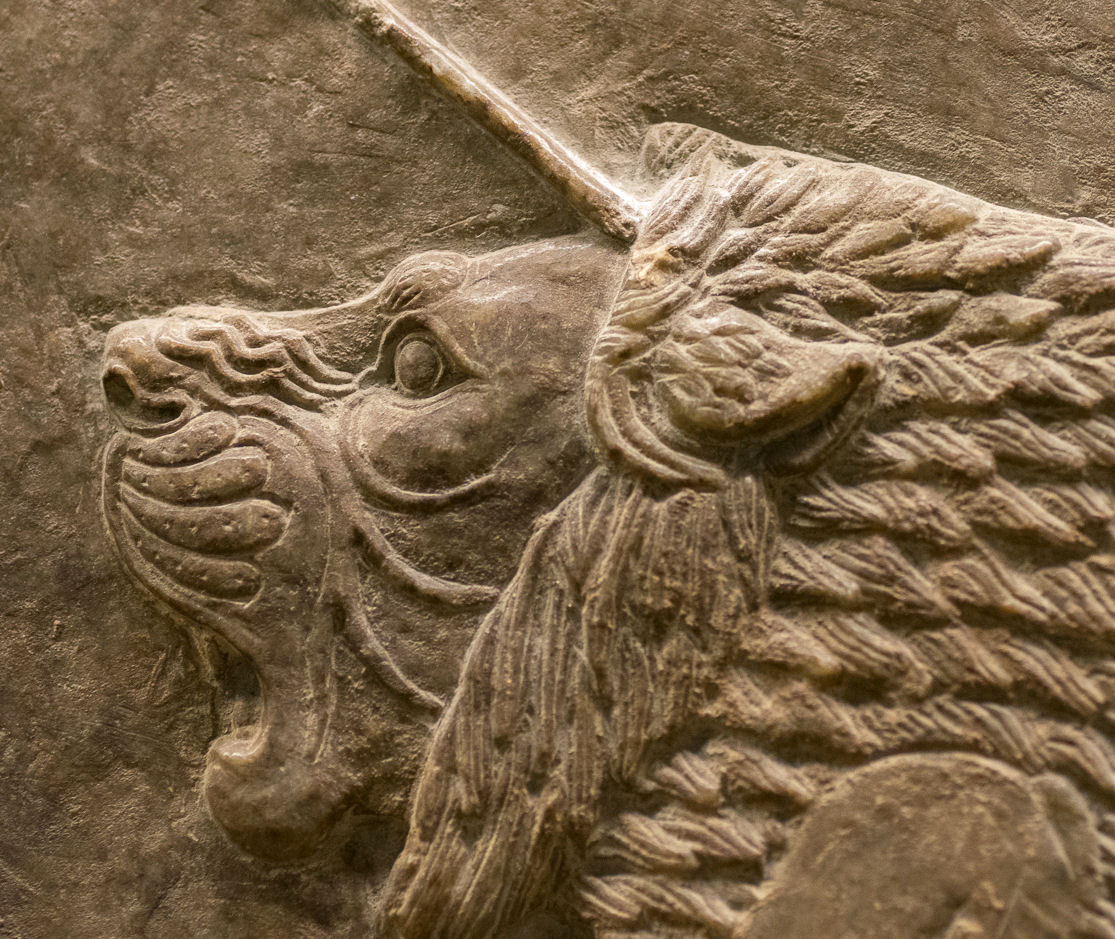
Lion of Nineveh.

Greek examples

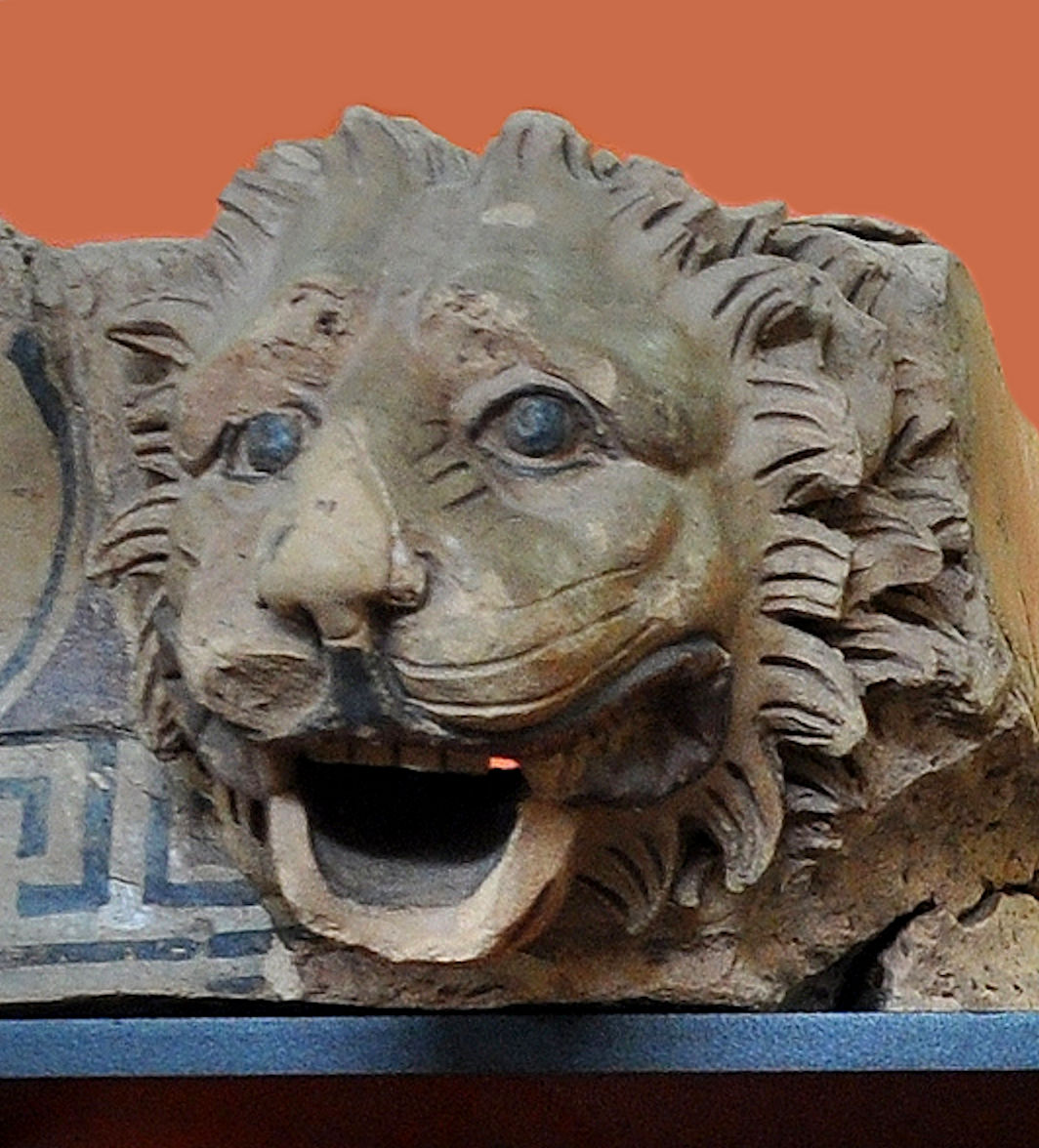
Terracotta lion of Delphi, 5th century BC

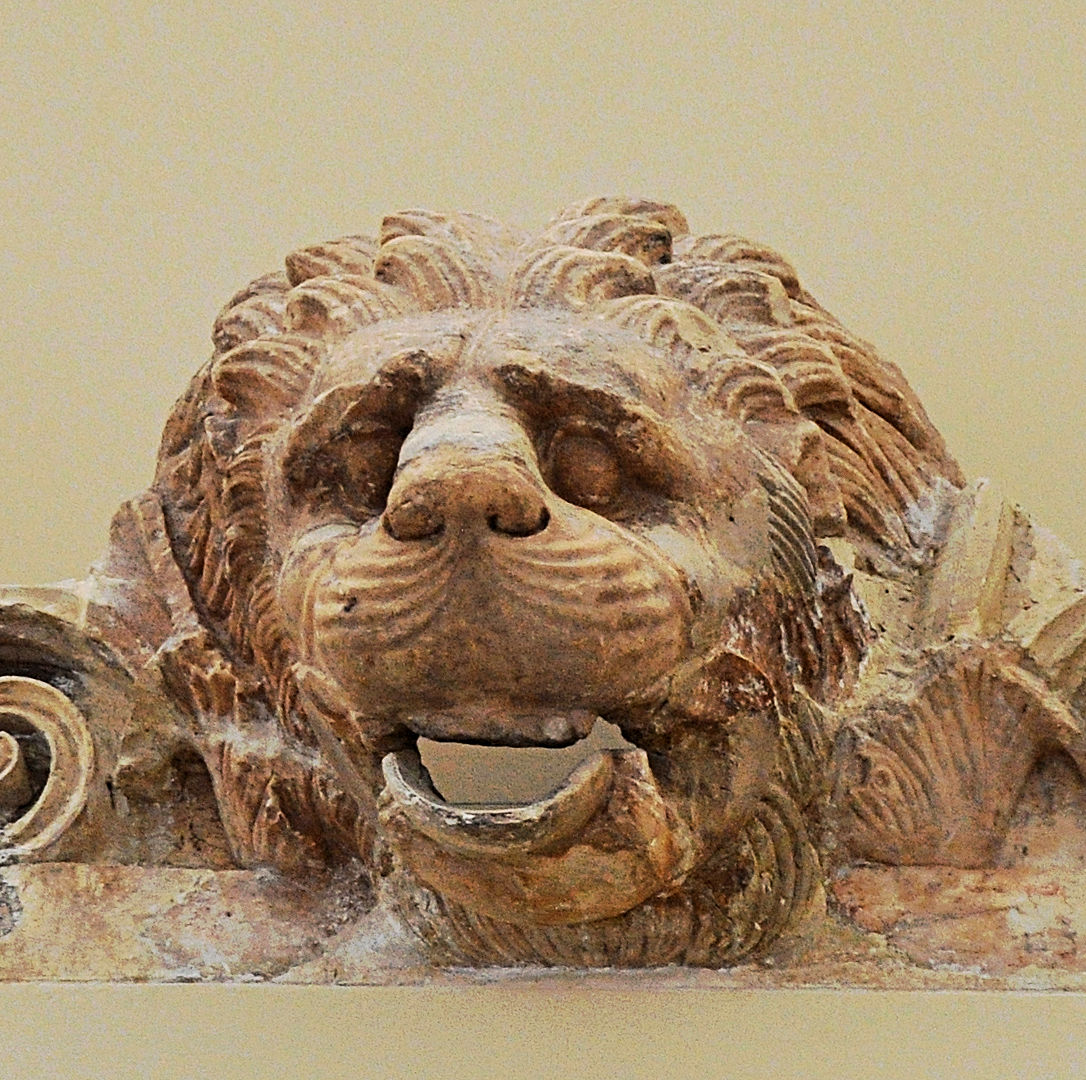
Greek Lion, Temple of Apollo, Delphi

== Later developments ==
According to John Boardman, the sculpture is "quite Persian", although the treatment of the mane is of Greek naturalistic style and breaks with the rigid and codified style of the Achaemenid Empire. The Lion Capital of Ashoka from Sarnath represents the next logical step in the art, and would be the realisation of Greek Hellenistic artists to soften and give more naturalness to the Persian style.

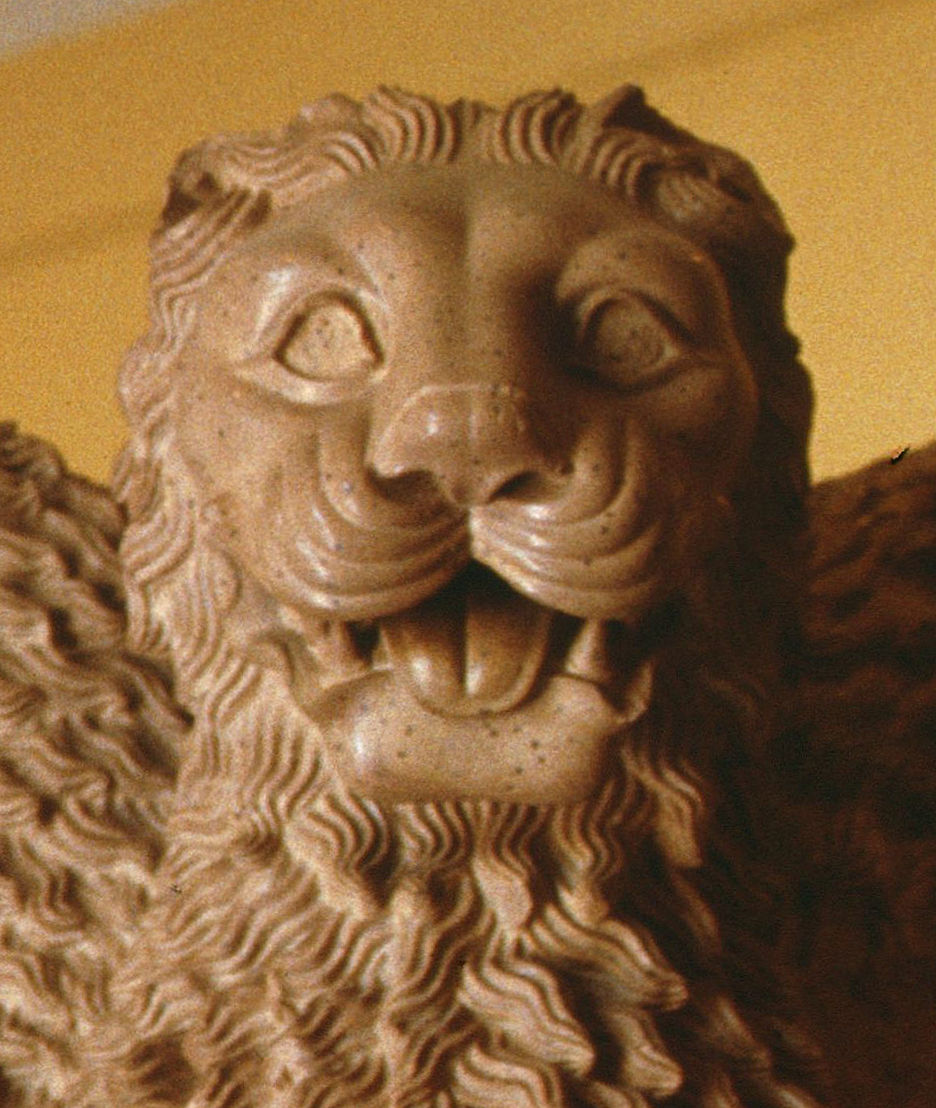
Detail of the Lion Capital of Ashoka from Sarnath, 3rd century BC

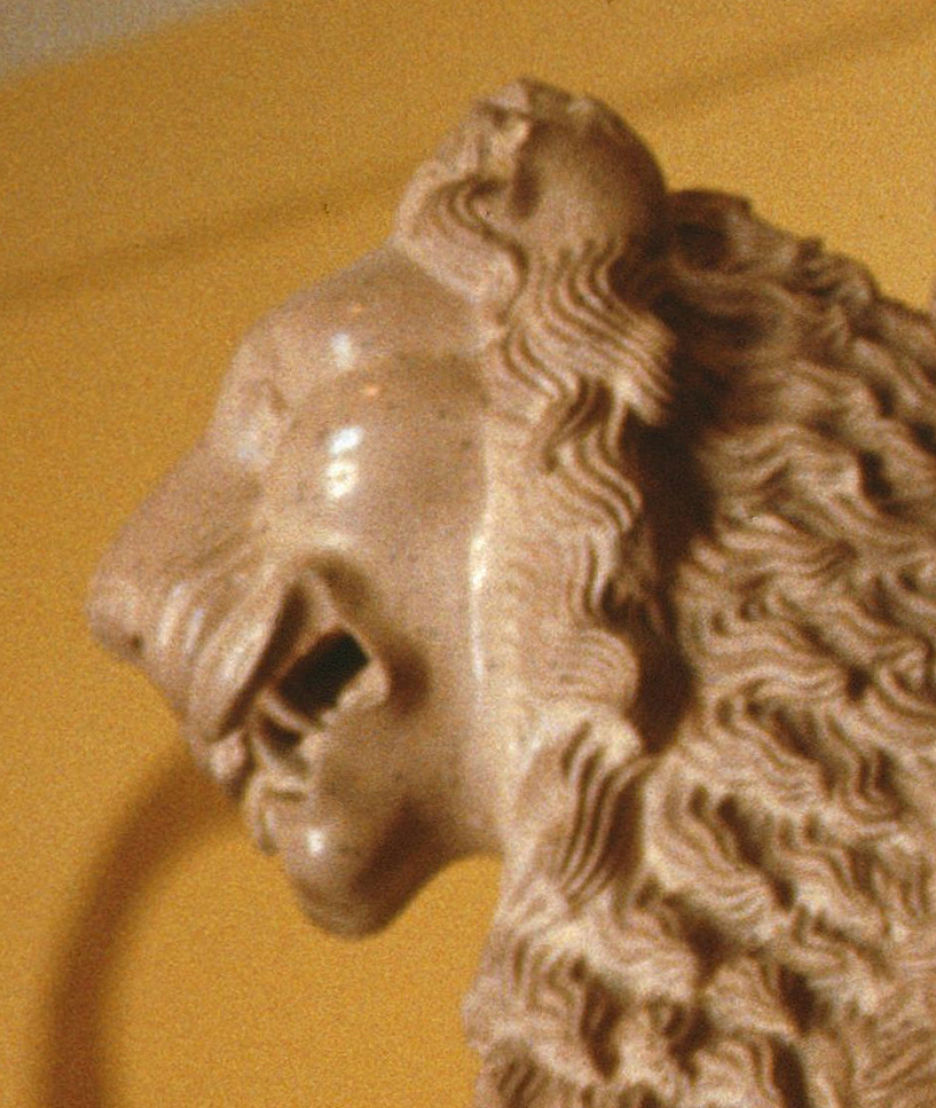
Profile of one of the Sarnath lions

== Other examples of stylistic influence ==
Other examples include the Pataliputra capital, the Hellenistic friezes of the Rampurva capitals and Sankissa, and the diamond throne of Bodh Gaya.

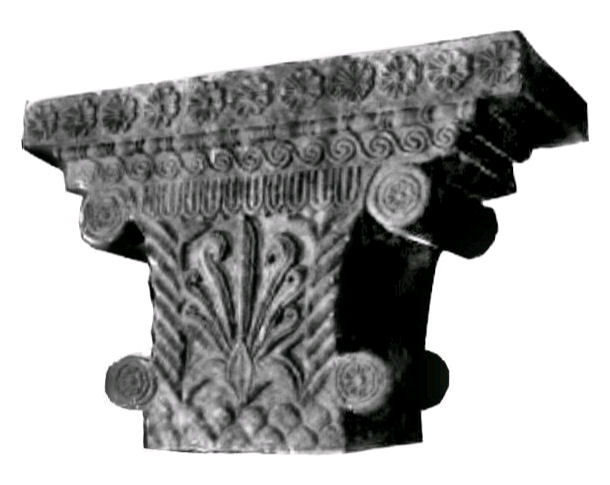
Pataliputra capital

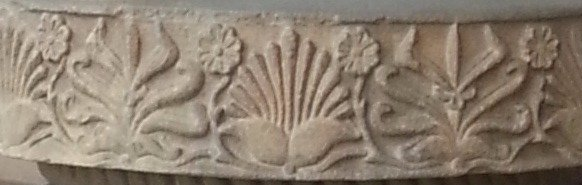
Frieze of Rampurva capitals, alternating palmettes and lotus

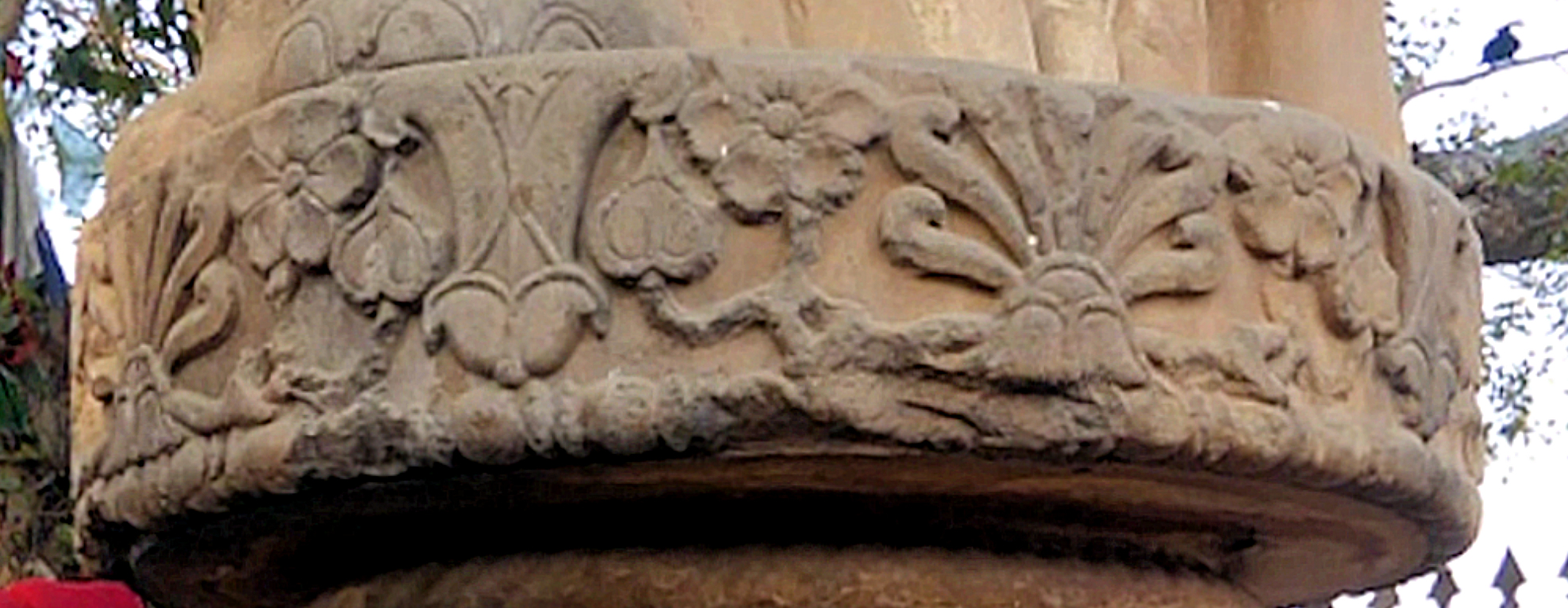
Frieze of Sankissa

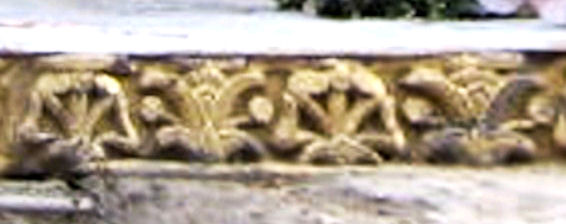
Frieze of the diamond throne of Bodh Gaya

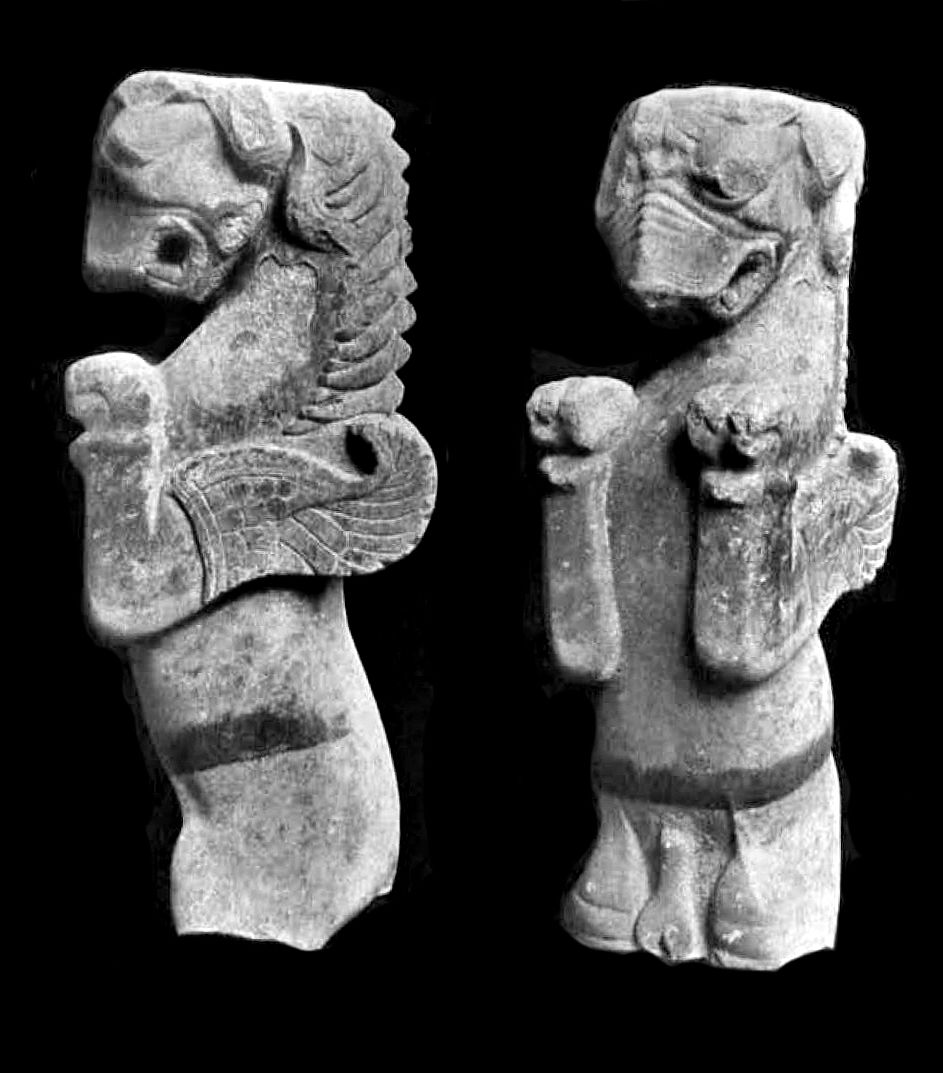
Griffin of Pataliputra

== See also ==
- Hellenistic influence on Indian art
