= Mauryan art =

Art produced during the Mauryan Empire

Mauryan art

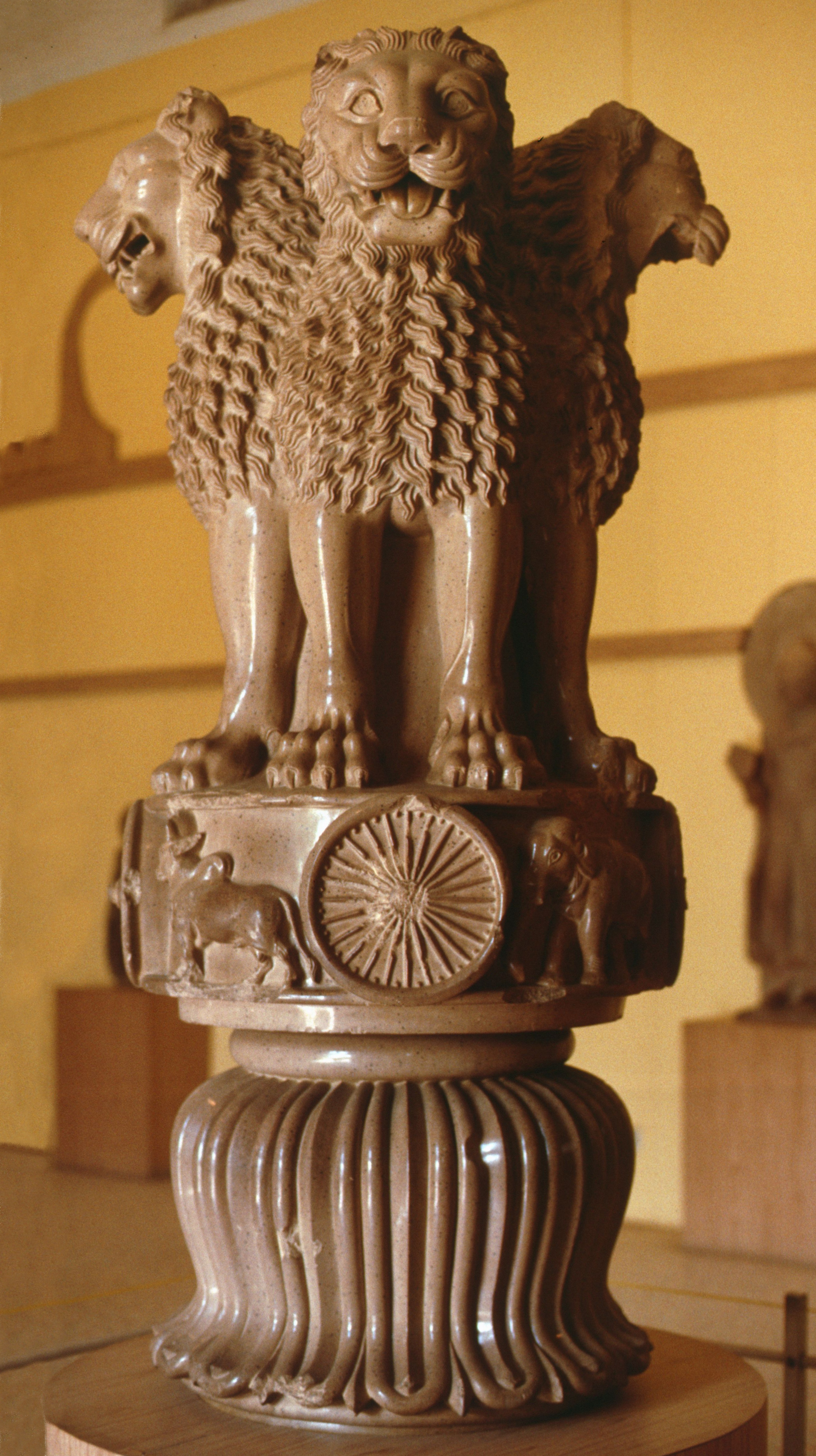
The Lion Capital of Ashoka, National Emblem of India, the most famous example of Mauryan art

Mauryan art is art produced during the period of the Maurya Empire, the first empire to rule over most of the Indian subcontinent, between 322 and 185 BCE. It represented an important transition in Indian art from the use of wood to stone. It was a royal art patronized by Mauryan emperors, most notably Ashoka. Pillars, stupas and caves are its most prominent surviving examples.

The most significant remains of monumental Mauryan art include those of the royal palace and the city of Pataliputra, a monolithic rail at Sarnath, the Bodhimaṇḍa or the altar resting on four pillars at Bodh Gaya, the rock-cut chaitya-halls in the Barabar Caves near Gaya (including the Sudama cave bearing the inscription dated the 12th regnal year of Ashoka), the non-edict-bearing and edict-bearing pillars, the animal sculptures crowning the pillars with animal and vegetal reliefs decorating the abaci of the capitals, and the front half of the representation of an elephant carved in the round from a live rock at Dhauli.

Ananda Coomaraswamy, writing in 1923, argued that the Mauryan art had three main phases. The first phase is found in some instances of the representation of the Vedic deities (the most significant examples are the reliefs of Surya and Indra at the Bhaja Caves). However the art of the Bhaja Caves is now generally dated later than the Mauryan period, to the 2nd-1st centuries BCE. The second phase was the court art of Ashoka, typically found in the monolithic columns on which his edicts are inscribed and the third phase was the beginning of brick and stone architecture, as in the case of the original stupa at Sanchi, the small monolithic rail at Sanchi, and the Lomas Rishi Cave in the Barabar Caves, with its ornamented facade, echoing the forms of wooden art.

Most scholars agree that Mauryan art was influenced by Greek and Persian art, especially in imperial sculpture and architecture. Political and cultural contacts between the Greek and Persian cultures and India were intensive and ran for a long period of time, encouraging the propagation of their advances in the area of sculpture.

== Sculpture ==
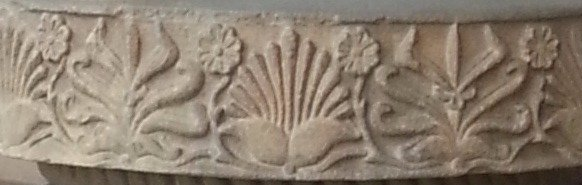
Rampurva bull capital, detail of the abacus, with two "flame palmettes" framing a lotus surrounded by small rosette flowers.

This period marked an imaginative and impressive step forward in Indian stone sculpture; much previous sculpture was probably in wood and has not survived. The elaborately carved animal capitals surviving on from some Pillars of Ashoka are the best known works, and among the finest, above all the Lion Capital of Ashoka from Sarnath that is now the National Emblem of India. Coomaraswamy distinguishes between court art and a more popular art during the Mauryan period. Court art is represented by the pillars and their capitals, and surviving popular art by some stone pieces, and many smaller works in terracotta.

The highly polished surface of court sculpture is often called Mauryan polish. However, this seems not to be entirely reliable as a diagnostic tool for a Mauryan date, as some works from considerably later periods also have it. The Didarganj Yakshi, now most often thought to be from the 2nd century CE, is an example.

=== Pillars and their capitals ===
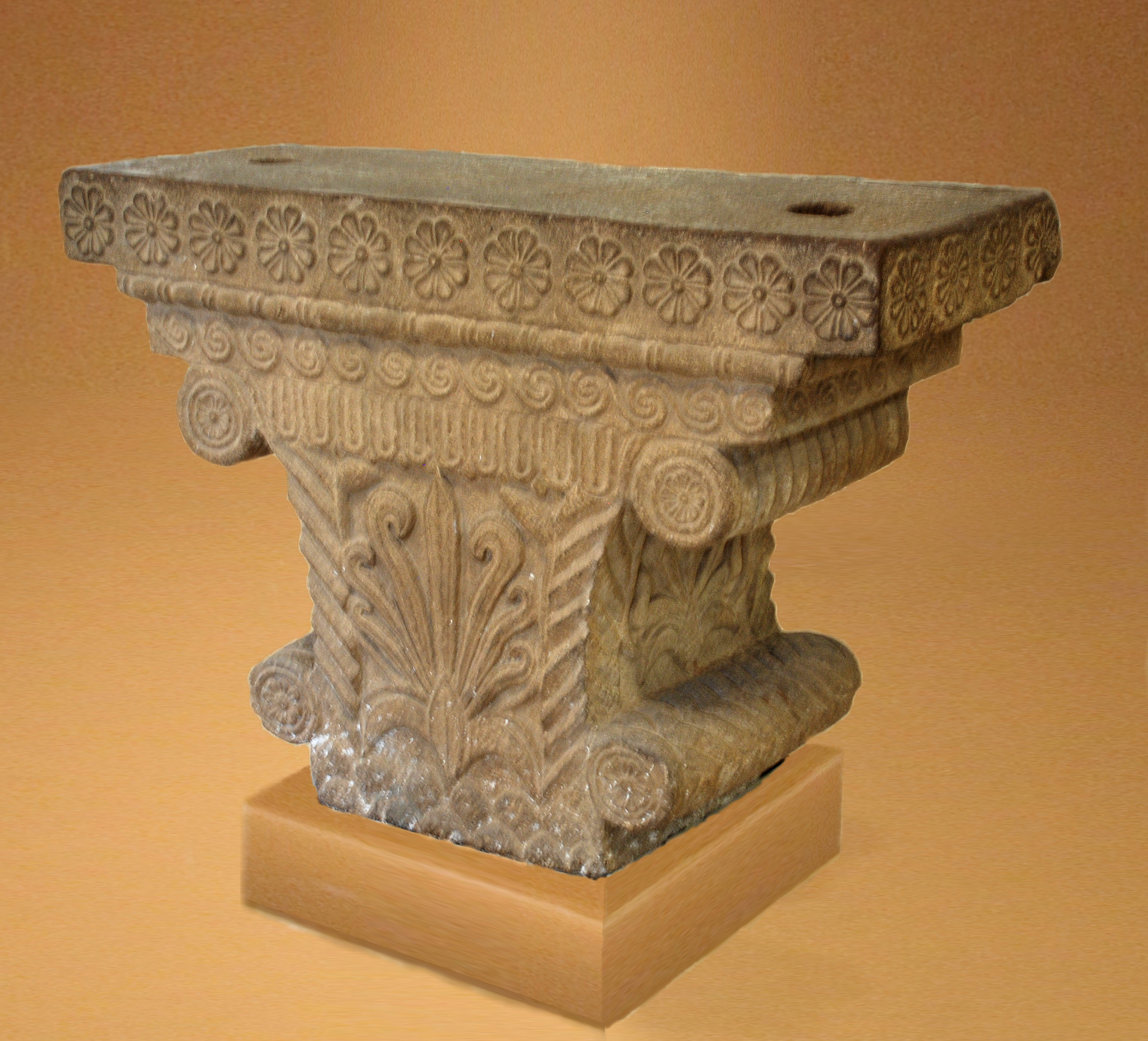
The Pataliputra capital, showing both Achaemenid and Greek influence, with volute, bead and reel, meander and honeysuckle designs. Early Mauryan period, 4th-3rd century BC.

The Pataliputra capital, dated to the 3rd century BCE, has been excavated at the Mauryan city of Pataliputra. It has been described as Perso-Ionic, with a strong Greek stylistic influence, including volute, bead and reel, meander or honeysuckle designs. This monumental piece of architecture tends to suggest the Achaemenid and Hellenistic artistic influence at the Mauryan court from early on.

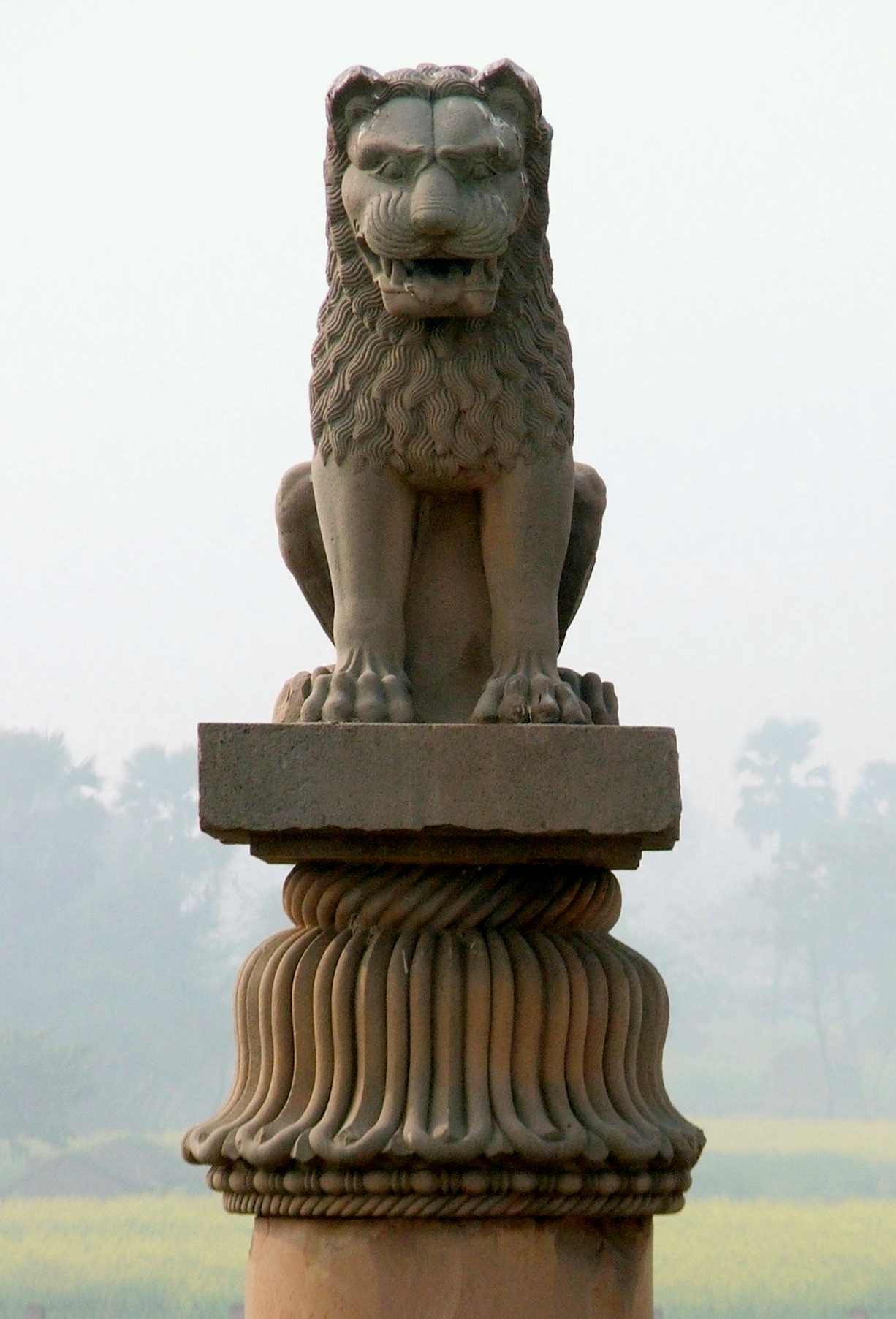
Single Lion capital at Vaishali

Emperor Ashoka also erected religious pillars throughout India. These pillars were carved in two types of stone. Some were of the spotted red and white sandstone from the region of Mathura, the others of buff-coloured fine grained hard sandstone usually with small black spots quarried in the Chunar near Varanasi. The uniformity of style in the pillar capitals suggests that they were all sculpted by craftsmen from the same region. It would therefore seem, that stone transported from Mathura and Chunar to the various sites where the pillars have been found and here the stone was cut and carved by craftsmen They were given a fine polish characteristic of Mauryan sculpture.

These pillars were mainly erected in the Gangetic plains. They were inscribed with edicts of Ashoka on Dhamma or righteousness. The animal capital as a finely carved lifelike representation, noteworthy are the lion capital of Sarnath, the bull capital of Rampurva and the lion capital of Lauria Nandangarh. Much speculation has been made about the similarity between these capitals and Achaemenid works.

=== "Popular" sculpture ===
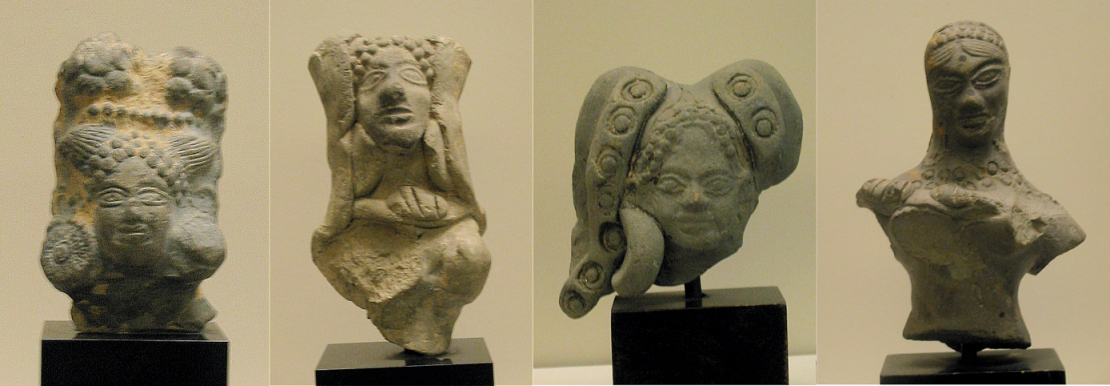
Statuettes of the Mauryan era

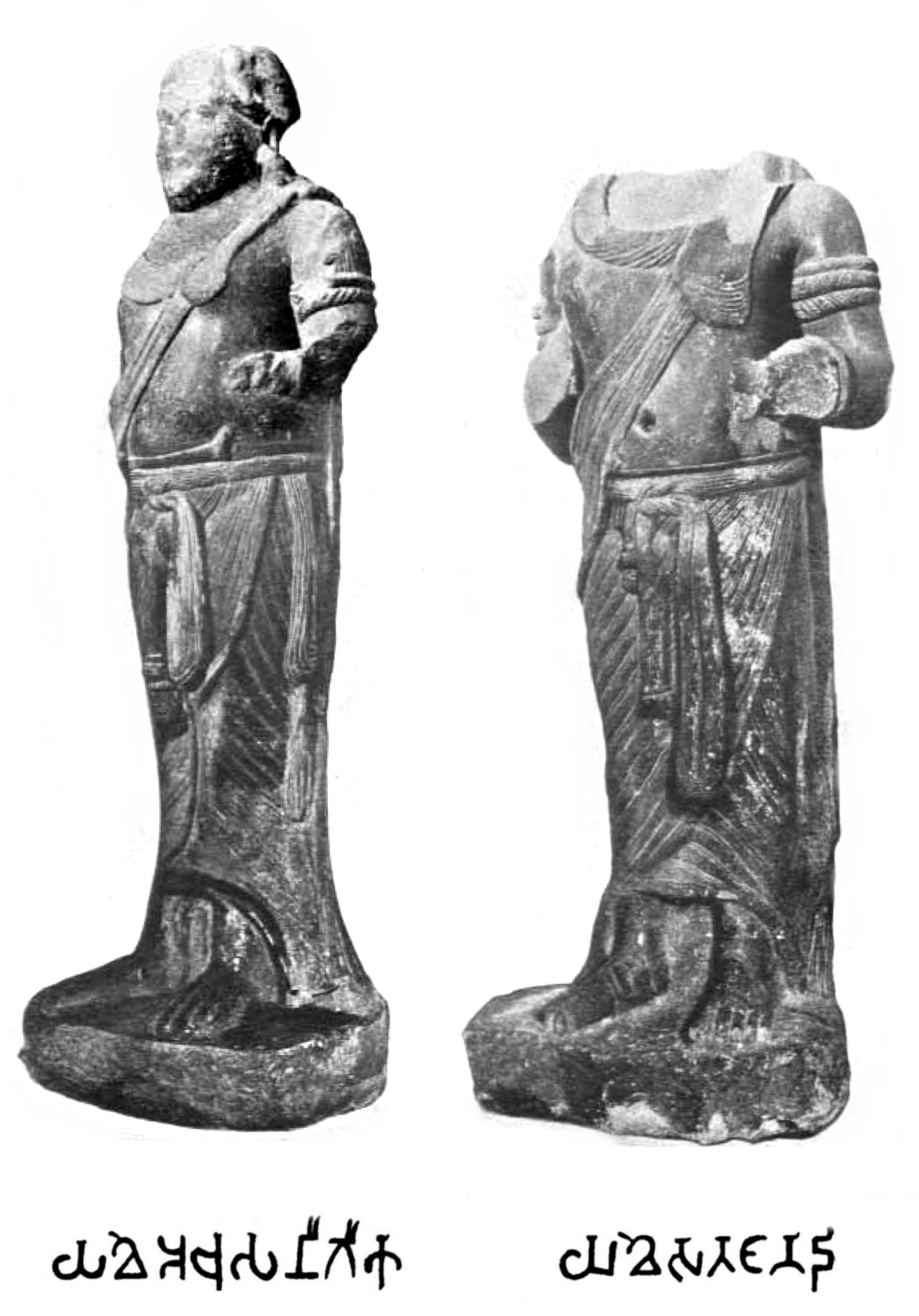
The two monumental Yakshas discovered in Patna (size: 2 meters tall), and thought to be 3rd century BCE. The two Brahmi inscriptions starting with... (Yakhe... for "Yaksha...") are paleographically of a later date, circa 2nd century CE Kushan. Left statue inscription: "Yakhe Achusatigika". Right statue inscription: "Yakhe Sanatananda". Indian Museum, Kolkota.

The work of local sculptors illustrates the popular art of the Mauryan period. This consisted of sculpture which probably was not commissioned by the emperor. The patrons of the popular art were the local governors and the more well-to-do subjects. It is represented by figures such as the female figure of Besnagar, the male figure of Parkham and the whisk-bearer from Didarganj (although its age is debated). Technically they are fashioned with less skill than the pillar capitals. They express a considerable earthiness and physical vitality.

The stone elephant at Dhauli was also probably carved by local craftsmen and not by the court-based artists who were responsible for the animal capitals. The image of the elephant emerging from the rock is a most impressive one, and its purpose was probably to draw attention to the inscription nearby.

=== Terracottas ===
Popular terracotta objects of various sizes have been found at Mauryan sites, and elsewhere, and are probably the most numerous Mauryan works of art. Made by local people who may not have been specialists, but for example potters with a sideline, they are very difficult to date if not recorded as coming from an identifiable archaeological context. Many are regarded as pre-Mauryan, but a continuation of the tradition of making mother-goddesses in clay, which dates back to the prehistoric period is revealed by the discovery of these objects at Mauryan levels during the excavations at Ahicchatra.

They are found more commonly from Pataliputra to Taxila. Many have stylized forms and technically they are more accomplished, in that they have a well-defined shape and clear ornamentation. Some appear to have been made from moulds, yet there is little duplication. Terracotas from Taxila consists of deity figures, votive reliefs with deities, toys, dice, ornaments and beads. Among the ornaments were round medallions, similar to the bullae worn by Roman boys. Terracotta images of folk gods and goddesses often have an earthy charm (some of them are perhaps dolls). Many animal figures are probably toys for children.

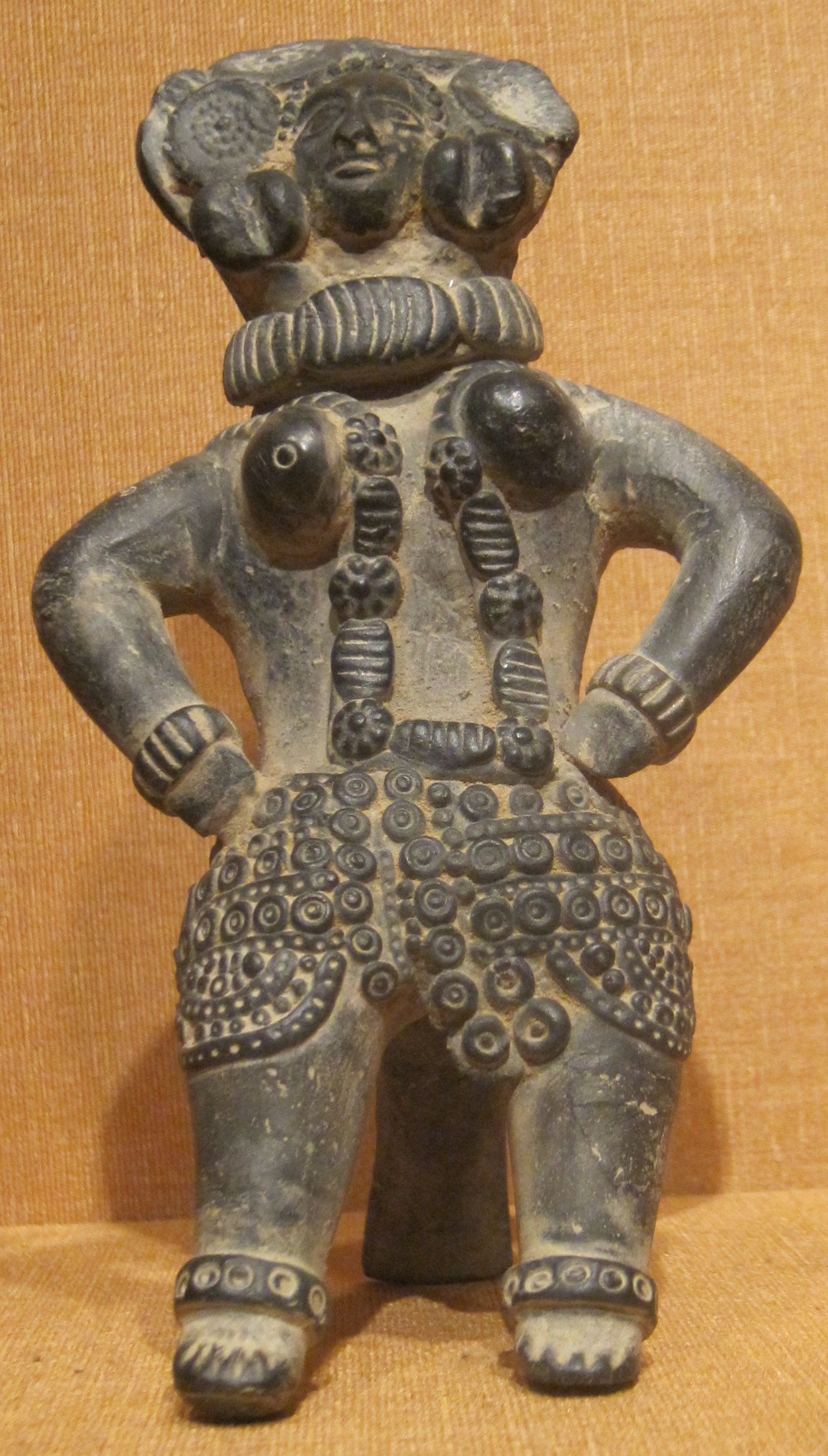
Female terracotta figure, northern India, c. 320-200 BCE

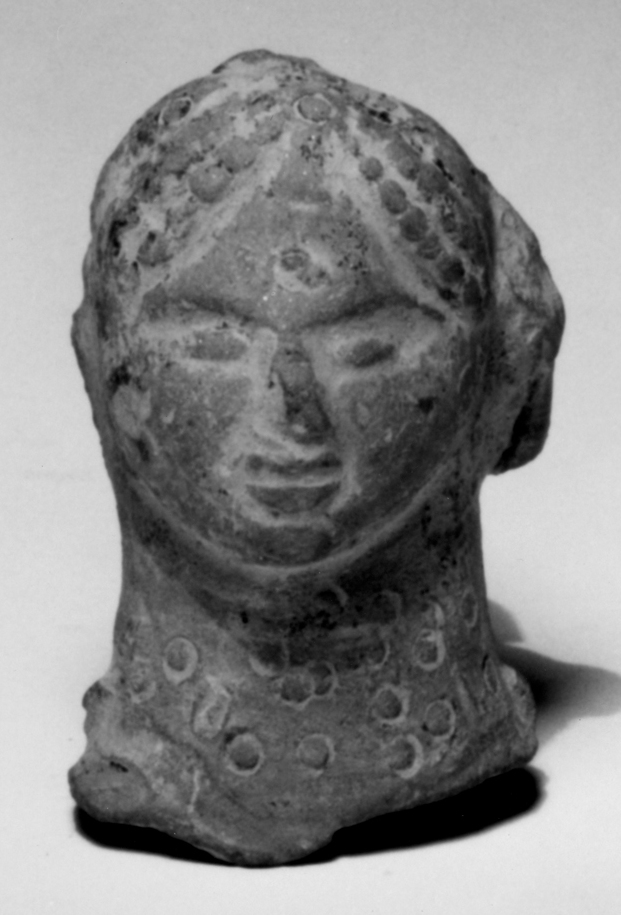
Head of an Indian Village Deity, terracotta, 3rd century BCE

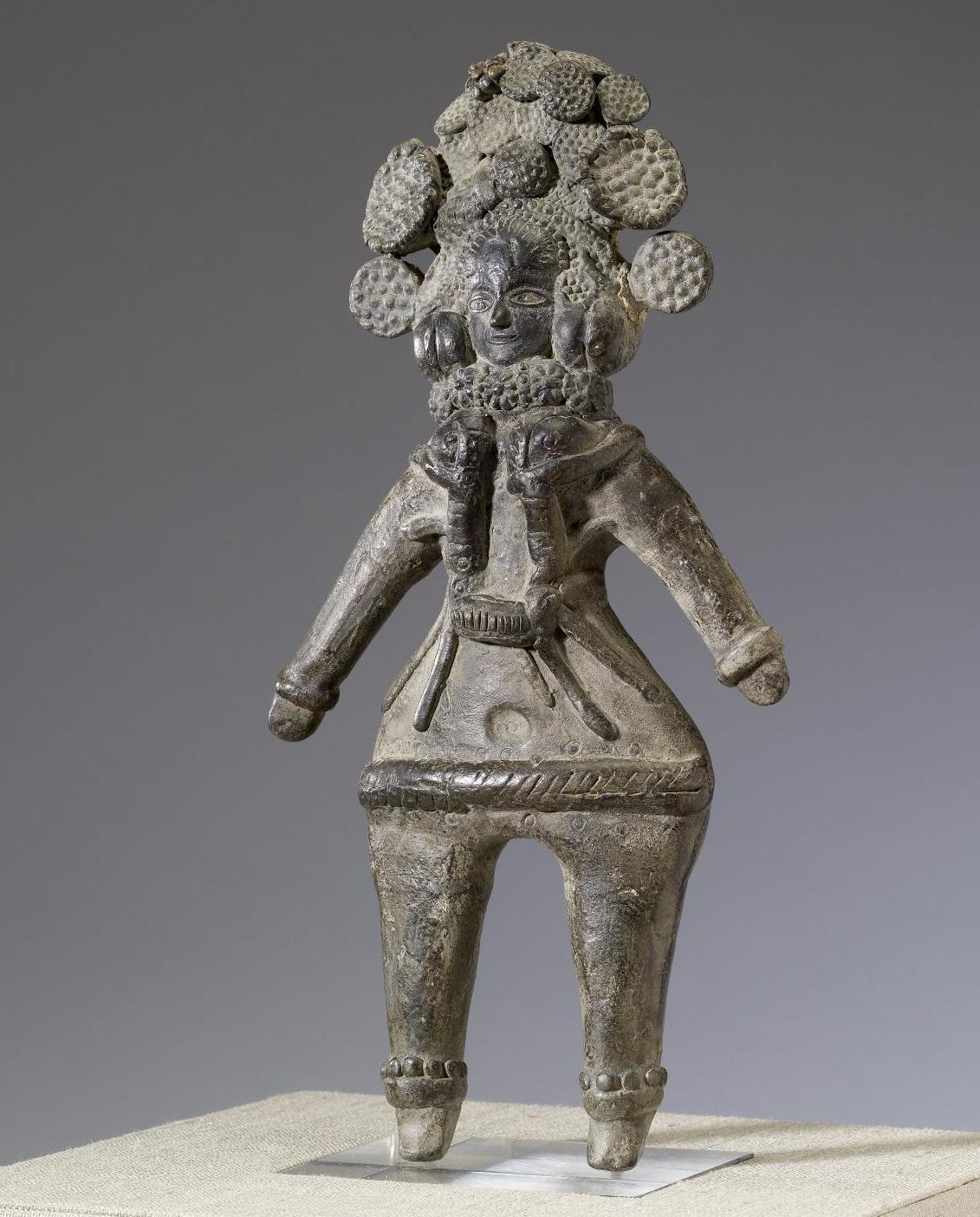
Mother goddess (terracotta) from Mathura, 3rd century BCE

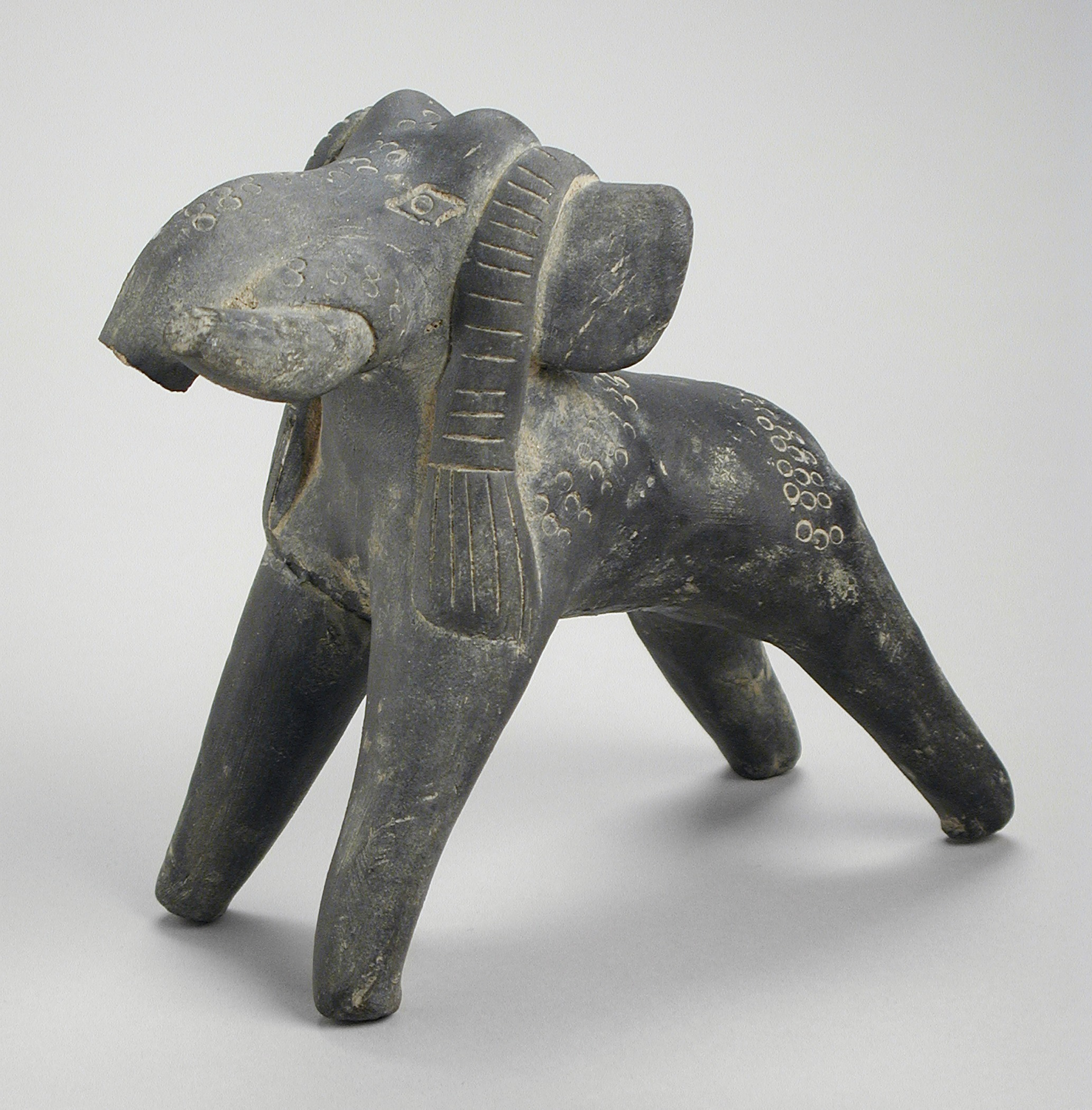
Elephant (terracotta) from Mathura, 3rd century BCE

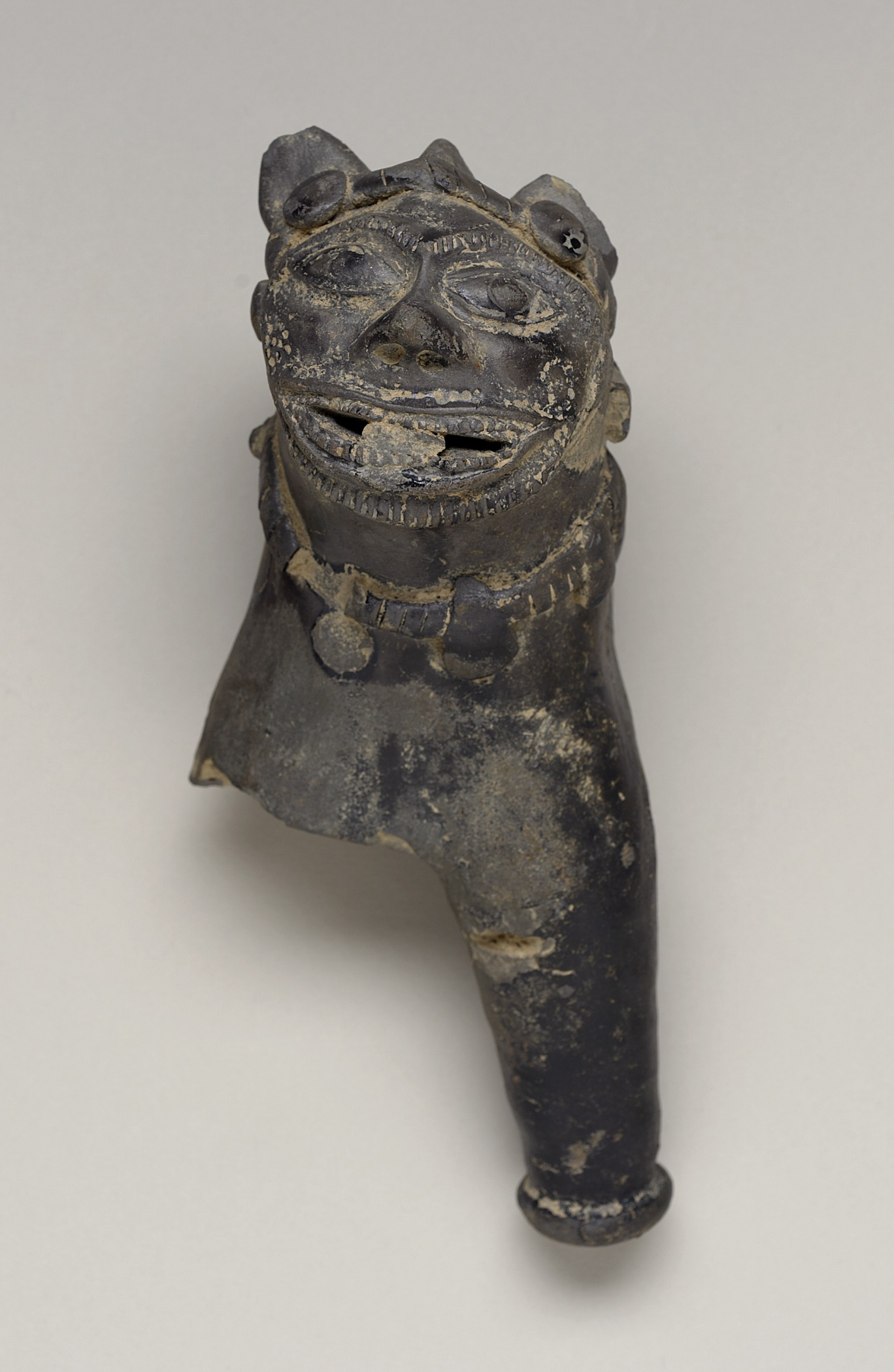
Forepart of an animal (terracotta) from Mathura, 3rd century BCE

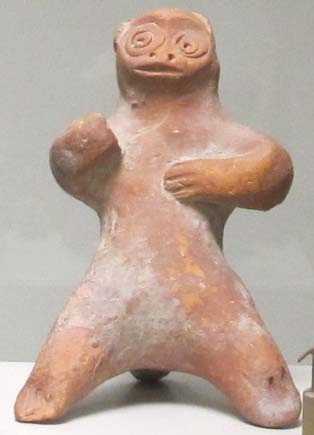
Monkey (terracotta) from Mathura, 3rd-2nd century BCE

=== Ringstones ===
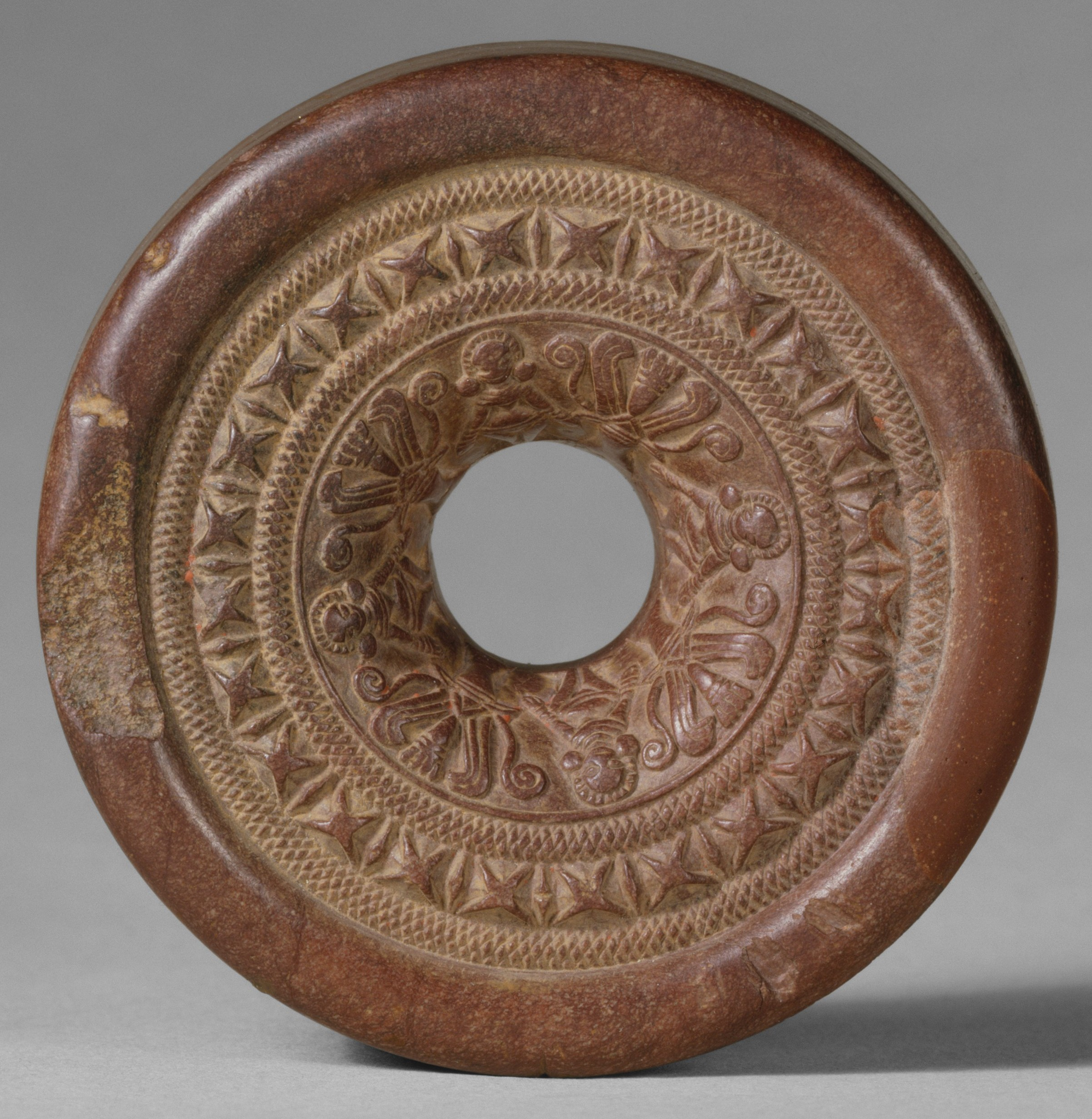
"Ringstone with Four Goddesses and Four Date Palms", Metropolitan Museum of Art (New York)

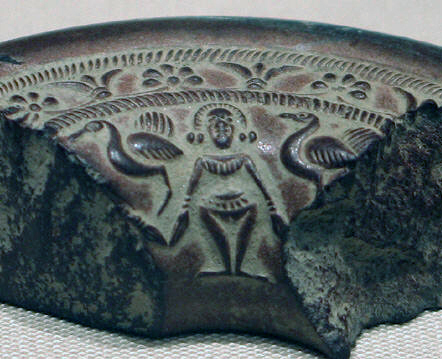
Broken section with "goddess" flanked by birds, probably geese, Metropolitan Museum of Art (New York)

The ringstone is a distinctive type of artefact and miniature sculpture made in India during the approximate period of the Mauryan Empire and the following Shunga Empire (185-73 BCE). They are usually dated to the 3rd or 2nd centuries BCE. They are shaped like a doughnut, but with straighter sides, and flat and plain on the bottom. They are in stone, with the top side very finely carved in relief with several circular zones of decoration running around the hole in the centre. When complete, they are about 2.5 to 4 inches across.

The designs vary, but all examples are finely carved, despite their small size. A number of components appear in a variety of variations. Typically the innermost zone, which runs down the sloping sides of the hole, has standing female figures, often nude or nearly so, but with jewellery and elaborate hairstyles, with trees in between them. These may be called "goddesses", or "mother goddesses", and the trees, apparently of various species, as the tree of life, but these interpretations are not universally accepted.

Their purpose, and any practical function, remains unclear and "enigmatic". They may have a specific religious purpose, or a more general one promoting fertility, or been used to make jewellery by hammering metal foil over the designs. About 70 have been found, many only as fragments, with a 2014 find in Thailand the first from outside the Indian subcontinent; it is assumed this was imported from India.

== Painting ==
It is clear from Megasthenes that the Mauryans had painting of some quality, but no examples have survived. Many centuries later, the paintings of the Ajanta Caves, the oldest significant body of Indian painting, show there was a well-developed tradition, which may well stretch back to Mauryan times.

== Architecture ==
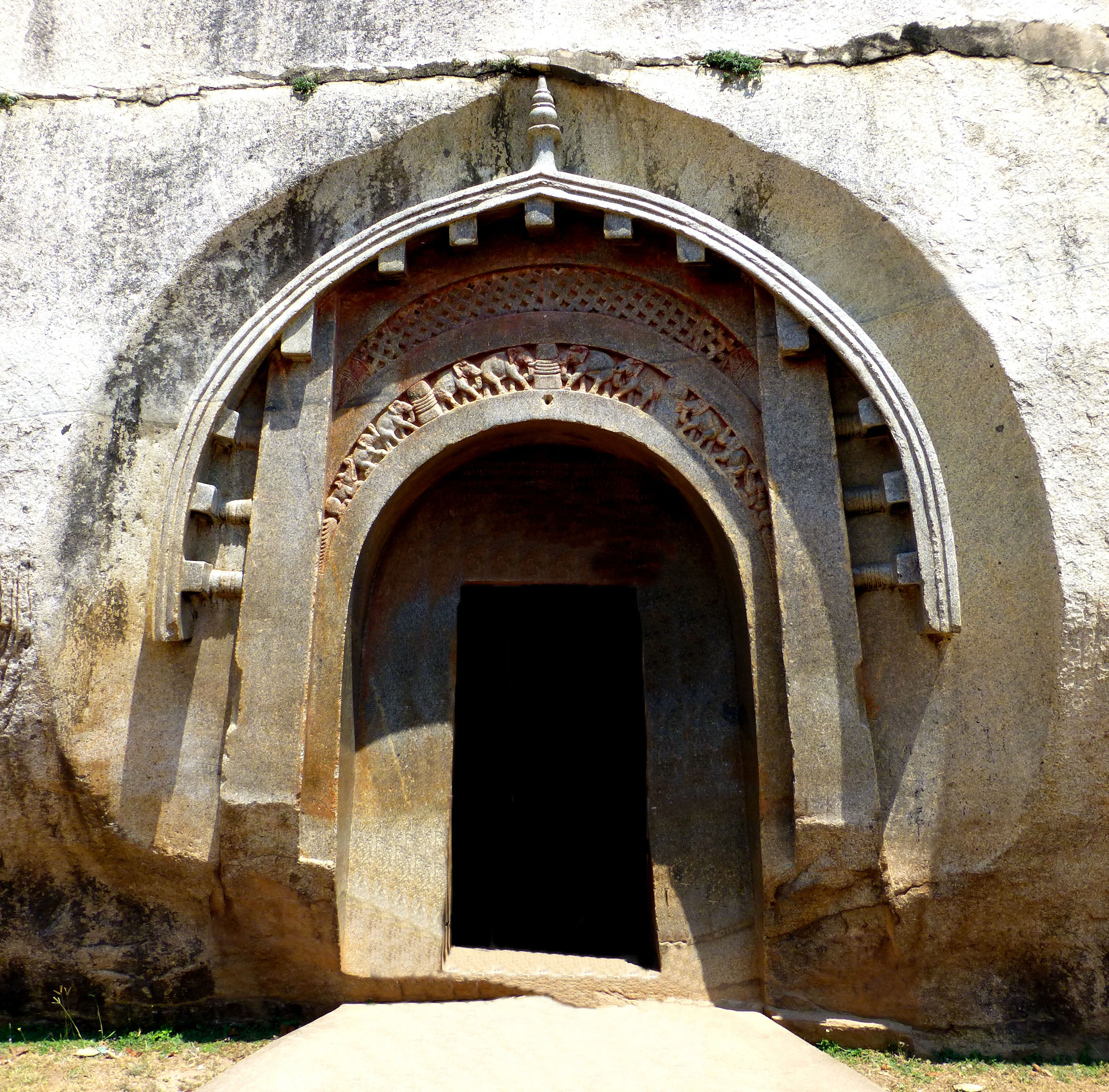
Lomas Rishi Cave in the Barabar Caves, 3rd century BCE.

While the period marked a second transition to use of brick and stone, wood was still the material of choice. Kautilya in the Arthashastra advises the use of brick and stone for their durability. Yet he devotes a large section to safeguards to be taken against conflagrations in wooden buildings indicating their popularity.

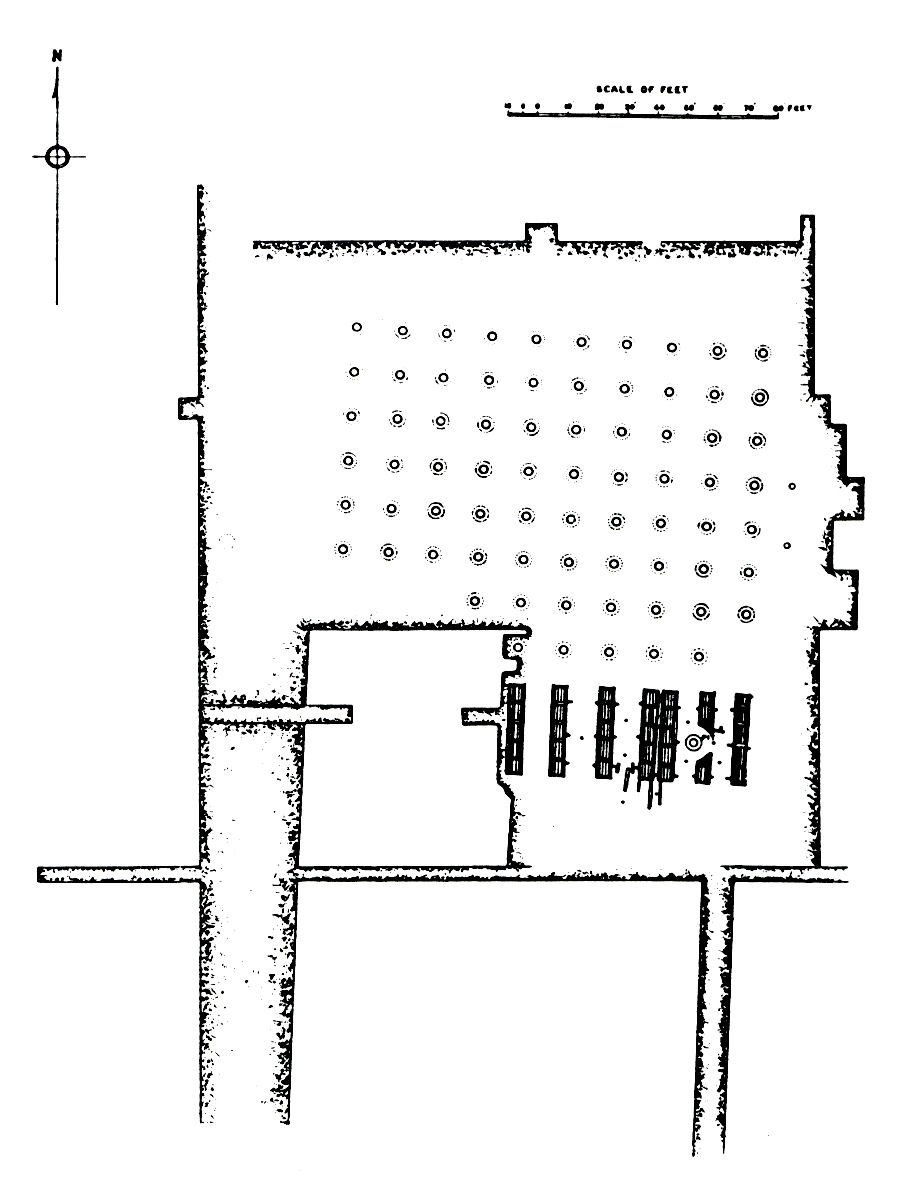
Plan of the 80-columns pillared hall in Kumhrar.

The Greek ambassador Megasthenes mentions that the capital city of Pataliputra was encircled by a massive timber-palisade, perforated by holes or slits through which archers could shoot. It had sixty-four gates and 570 towers. According to Strabo, the gilded pillars of the palace were adorned with golden vines and silver birds. The palace stood in an extensive park studded with fish ponds. It was furnished with a great variety of ornamental trees and shrubs. Excavations carried out by Spooner and Waddell have brought to light remains of huge wooden palisades at Bulandi Bagh in Pataliputra. The remains of one of the buildings, an 80 pillared hall at Kumrahar are of particular significance. Out of 80 stone columns, that once stood on a wooden platform and supported a wooden roof, Spooner was able to discover the entire lower part of at least one in almost perfect conditions. It is more or less similar to an Ashokan pillar, smooth, polished and made of grey Chunar sandstone.

Many stupas like those at Sanchi, Sarnath and possibly Amaravati Stupa were originally built as brick and masonry mounds during the reign of Ashoka. Most were renovated many times, which leaves us with hardly a clue of the original structures.

== Pottery ==
Use of the potters wheel became universal. The pottery associated with the Mauryan period consists of many types of ware. But the most highly developed technique is seen in a special type of pottery known as the Northern Black Polished Ware (NBP), which was the hallmark of the preceding and early Mauryan periods. The NBP ware is made of finely levigated alluvial clay, which when seen in section is usually of a grey and sometimes of a red hue. It has a brilliantly burnished dressing of the quality of a glaze which ranges from a jet black to a deep grey or a metallic steel blue. Occasionally small red-brown patches are apparent on the surface. It can be distinguished from other polished or graphite-coated red wares by its peculiar lustre and brilliance.

This ware was used largely for dishes and small bowls. It is found in abundance in the Ganges valley. Although NBP was not very rare, it was obviously a more expensive ware than the other varieties, since potsherds of NBP were occasionally found riveted with copper pins indicating that even a cracked vessel in NBP ware had its value.

== Coins ==
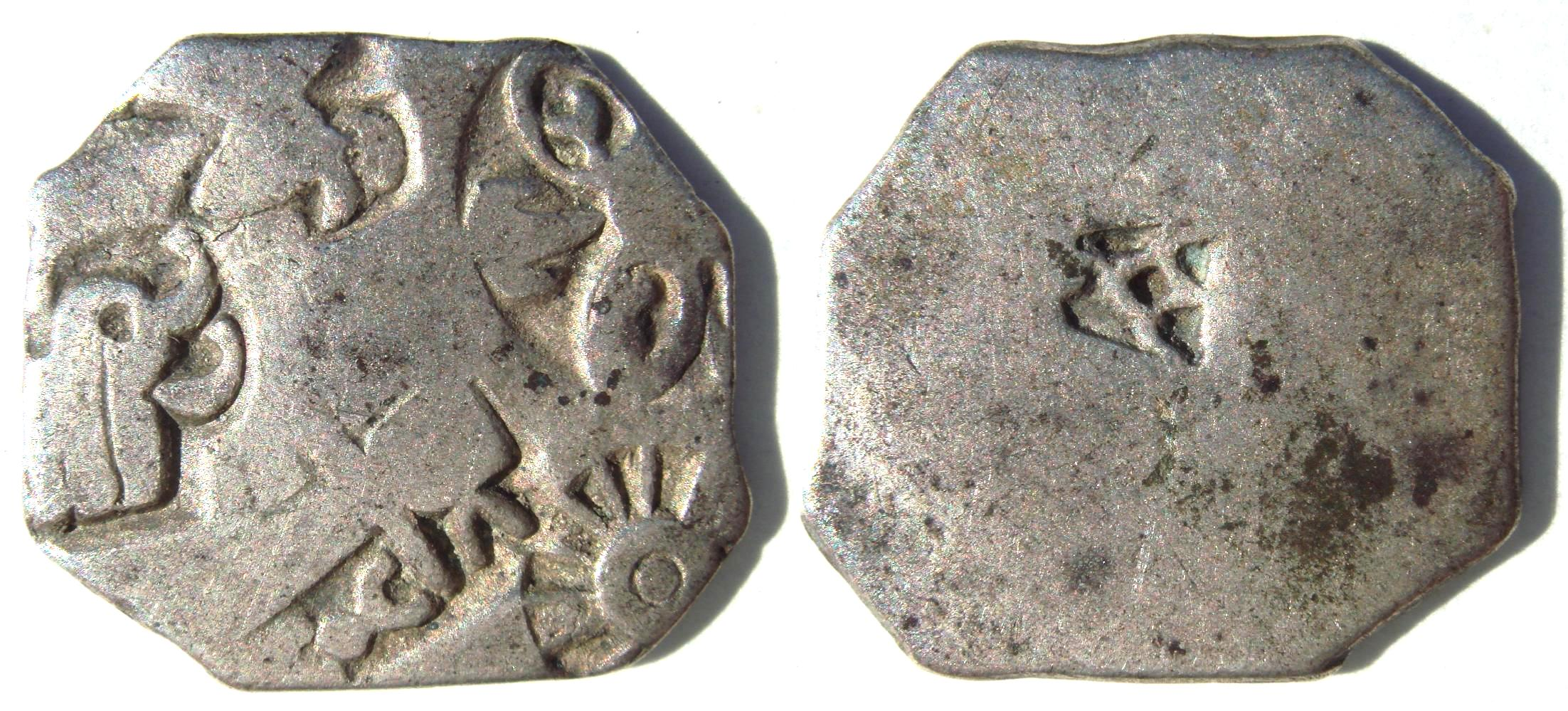
Silver punch-marked coin of the Mauryan Empire, with symbols of the wheel and elephant (3rd century BCE)

The coins issued by the Mauryans are mostly silver and a few copper pieces of metal in various shapes, sizes and weights and which have one or more symbols punched on them. The most common symbols are the elephant, the tree in railing symbol and the mountain. The technique of producing such coins was generally that the metal was cut first and then the device was punched. These symbols are said to have either represented the Royal insignia or the symbol of the local guild that struck the coin. Some coins had Shroff (money changer) marks on them indicating that older coins were often re-issued.

The alloy content closely resembles that specified in the Arthashastra. Based on his identification of the symbols on the punch-marked coins with certain Mauryan rulers, Kosambi argued that the Mauryan punch-marked Karshapana after Chandragupta has the same weight as its predecessor, but much more copper, cruder fabric, and such a large variation in weight that the manufacture must have been hasty. This evidence of stress and unsatisfied currency demand is accompanied by debasement (inflation) plus vanishing of the reverse marks which denoted the ancient trade guilds. This in his opinion indicated that there was a fiscal crisis in the later Mauryan period. However his method of analysis and the chronological identification has been questioned.

== Gallery ==
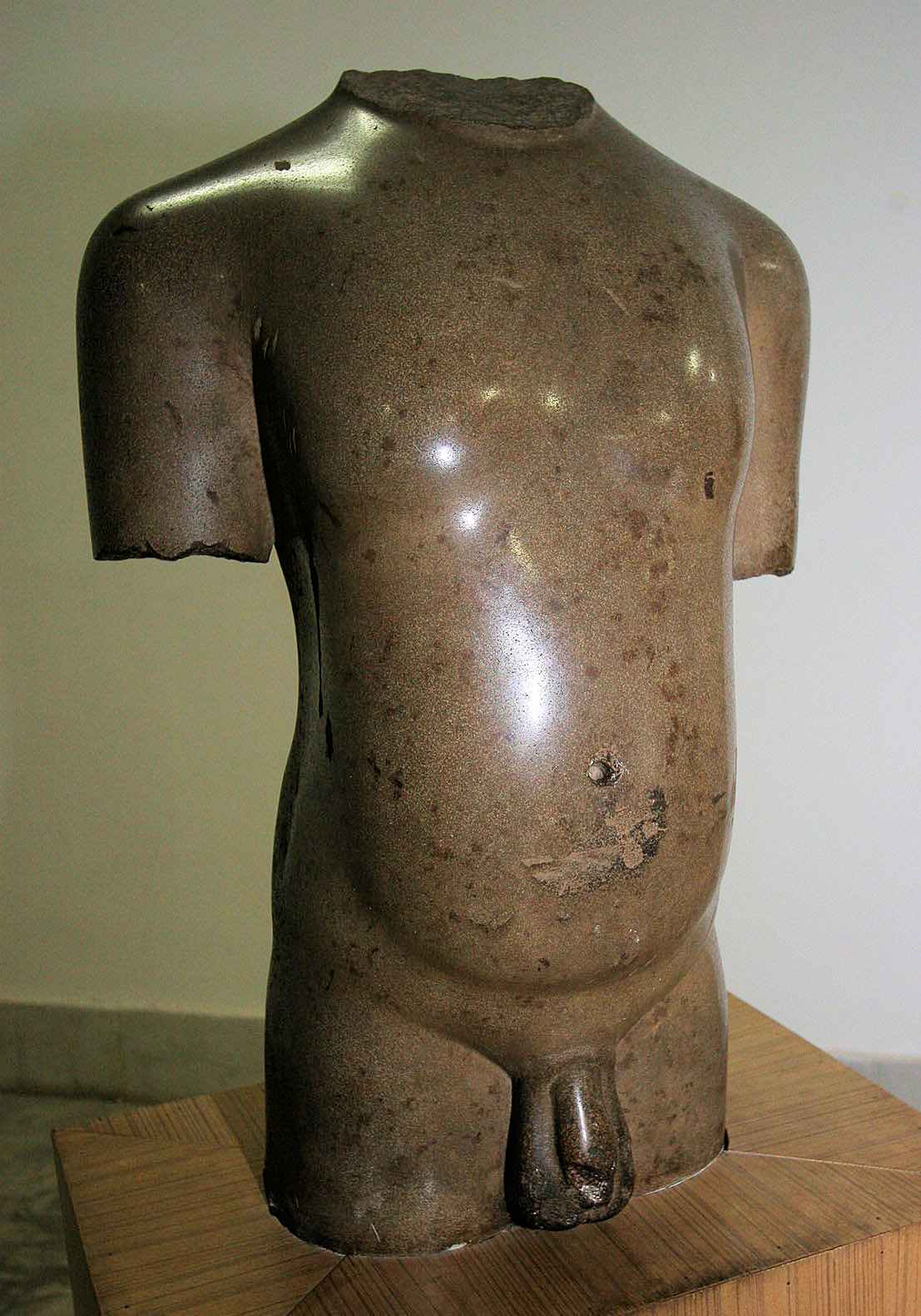
The Lohanipur torso.

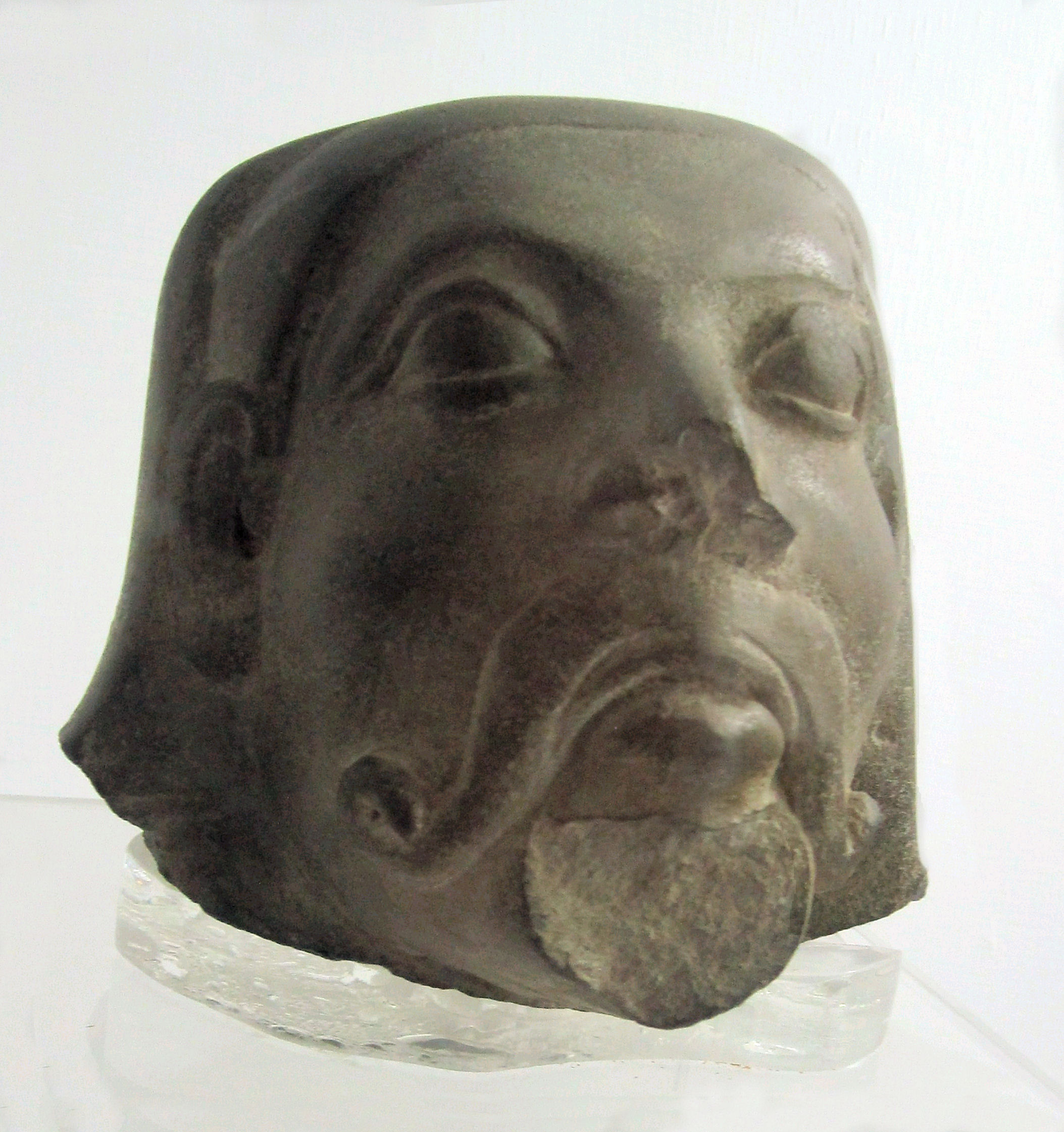
Head from Sarnath

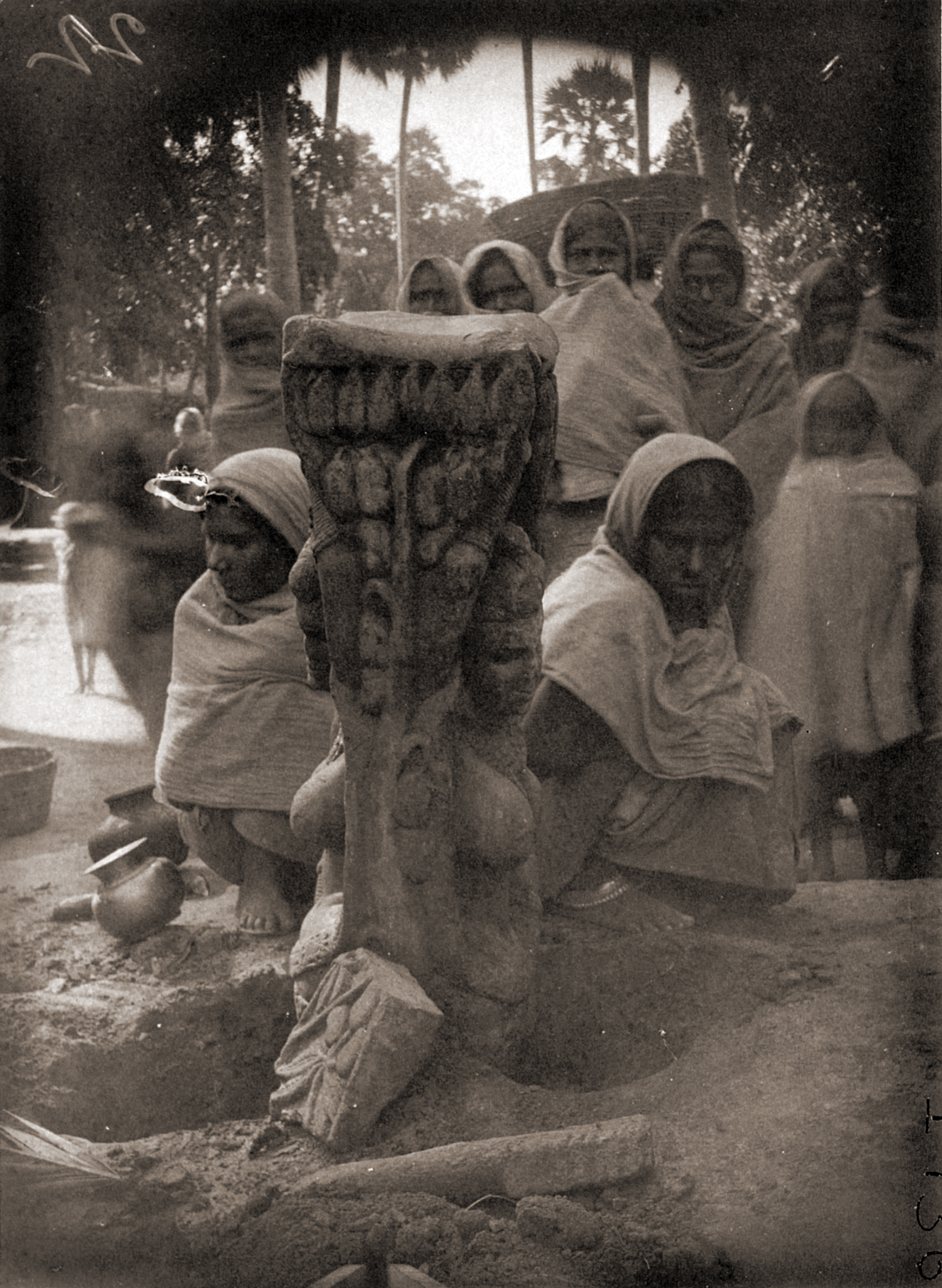
Statue of Matrikas found near Agam Kuan, Patna

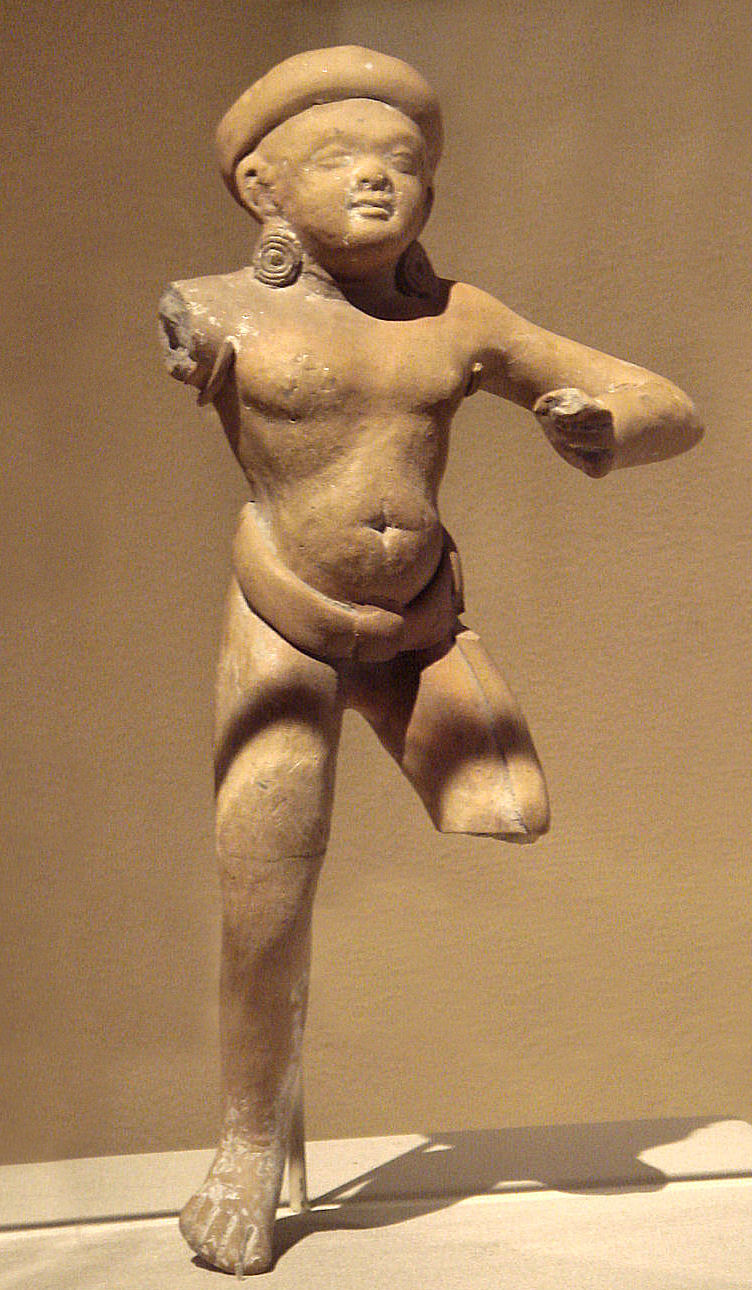
2nd-century statuette

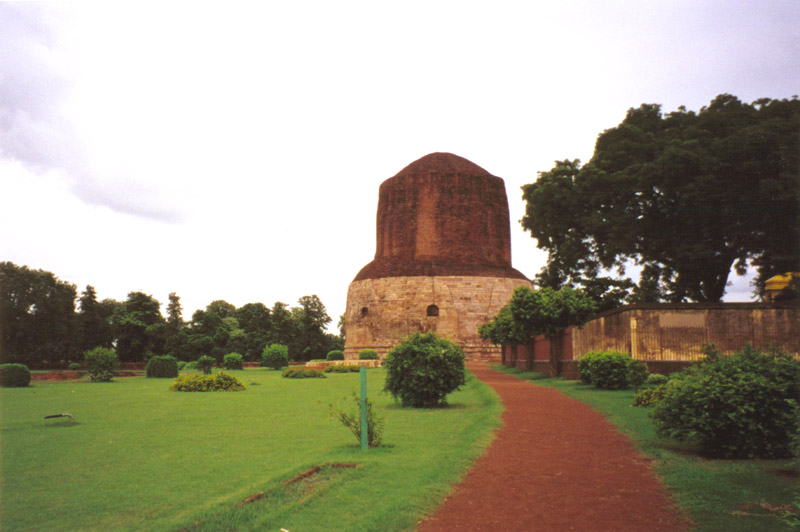
Dharmek Stupa at Sarnath

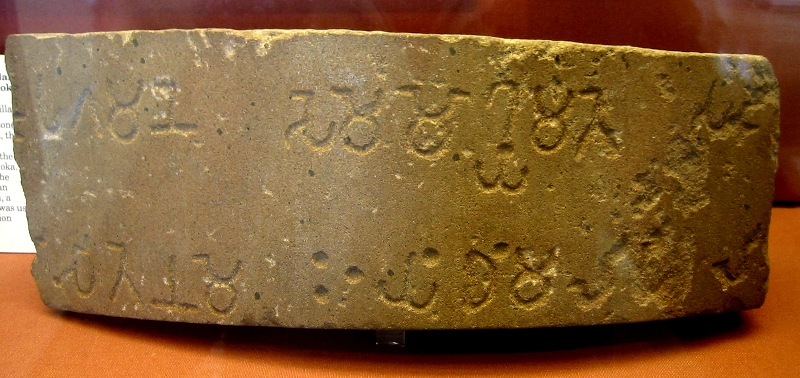
Fragment of the 6th Pillar Edict of Ashoka (238 BCE), in Brahmi, sandstone, British Museum

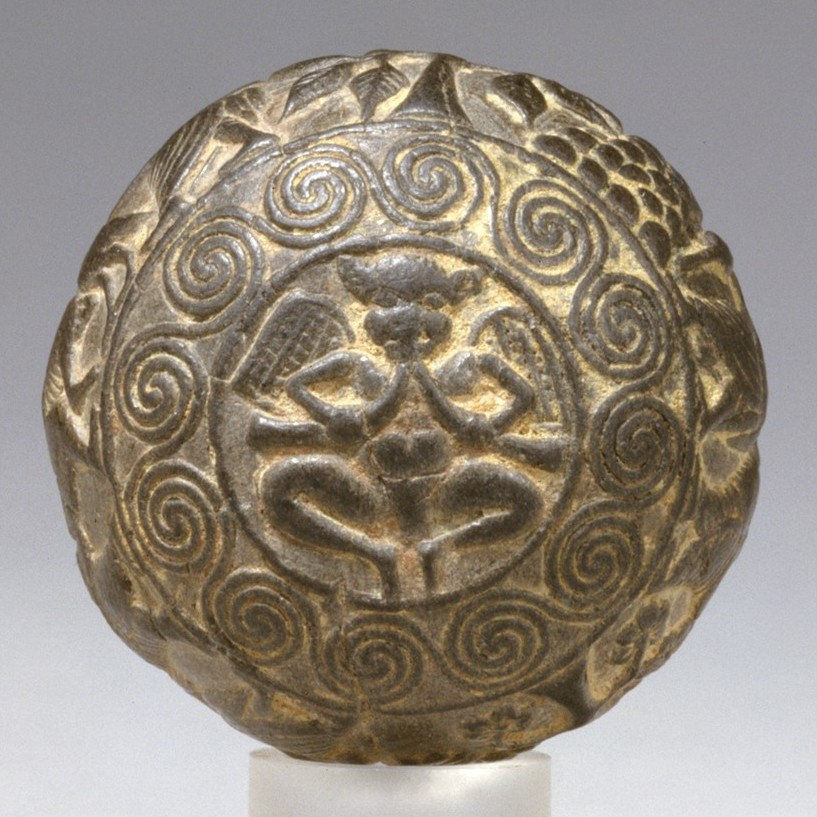
Stone Sphere with Scenes of Rites at the Shrine of a Yaksha (male nature spirit) (Maurya period, 3rd century BCE)

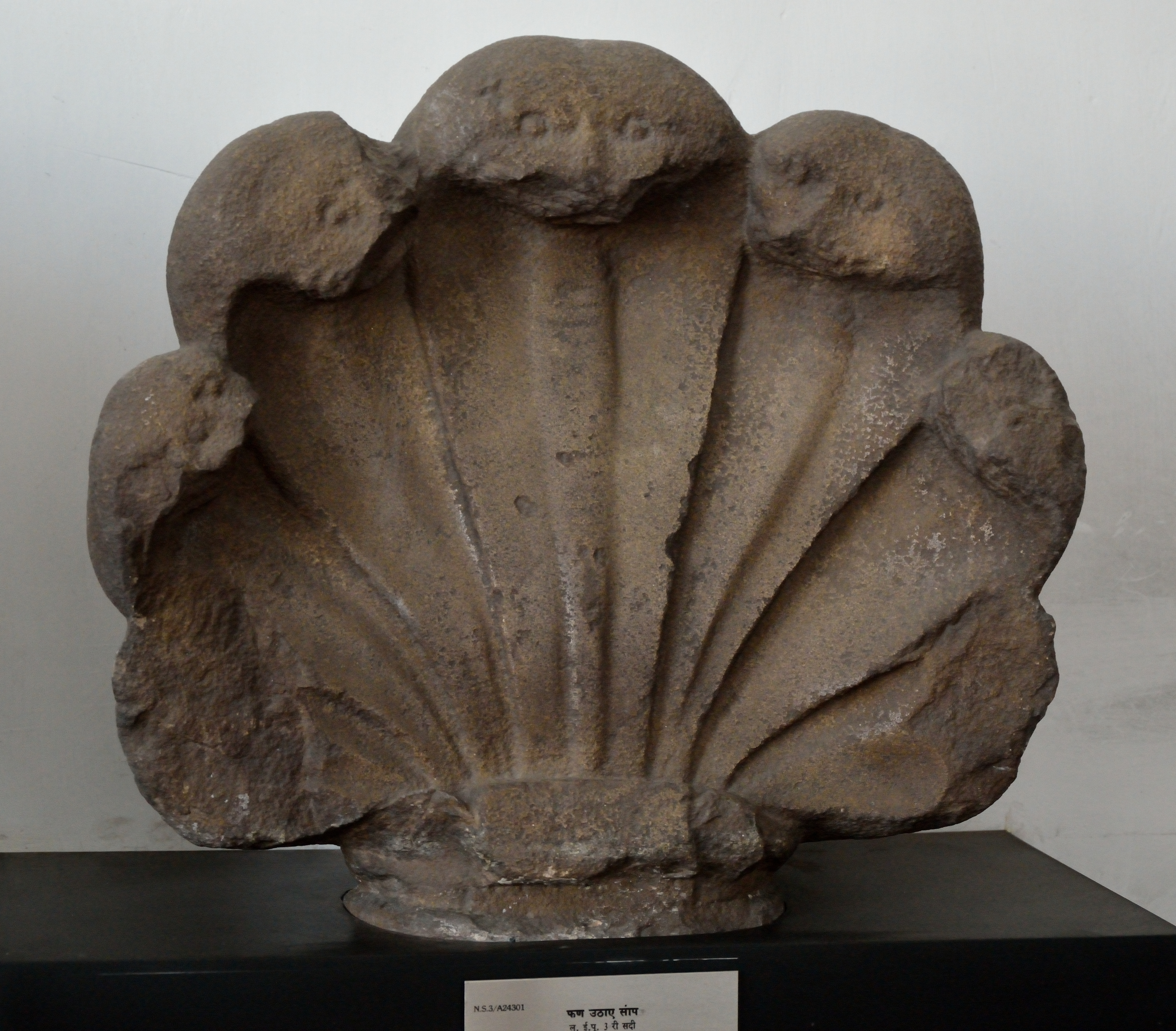
Serpent Hood (Chunar sandstone) from Rajgir, ca. 3rd century BCE

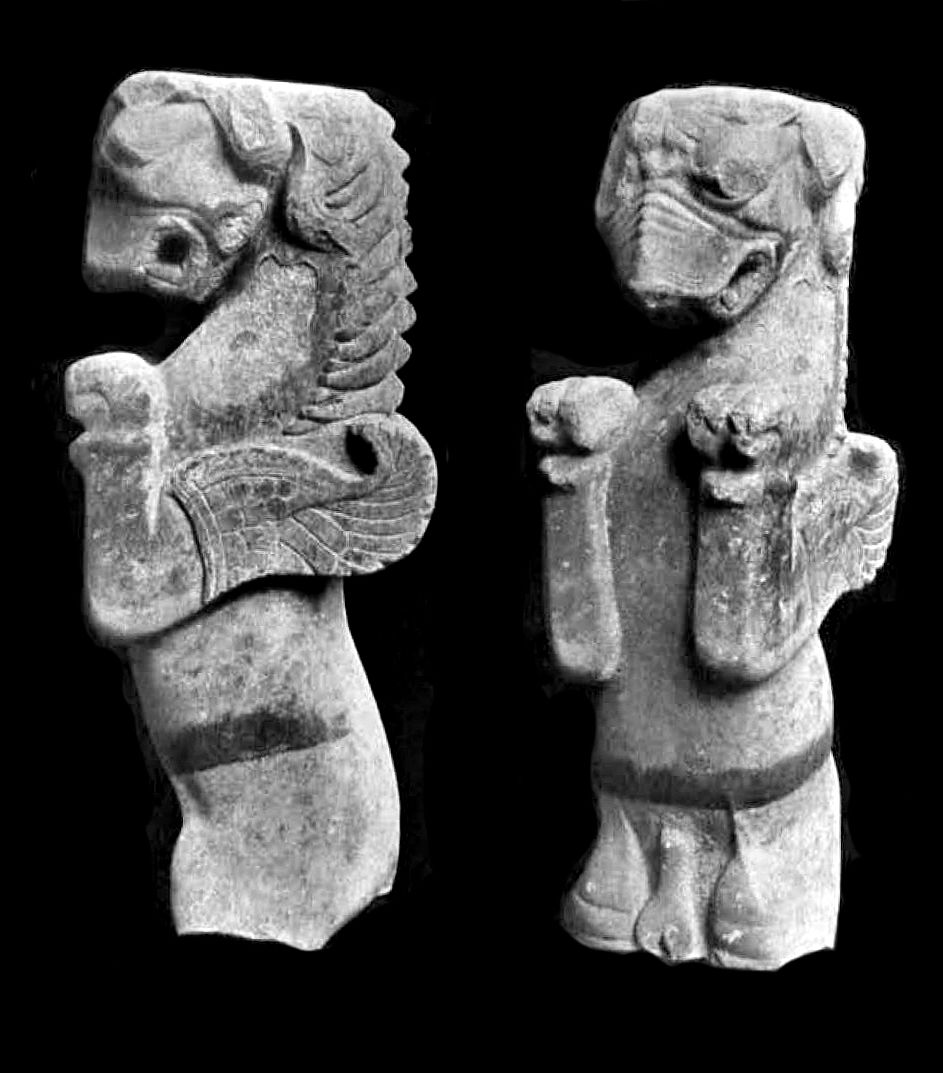
Patna griffin

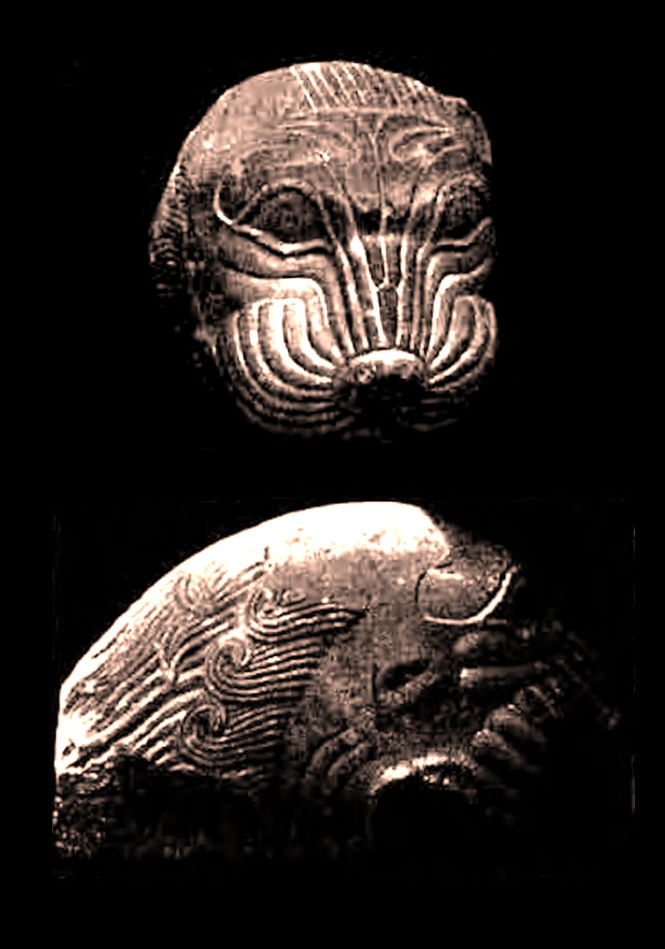
Masarh lion
