= Chunar stone =

Chunar stone or Red-spotted sandstone is a kind of reddish or buff-colored, finely grained, hard sandstone quarried in the Chunar in the Mirzapur District of Uttar Pradesh, and widely used in the architecture of India.

== Background ==
Notable buildings and monuments carved from chunar stone include:

- Pillars of Ashoka.
- Buddha Preaching his First Sermon (Sarnath)
- St. Paul's Cathedral, Kolkata.
