= Mauryan polish =

Maurya Empire art characteristic

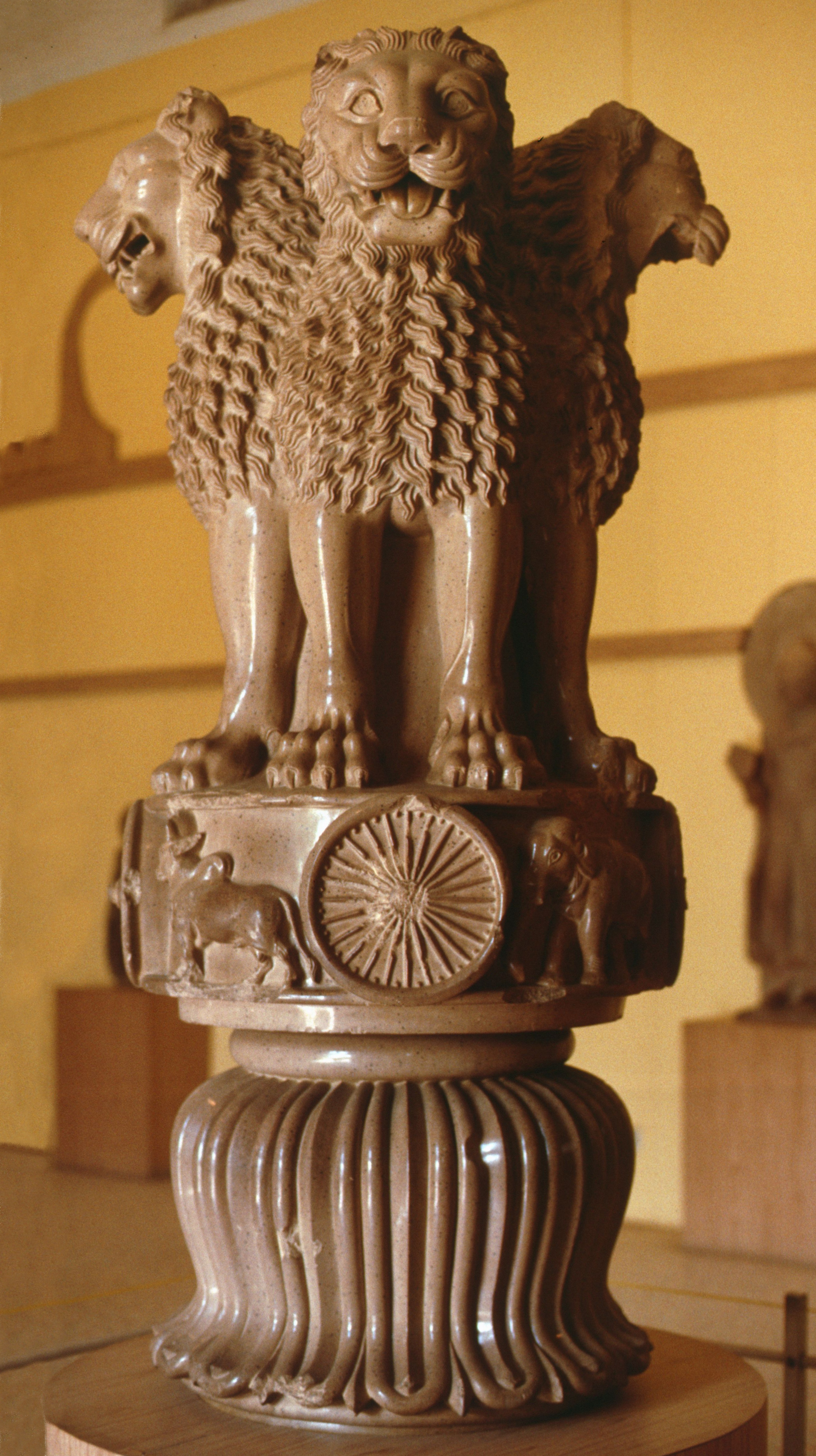
- The Lion Capital of Ashoka from Sarnath, one of the finest examples of Mauryan polish.
- Material: Polished sandstone
- Period/culture: 3rd Century BCE
- Place: India.

Mauryan polish describes one of the frequent characteristics of architecture and sculptures of the Maurya Empire in India (325 to 185 BCE), which gives a very smooth and shiny surface to the stone material, generally of sandstone or granite. Mauryan polish is found especially in the Ashoka Pillars as well as in some constructions like the Barabar Caves. The technique did not end with the empire, but continued to be "used on occasion up to the first or second century A.D.", although the presence of the polish sometimes complicates dating, as with the Didarganj Yakshi. According to the archaeologist John Marshall: the "extraordinary precision and accuracy which characterizes all Mauryan works, and which has never, we venture to say, been surpassed even by the finest workmanship on Athenian buildings".

== Polished Barabar Caves ==
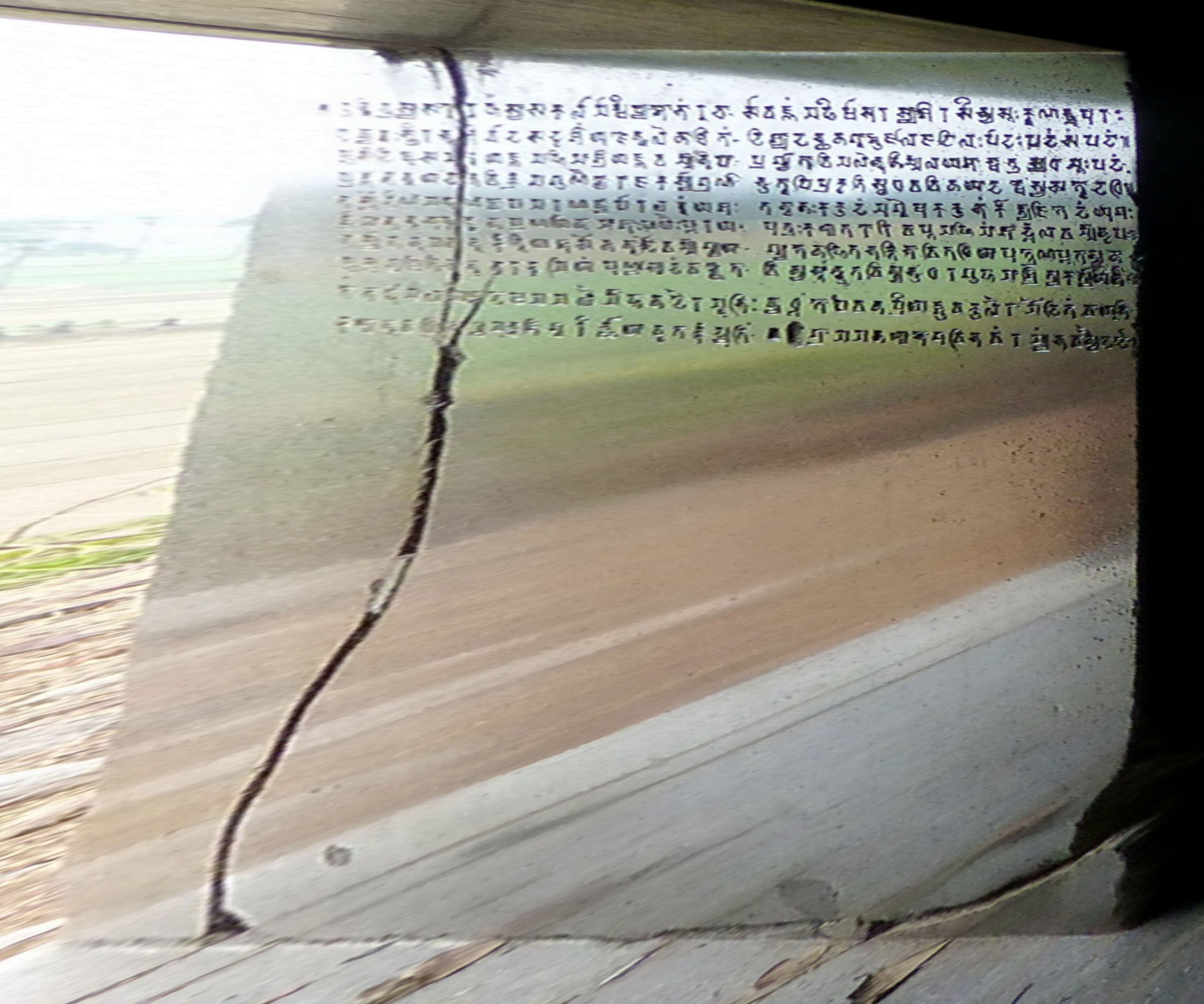
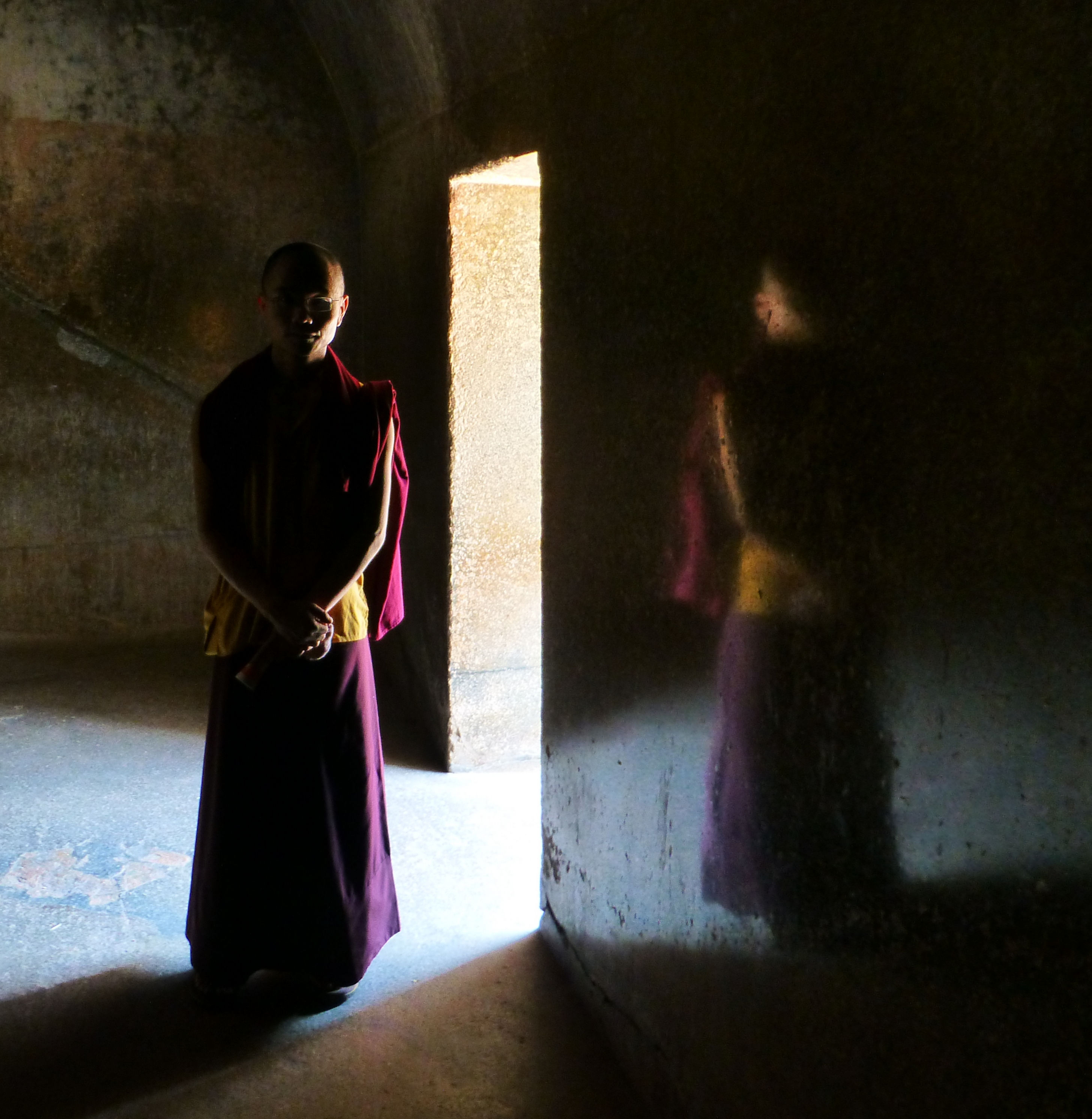
Polishing "mirror-like" granite walls. Left: wall of the corridor entrance of the Gopika cave in the Barabar Caves (mirror effect accentuated by the flat angle of the photograph). Right: interior of the Sudama cave, also one of the Barabar caves, with reflection of a monk. These quasi-perfect walls were dug into the rock and polished before 261 BC, date of the rather clumsy inscriptions of Ashoka.

The Barabar Caves are the first known and dated example of Mauryan polish, dedicated by Ashoka in several inscriptions, in the year 12 and the year 19 of his reign. The caves were carved from granite, an extremely hard rock, and finished with a very fine polishing of the inner surface, giving a mirror effect of great flatness, as well as an echo effect. This large-scale polish directly evokes polishing on smaller surfaces of the Maurya statuary, particularly visible on the pillars and capitals of the pillars of Ashoka.

The knowledge and skills for such polishing seems to have disappeared again after the Maurya period, as subsequent caves, such as the Ajanta Caves, do not have polished surfaces.

At Barabar Caves, some caves were dedicated through inscription by Ashoka (the caves of the Barabar group), and by his grandson and successor Dasaratha Maurya (the caves of the Nagarjuni group). Both group of caves have perfectly polished walls, suggesting that polishing techniques were not exclusive to Ashoka, and continued for some time after his reign.

Later Caves

After the Barabar Caves, the polishing of cave walls was abandoned, never to be revived, despite the huge efforts at building Buddhist and Jain caves until the 6th century CE. Such grandiose caves as Karla Caves (1st century CE) or the Ajanta Caves (5th century CE) do not have any polishing either. This may be due to the fact that Mauryan caves were dedicated and sponsored by the Mauryan Imperial government, allowing for huge resources and efforts to be spent, whereas later caves where essentially the result of donations by individuals, who could not afford as high a level of spending.

== Pillars of Ashoka ==
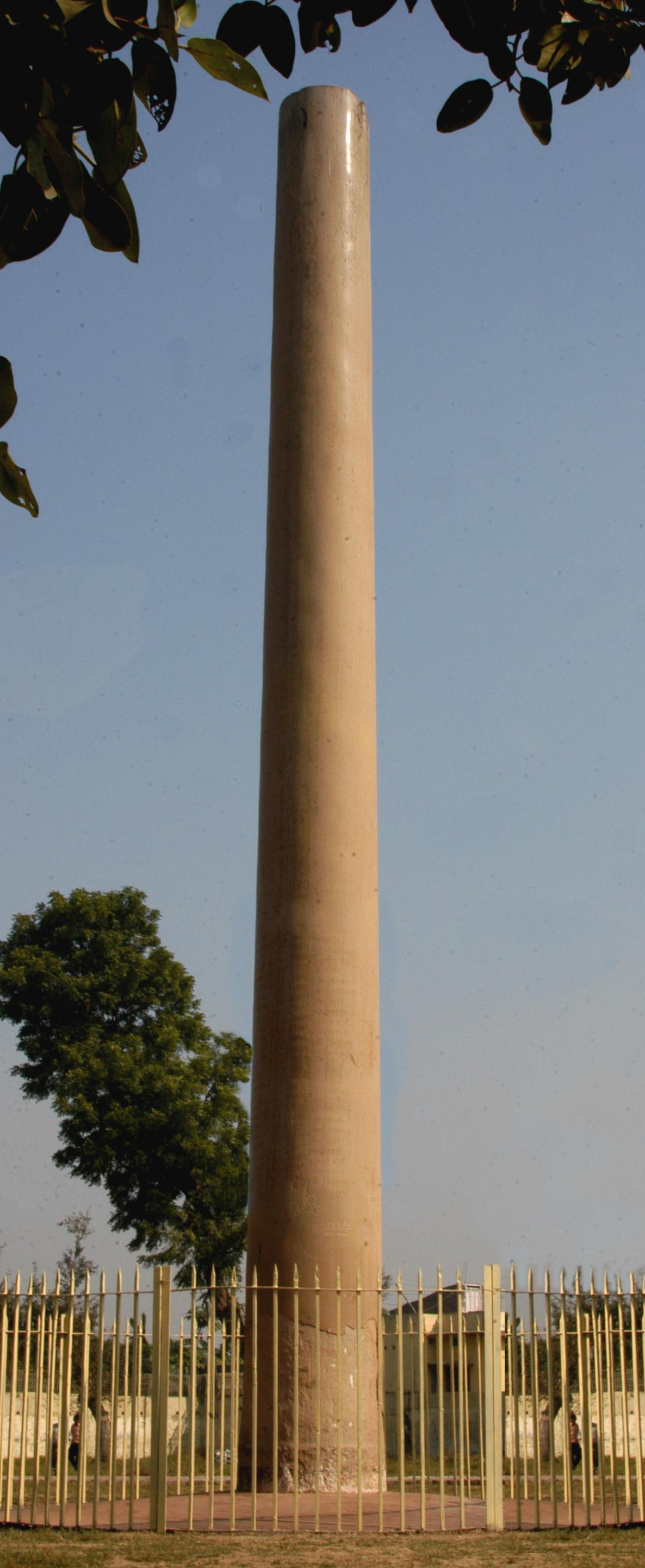
A highly polished pillar of Ashoka, Lauriya-Araraj.

The pillars of Ashoka, made of sandstone, generally also exhibit a high level of Mauryan polish. Here again the mirror-like polish has generally been considered as an import from the Near-East, but some authors now consider the Son Bhandar Caves might constitute a precedent and an evolutionary step to this type of polish, although these caves are generally dated to a much later period (2-4th century CE).

=== The pillars ===
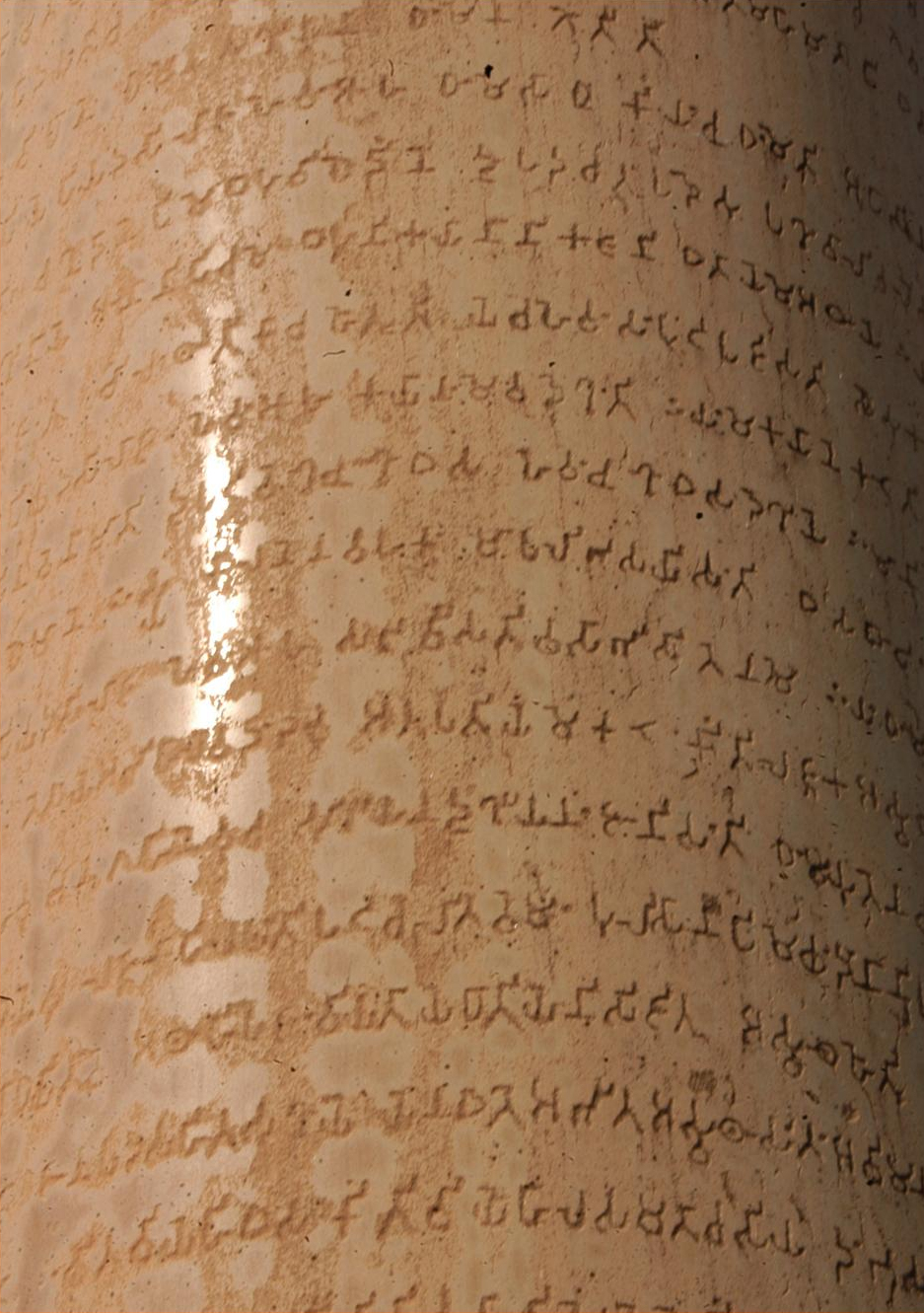
Polished surface of a pillar.

All known Mauryan pillars have the characteristic mirror-like polish, although most were left unpolished over the surface of the bottom part meant to be buried in the ground.

Inscriptions were made over the polished finish, with the ungainly result that the polished stone is chipped around the letters. Normally, the text should be inscribed first, and only then should the stone be polished if a good result is to be obtained. This tends to suggest that the inscriptions were made as an afterthought, after the pillar has been properly completed.

=== The capitals ===
Some of the capitals of the pillars of Ashoka exhibit mirror-like polish (such as the Sarnath and the Sanchi capitals), while others don't and only have a smooth surface (the Sankissa capital or the Rampurva bull elephant). This, together with epigraphical considerations, has even led some authors to question if these non-polished capital might be of a time prior to Ashoka.

These non-polished pillars are also those that display the highest level of Hellenistic influence: in the case of the Rampurva bull or the Sankassa elephant, the abacus is composed of honeysuckles alternated with stylized palmettes and small rosettes. A similar kind of design can be seen in the frieze of the lost capital of the Allahabad pillar. These designs likely originated in Greek and Near-Eastern arts.

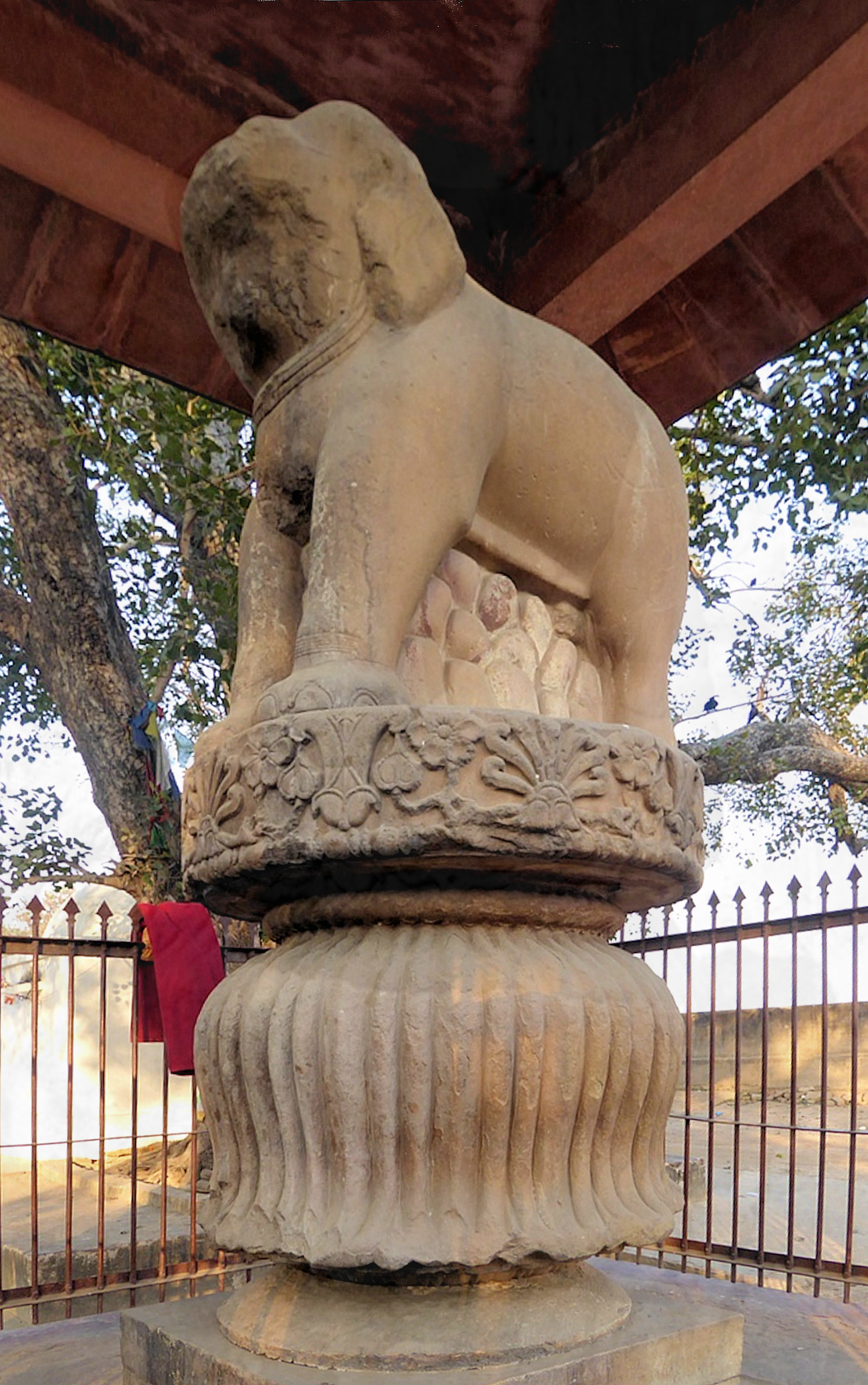
Sankissa elephant. Non polished.

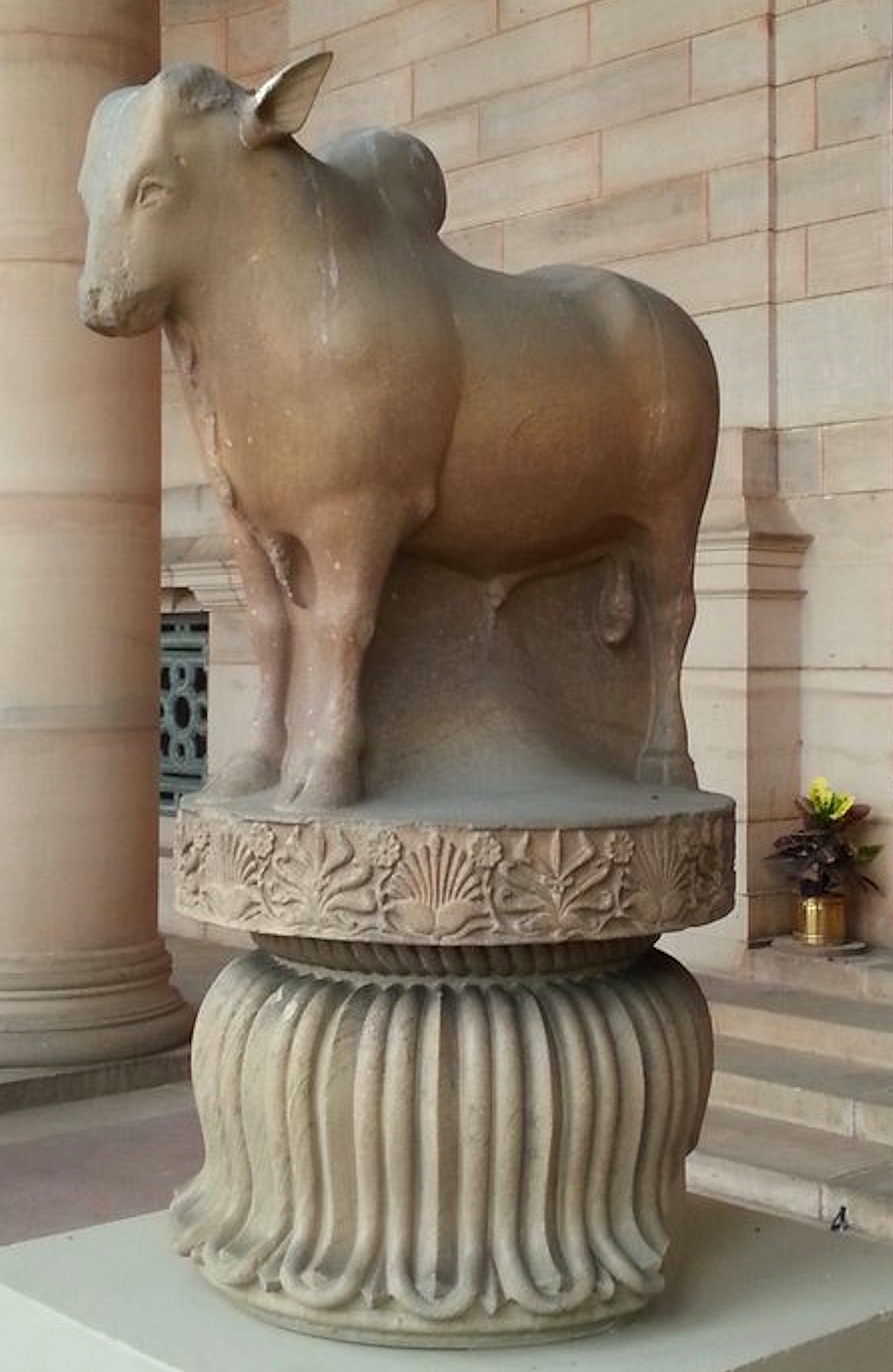
Rampurva zebu bull original (Rashtrapati Bhavan, New Delhi). Non polished.

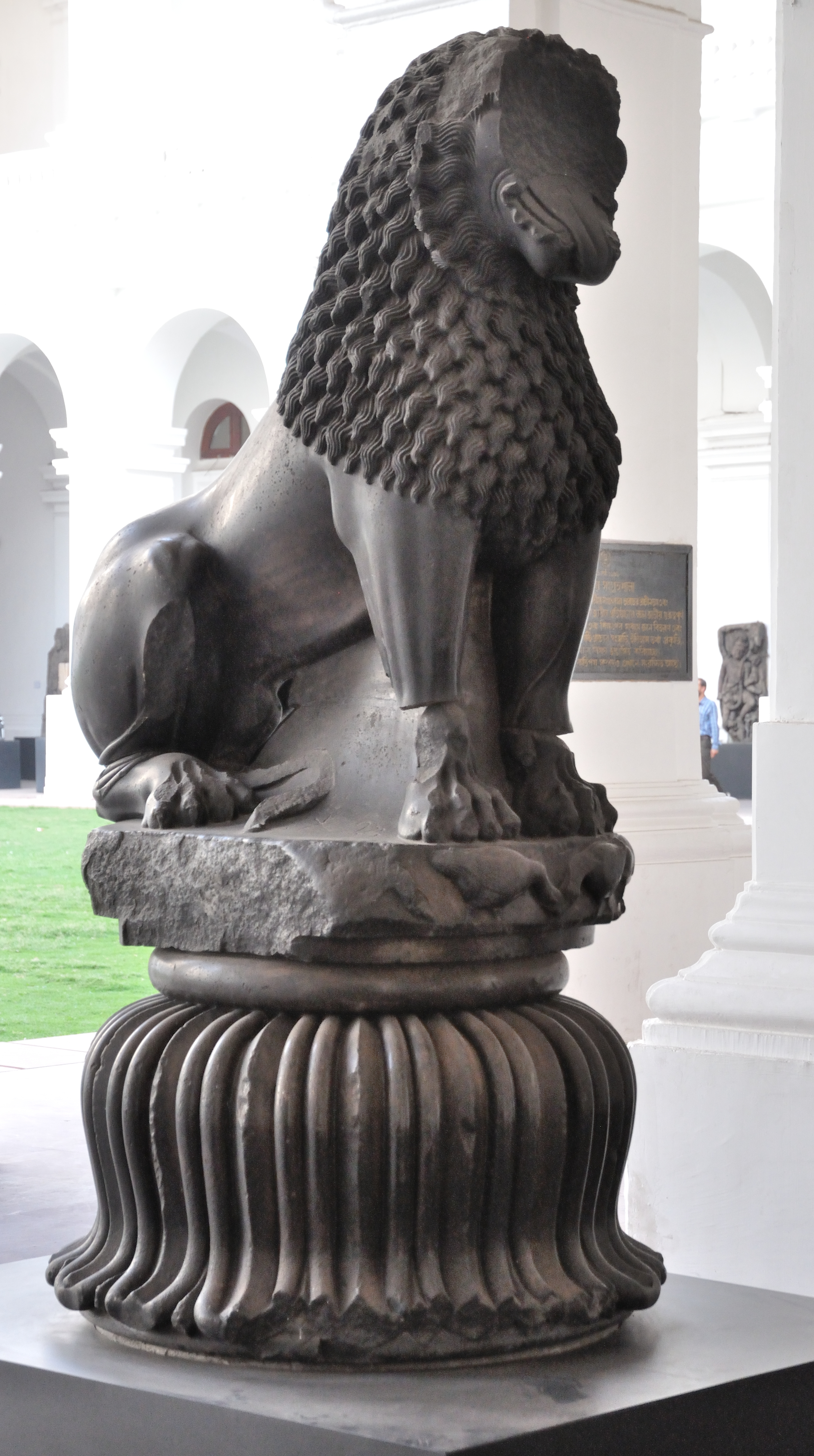
Rampurva lion. Polished.

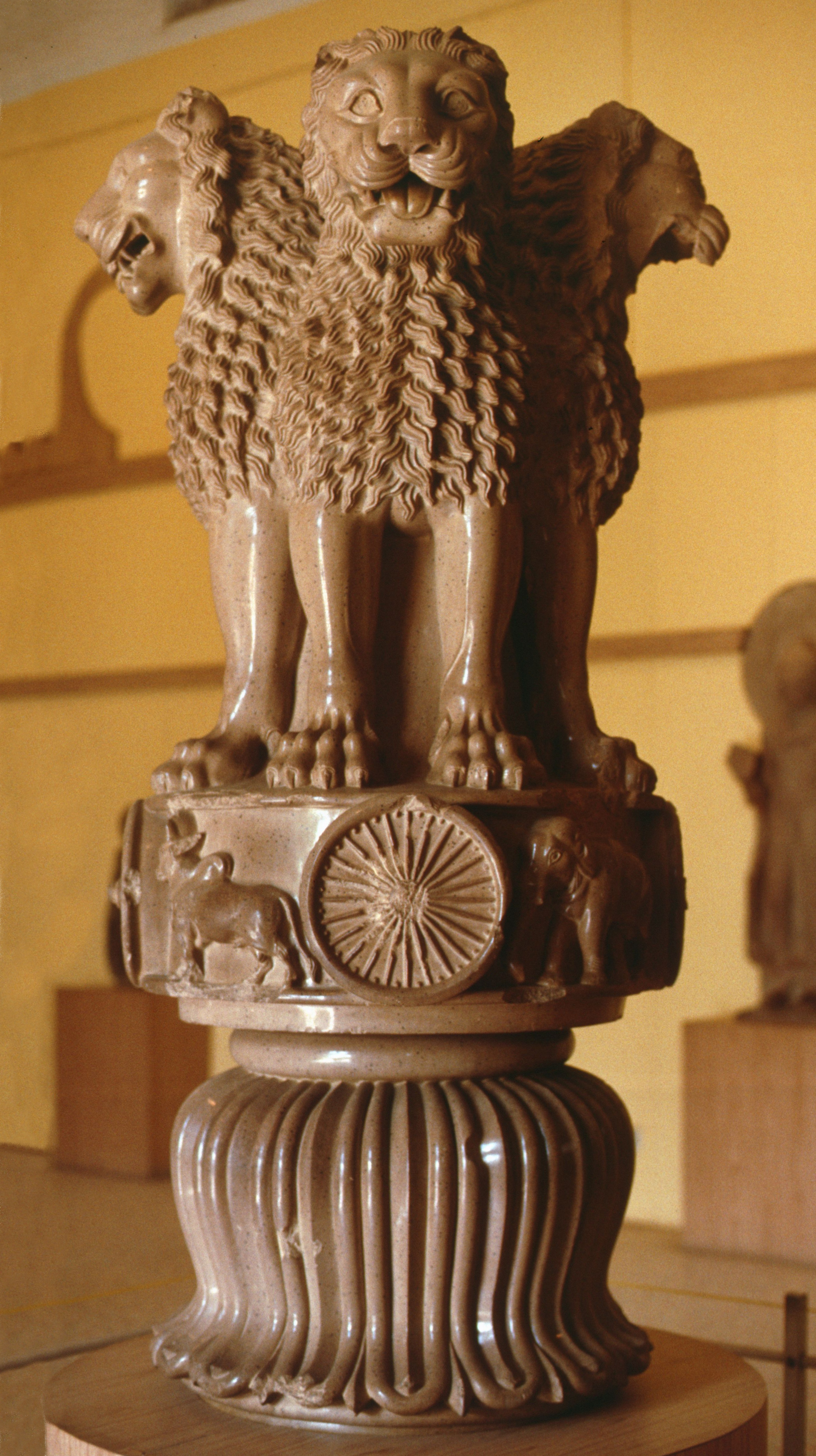
The "Lion Capital of Ashoka", from Sarnath. Polished.

== Mauryan statuary ==
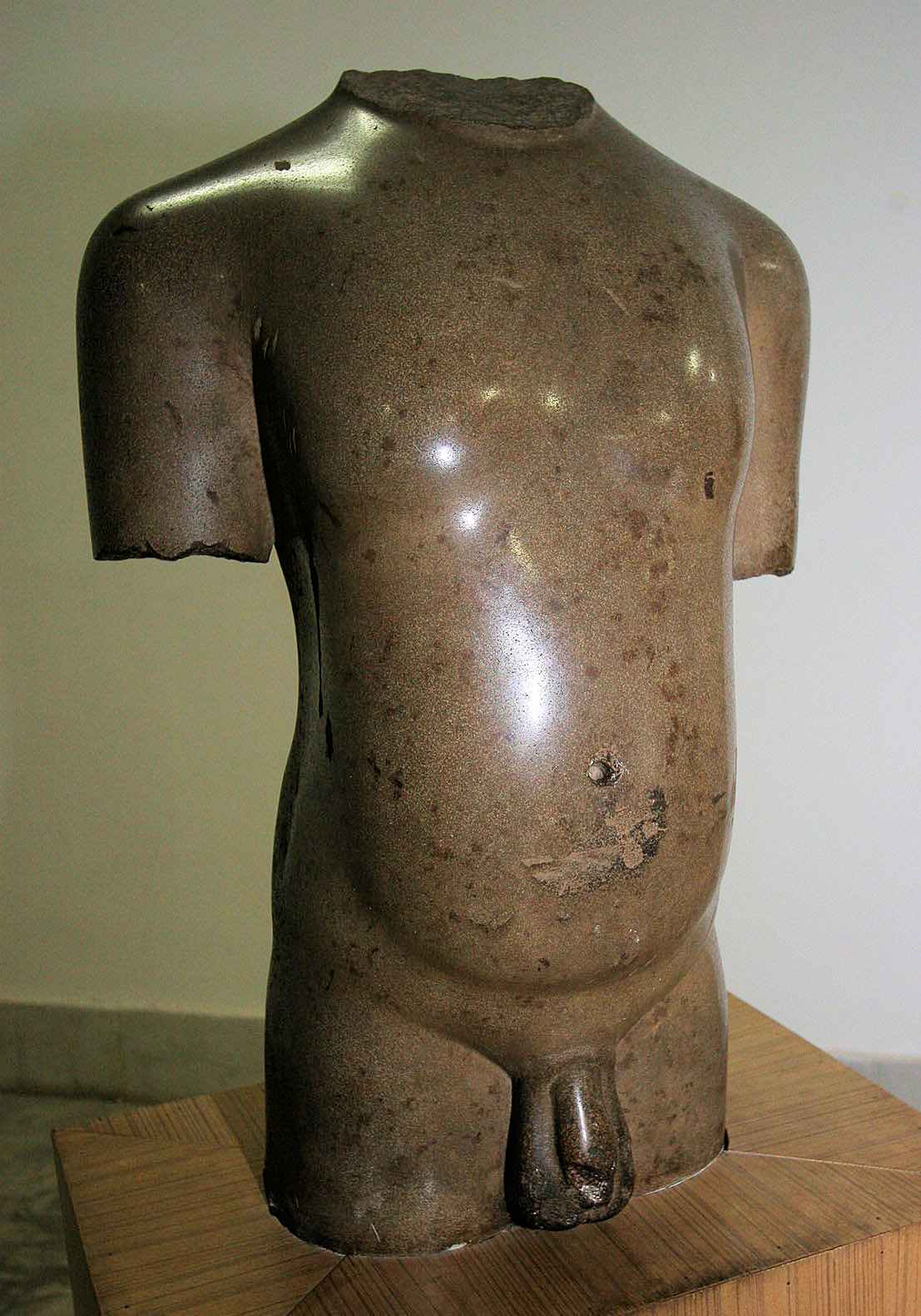
The Lohanipur torso, possibly a Jain Tirthankara, 3rd century BCE, discovered in Lohanipur, now in Patna Museum.

There are many examples of polished stone statuettes and artifacts from the Mauryan period. One of them, the Masarh lion, discovered near Patna, is special in that its style is nearly completely Achaemenid, which suggests a high level of artistic influence from Western Asia at the time the statuette was made.

The Masarh lion, discovered near Pataliputra and dated to the 3rd century BCE, is carved in sandstone of the Chunar type, like the Ashoka Pillars, and its finish is polished. The sculptural style is also indisputably Achaemenid This is particularly visible with the well-ordered tubular representation of whiskers (vibrissas), and the geometrical representation of inflated veins flush within the whole face. The mane on the other hand, with the tufts of hair represented in ripples, is rather naturalistic. According to SP Gupta, these stylistic characteristics can be described as non-Indian. Very similar examples of sculptures are known in Greece and in Persepolis. It is possible that this sculpture was made by an Achaemenid or Greek sculptor in India and either remained without effect, or was the Indian imitation of a Greek or Achaemenid model, somewhere between the 5th and the 1st century BCE, although it is generally dated from the time of the Maurya Empire, around the 3rd century BCE.

According to John Boardman, the lion sculpture of Marsarh is "quite Persian", although the treatment of the mane is rather of Greek naturalistic style and breaks with the rigid and codified style of the Achaemenid Empire. For him, the lions of the Lion Capital of Ashoka at Sarnath represent the next logical and artistic step, and would be the realization of Hellenistic Greek artists to soften and give more naturality to Persian style.

There are also a few examples of polished statuary, all dated to the Mauryan period, such as the polished sculpture of a head from Sarnath.

The Diamond throne of Bodhgaya is another example. It was established by Ashoka at Bodh Gaya and also exhibits the characteristic Mauryan polish.

Polished ringstones are variously said to be Mauryan or Sunga, dating ranging for the 3rd century BCE to the 1st century BCE.

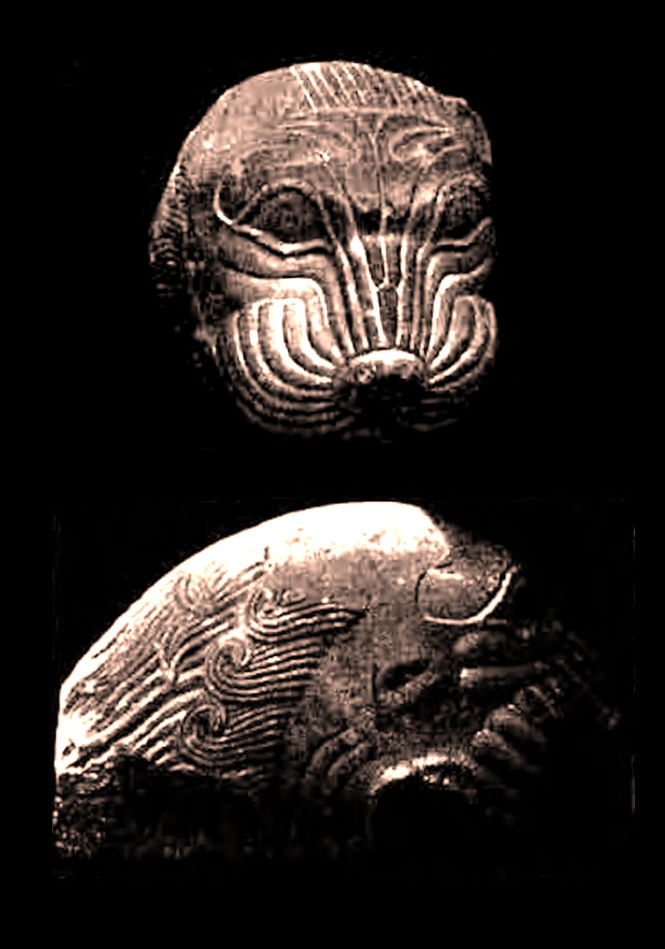
The Masarh lion, another example of Mauryan polish. A modern photograph .

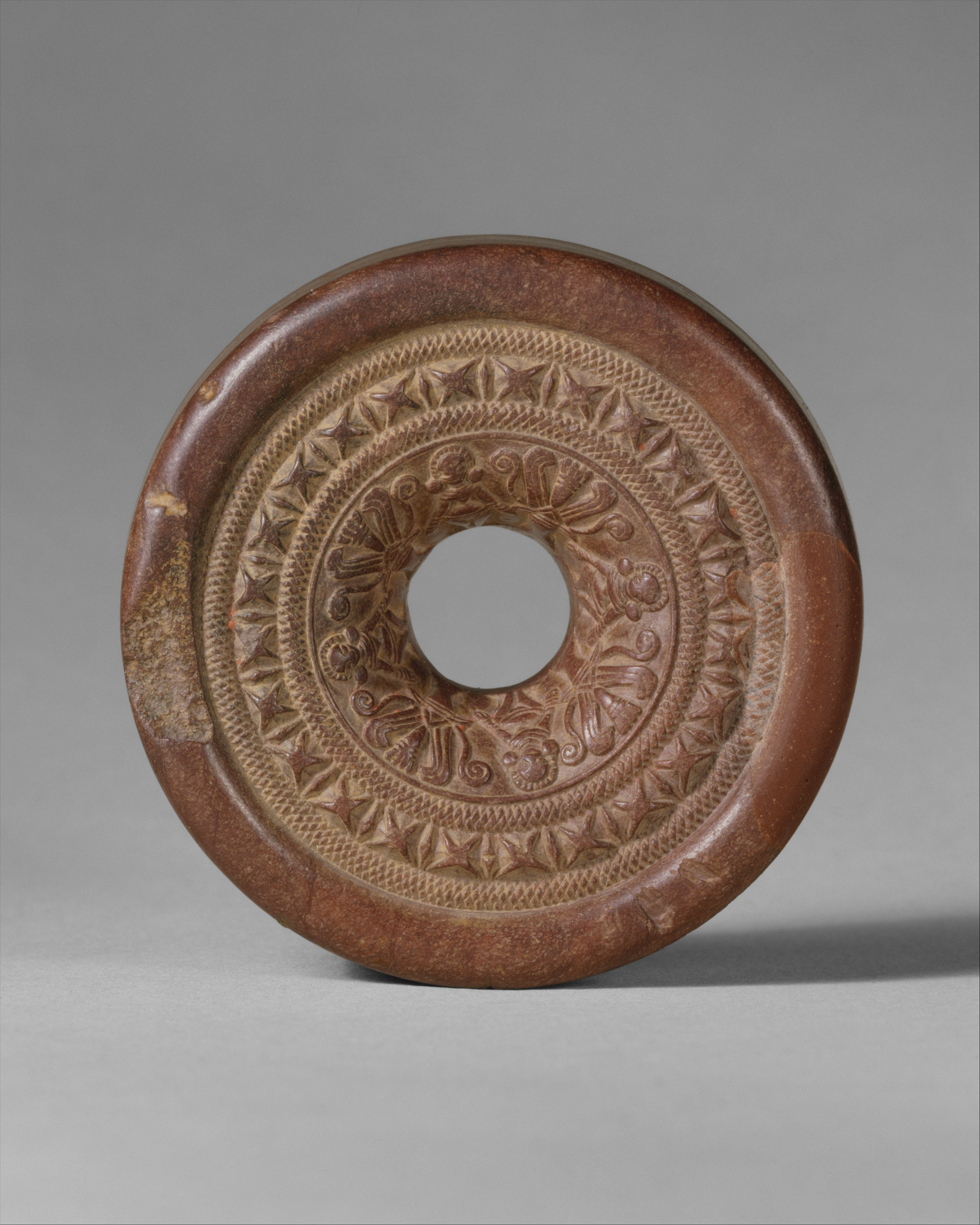
Polished ringstones are variously said to be Mauryan or Sunga, dating ranging for the 3rd century BCE to the 1st century BCE.

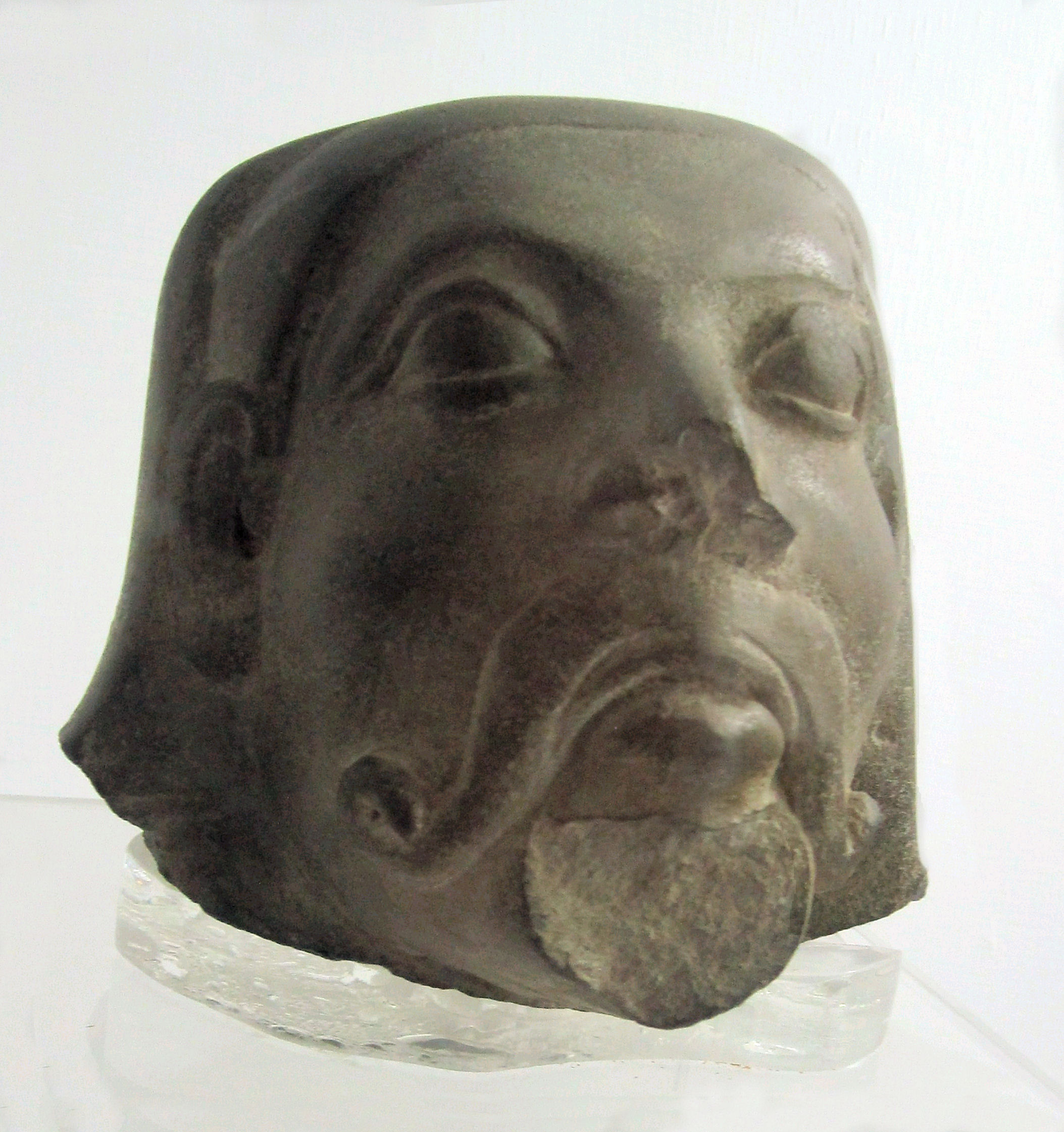
Polished sculpture of a head, Sarnath, Maurya period.

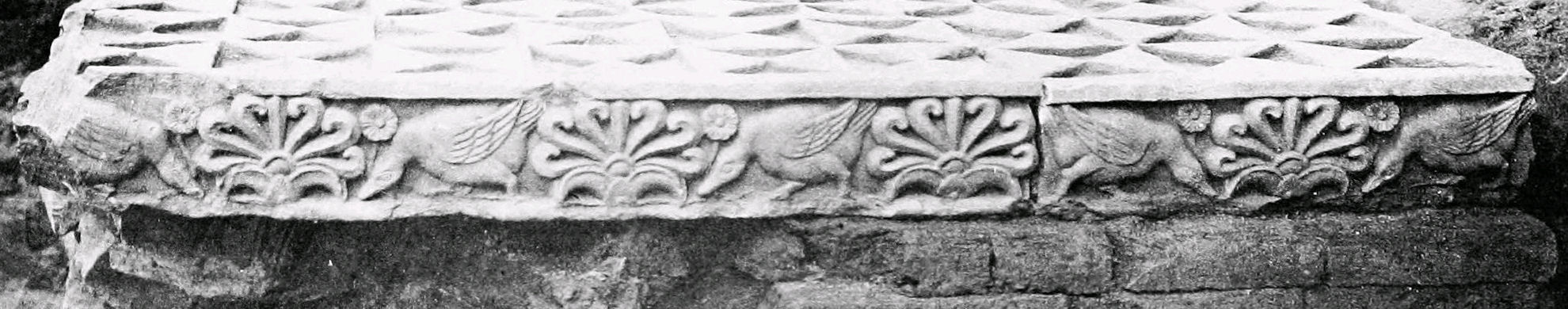
The polished surface of the Diamond throne.

== Didarganj Yakshi ==
The Didarganj Yakshi is generally considered as one of the finest examples of Mauryan art. Alternatively, it is rather dated to the 2nd century CE, based on the analysis of shape and ornamentation. According to some art historians, the treatment of the forelock in particular is said to be characteristically Kushan.

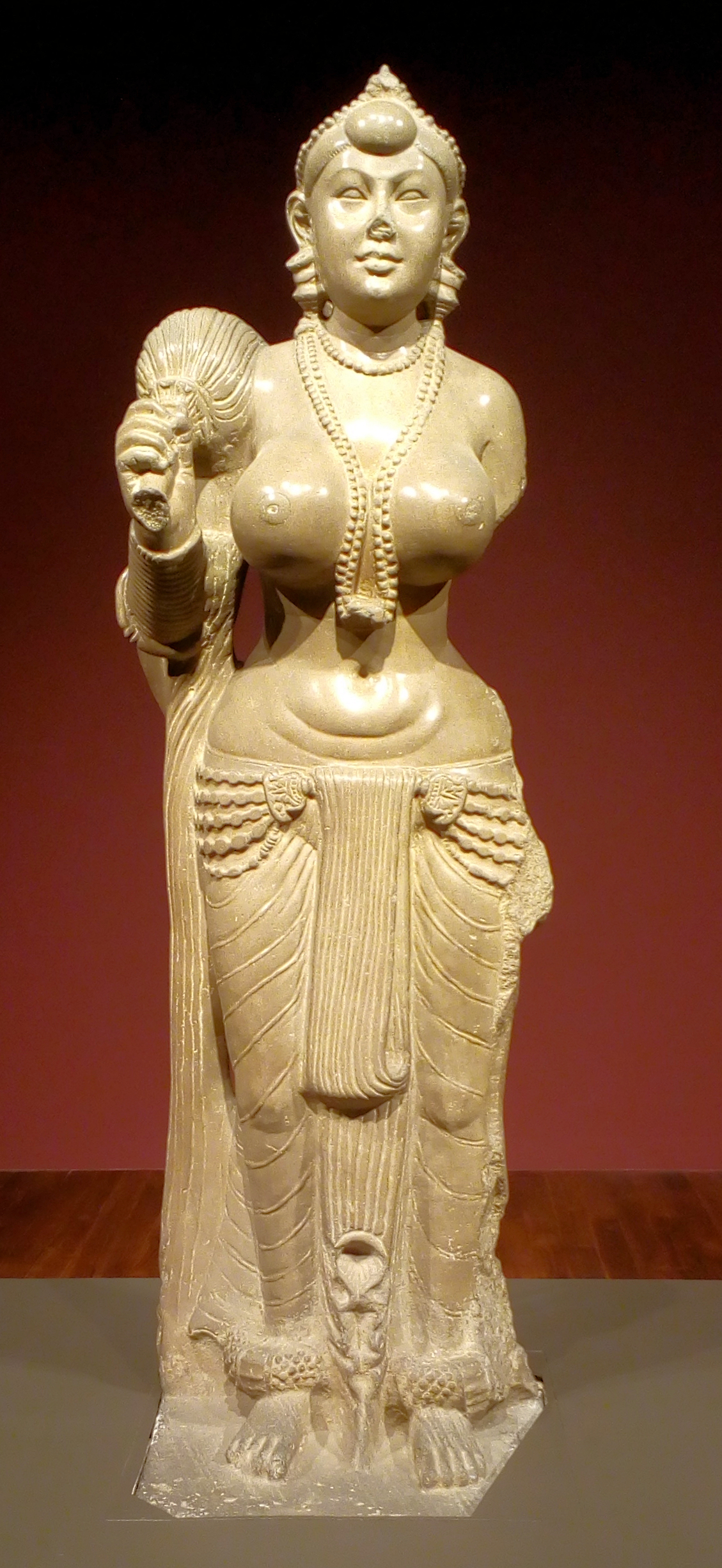
The Didarganj Yakshi, generally dated to Mauryan periods 3rd century BC while some date it to Kushan period

== Post-Mauryan near abandonment of polishing techniques ==
After the Mauryan period, the general sculptural trend is towards the complete abandon of polishing techniques. This may be due to the high cost involved with polishing. The end of the Mauryan period marked the end of imperial patronage of the arts, which tended to be financed by the people or the wealthy merchant class thereafter. There are however a few important cases of polishing that seem to subsist.

The Parkam Yaksha "Manibhadra" is made of polished grey sandstone, in the same material as the Pillars of Ashoka. This statue is generally dated to the 3rd-1st centuries BCE, and may be immediately post-Mauryan. It may be a transitional from the Mauryan period to next period including the reliefs of Bharhut, presenting some continuity in the finishing technique, but a real fracture in terms of sculptural style.

The Didarganj Yakshi, although claimed by some as an example of Mauryan art is generally dated to the 2nd century CE, based on the analysis of shape and ornamentation. This life-size standing image is tall, well-proportioned, free-standing sculpture is made of sandstone with well polished surface. This statue, if the 2 century CE date is upheld, would suggest that polishing technique in fact did not disappear with the Mauryas, but remained in India, and was simply little used, possibly because of the high labor and cost involved.

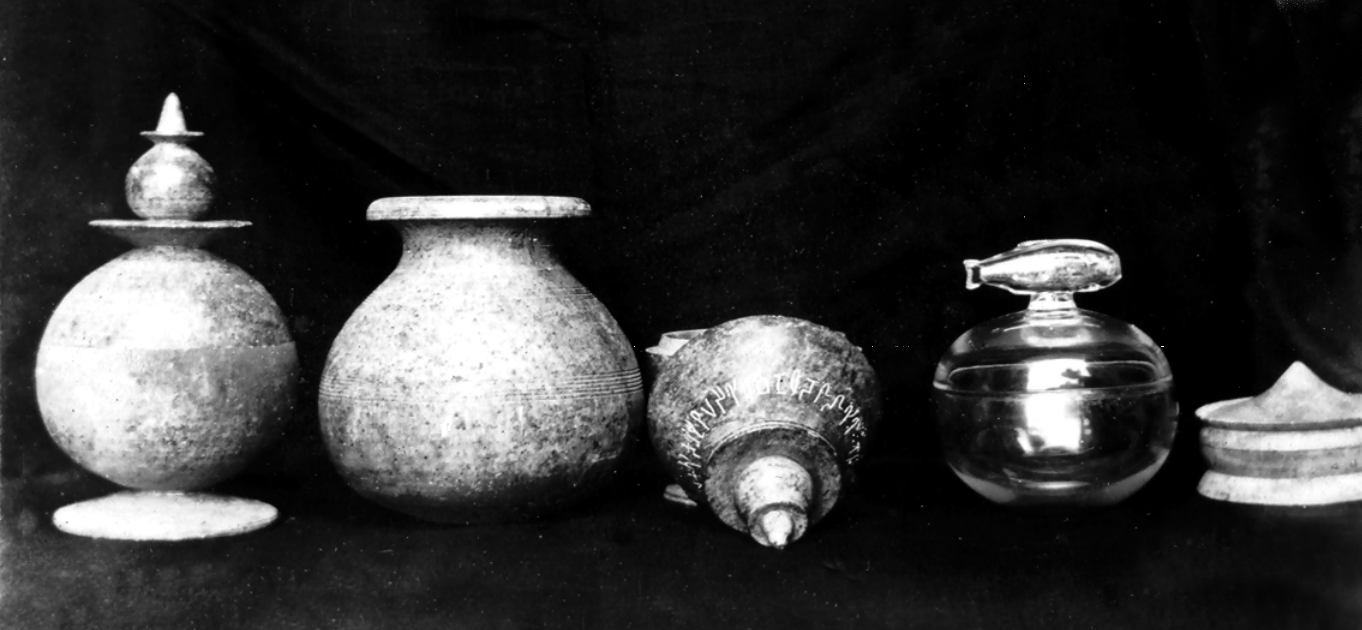
Reliquaries discovered at Piprahwa stupa, 2nd century BCE.

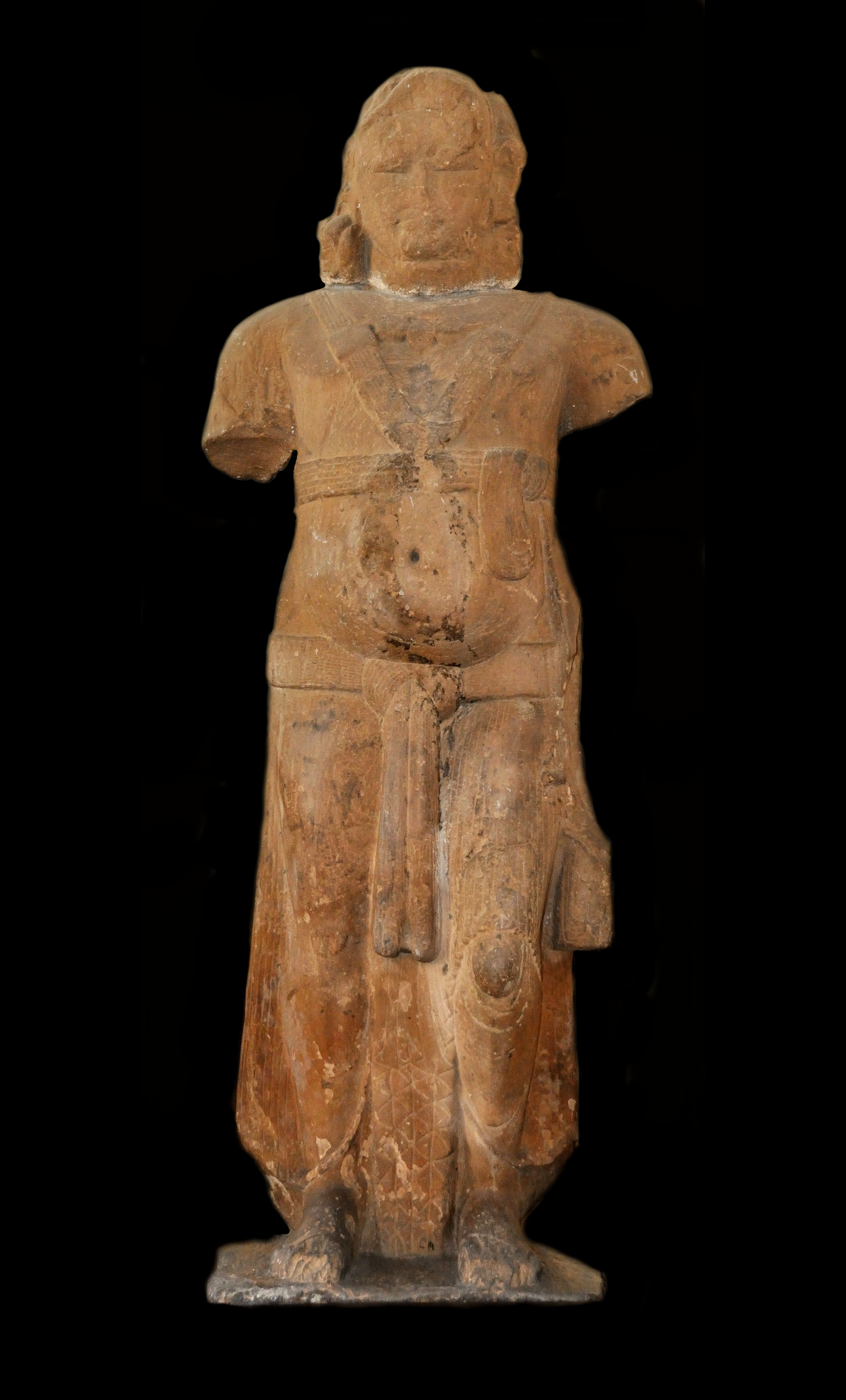
The Parkam Yaksha "Manibhadra", polished grey sandstone, same material as Ashoka pillars. 3rd-1st centuries BCE, possibly immediately post-Mauryan.

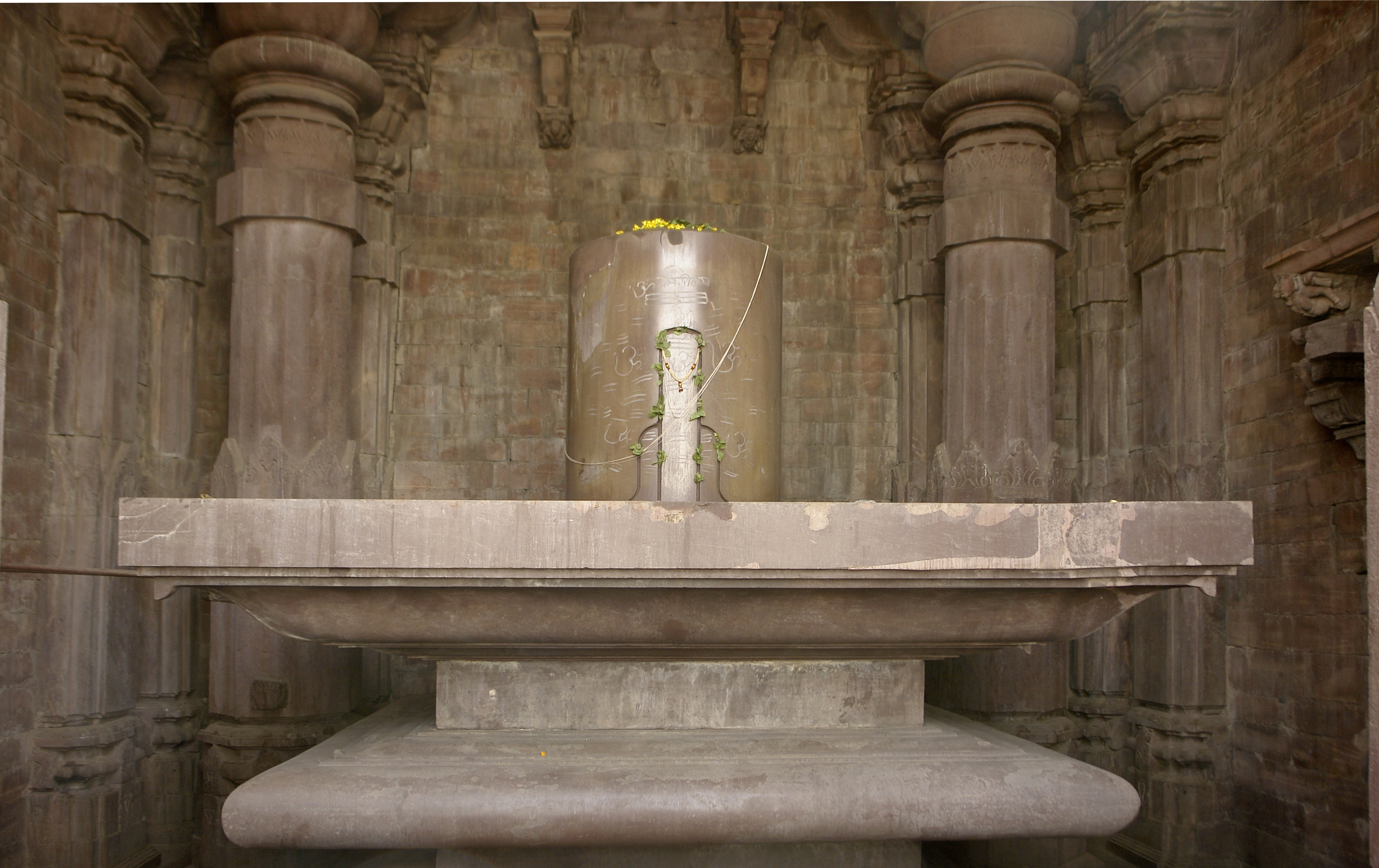
Bhojpur temple linga 11th century AD

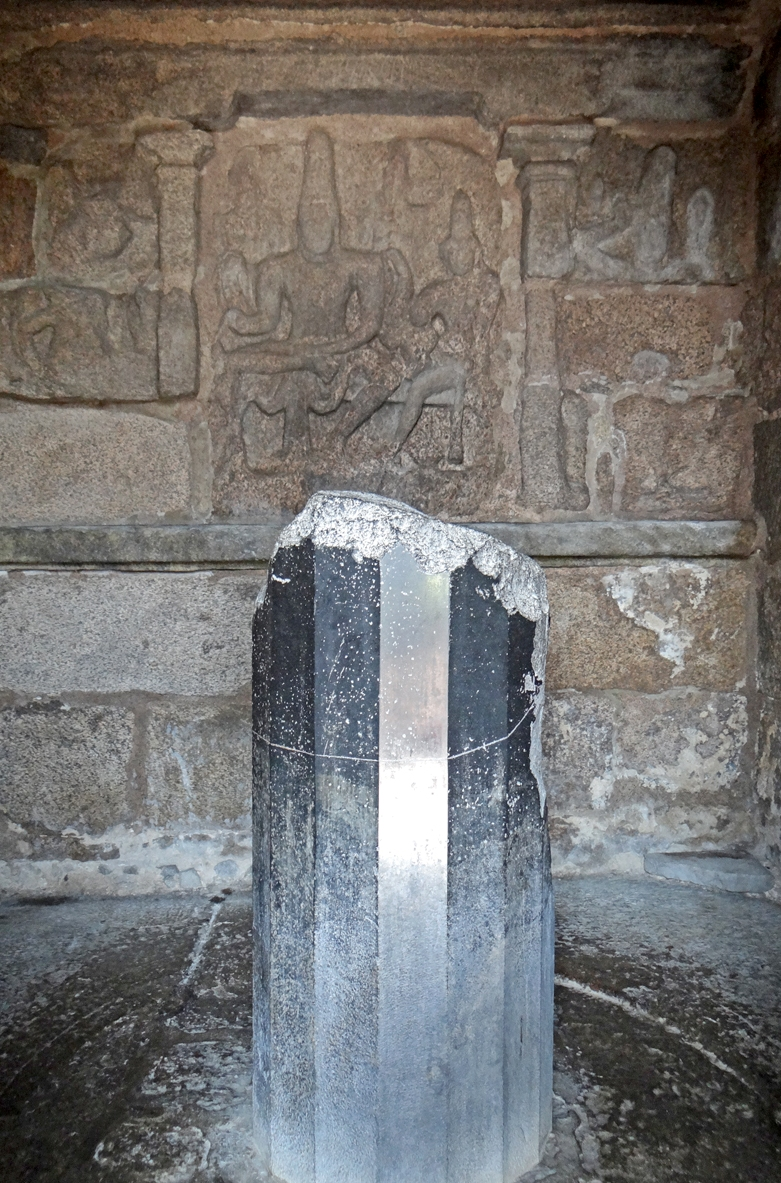
Polygonal Lingam in shore temple 8th century

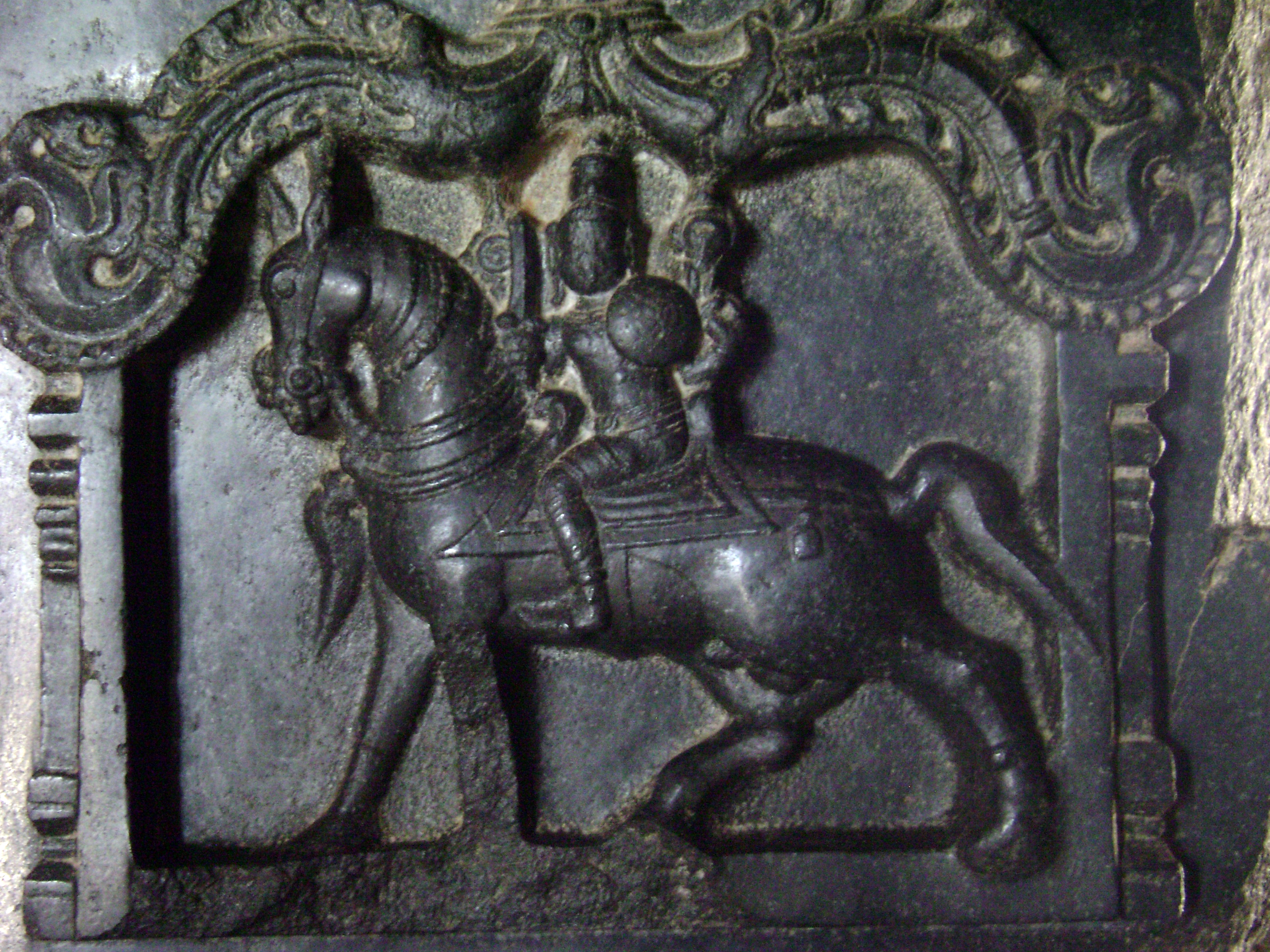
Hazararama temple polished granite pillar hampi 15th century

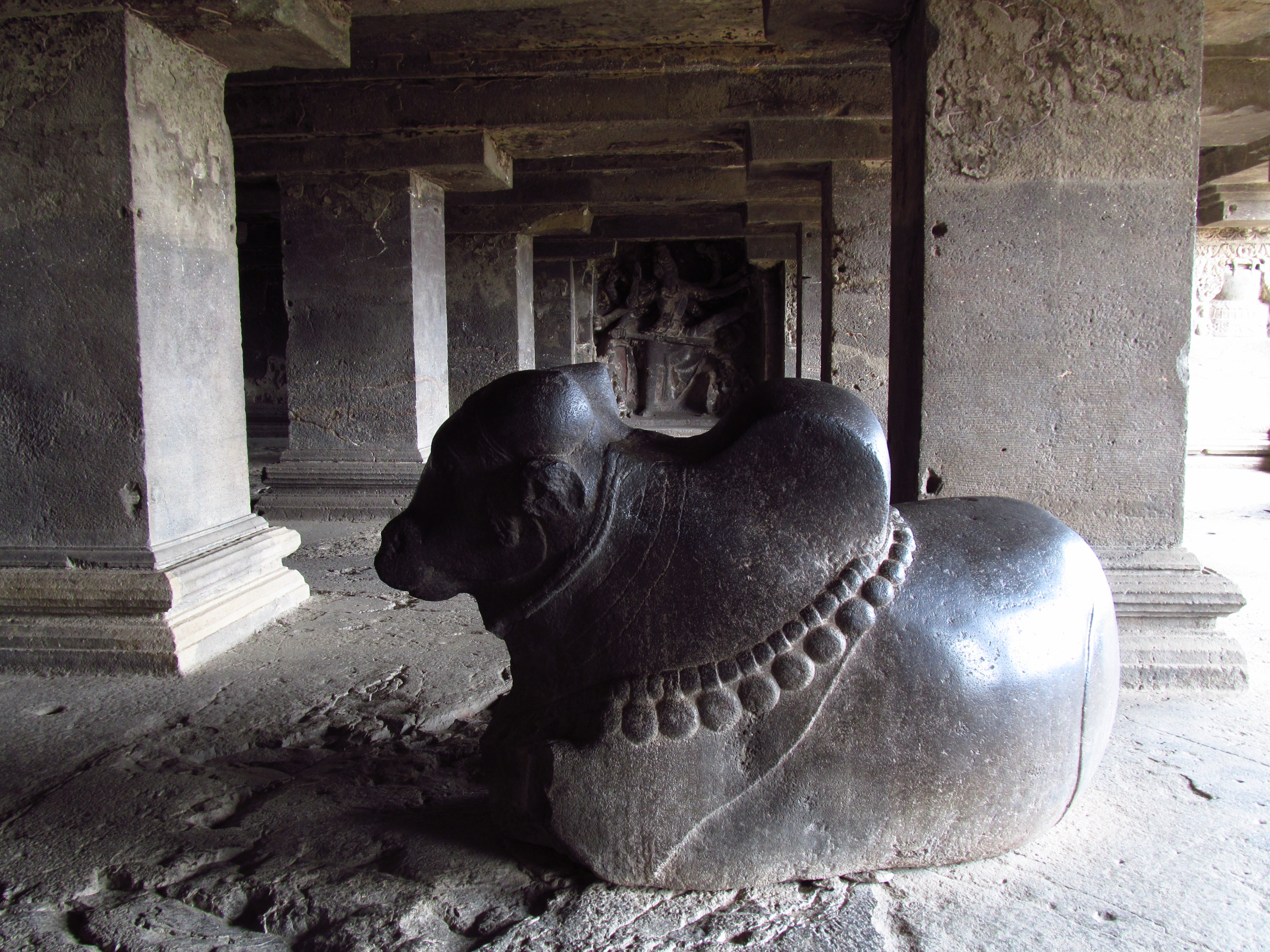
Ellora cave 15 polished nandi 8th-10th century AD

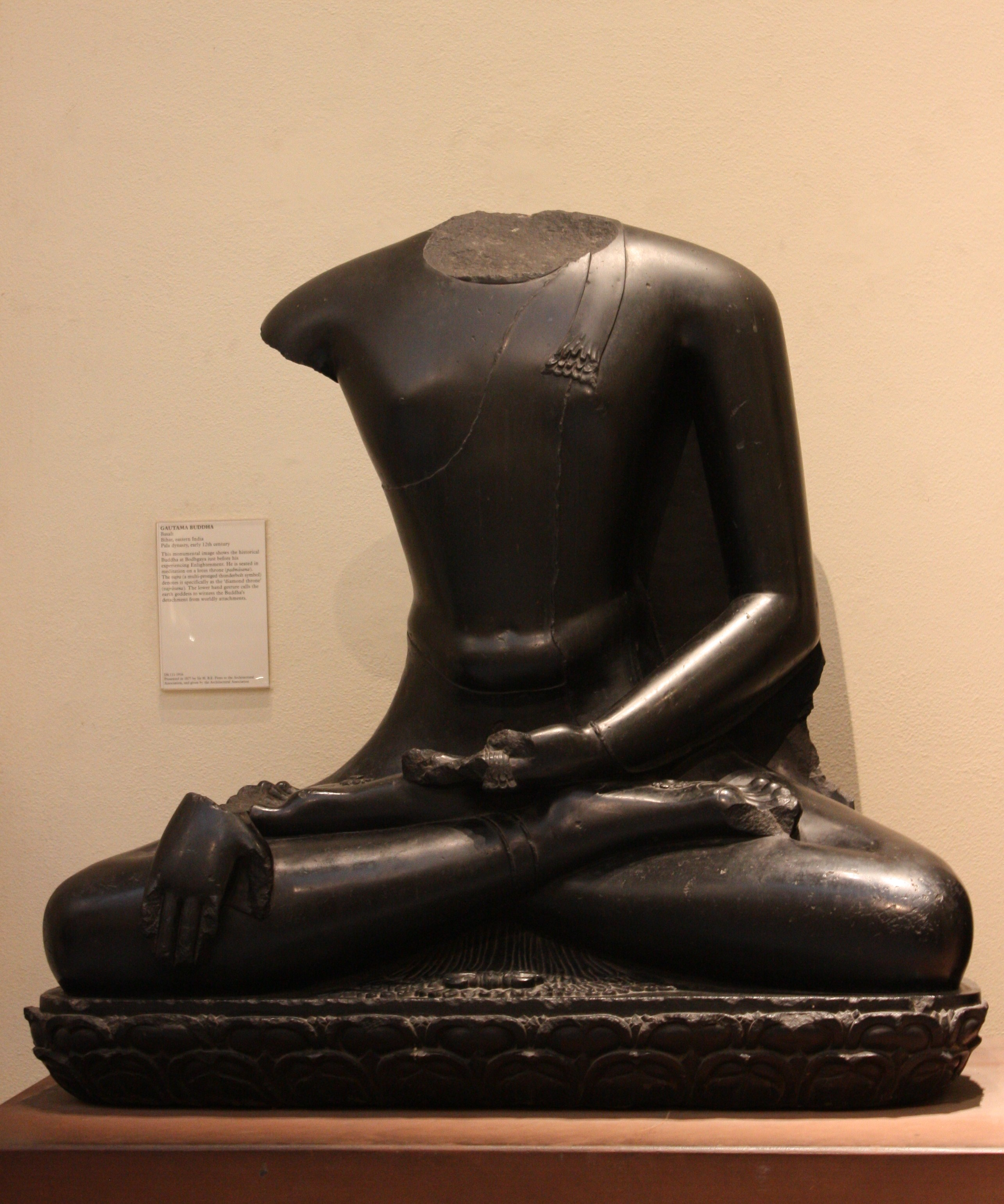
Pala dynasty 12th century

== Debate on Achaemenid vs Pre-Mauryan origins ==
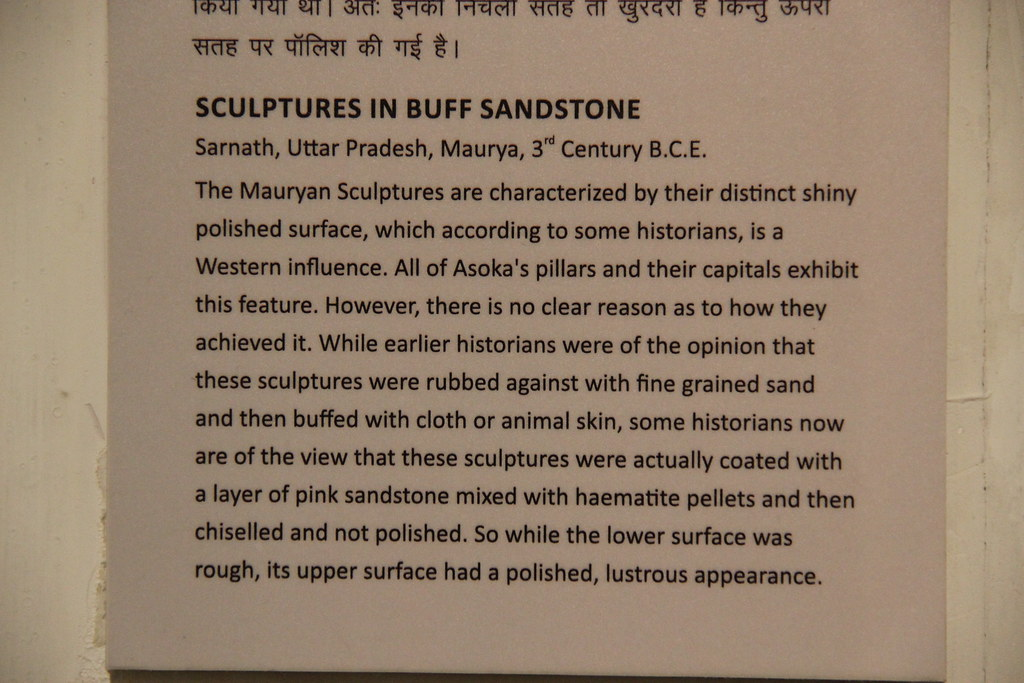
Types of polish and coating techniques Mauryans may have used.

Achaemenid sculptural art was often characterized by a great level of polishing of the stone (usually sandstone, a very soft material), and it is thought that this polishing influenced the Maurya polishing, as is visible in the architecture of the columns of Pataliputra. Stones and polishing grains have been found in the ruins of Persepolis. These polishing techniques were also used by the Greeks, who used the natural Naxos emery grains.

It is believed that the stone-making techniques employed by the Mauryas may have derived from the techniques of Achaemenid statuary, stone-working and polishing techniques having spread to India after the destruction of the empire by Alexander the Great in 330 BCE and the displacement of Persian and Perso-Greek artists and technicians.

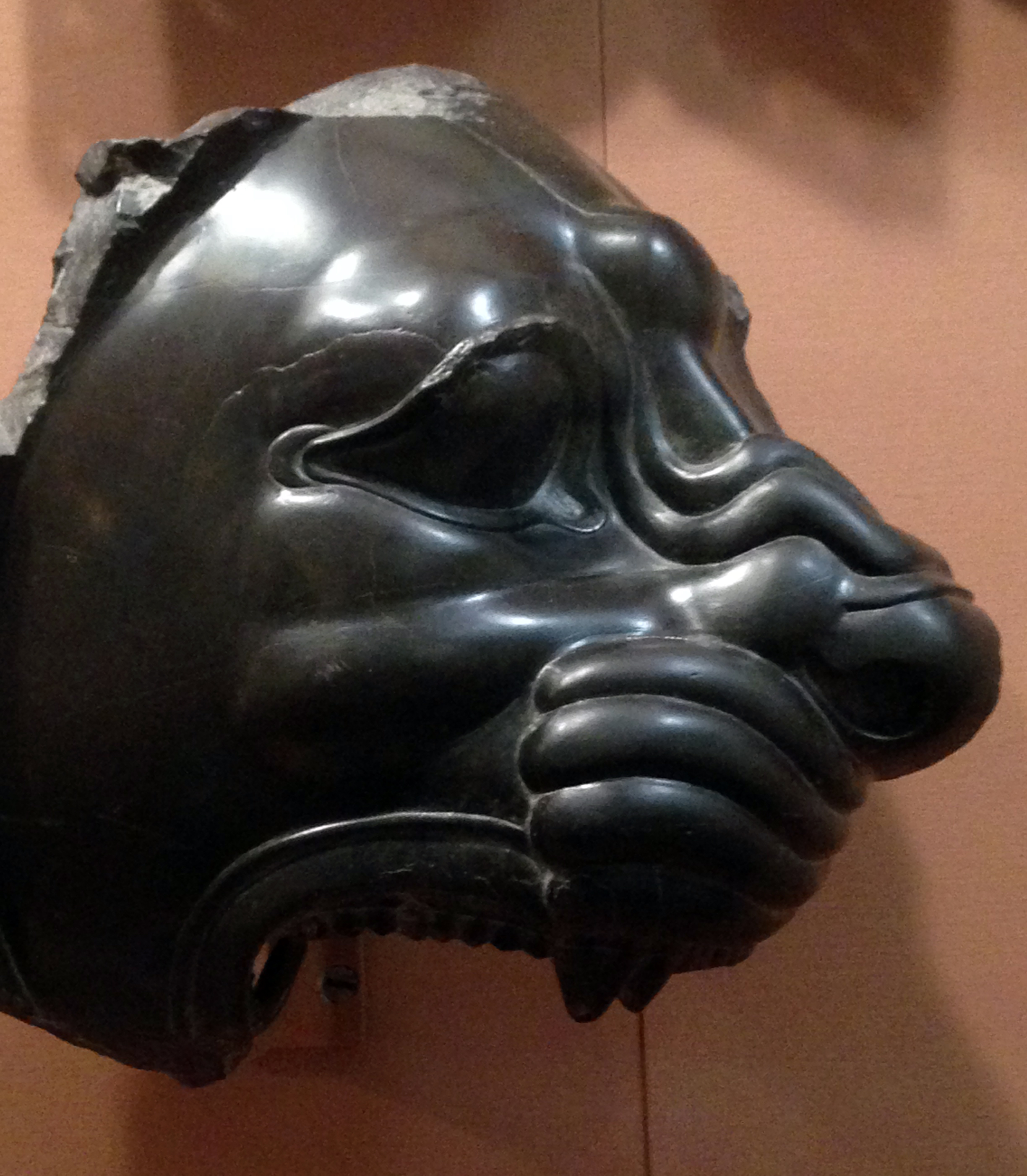
Lion Fragment, Persepolis, Iran. Sandstone. 550-330 BCE.

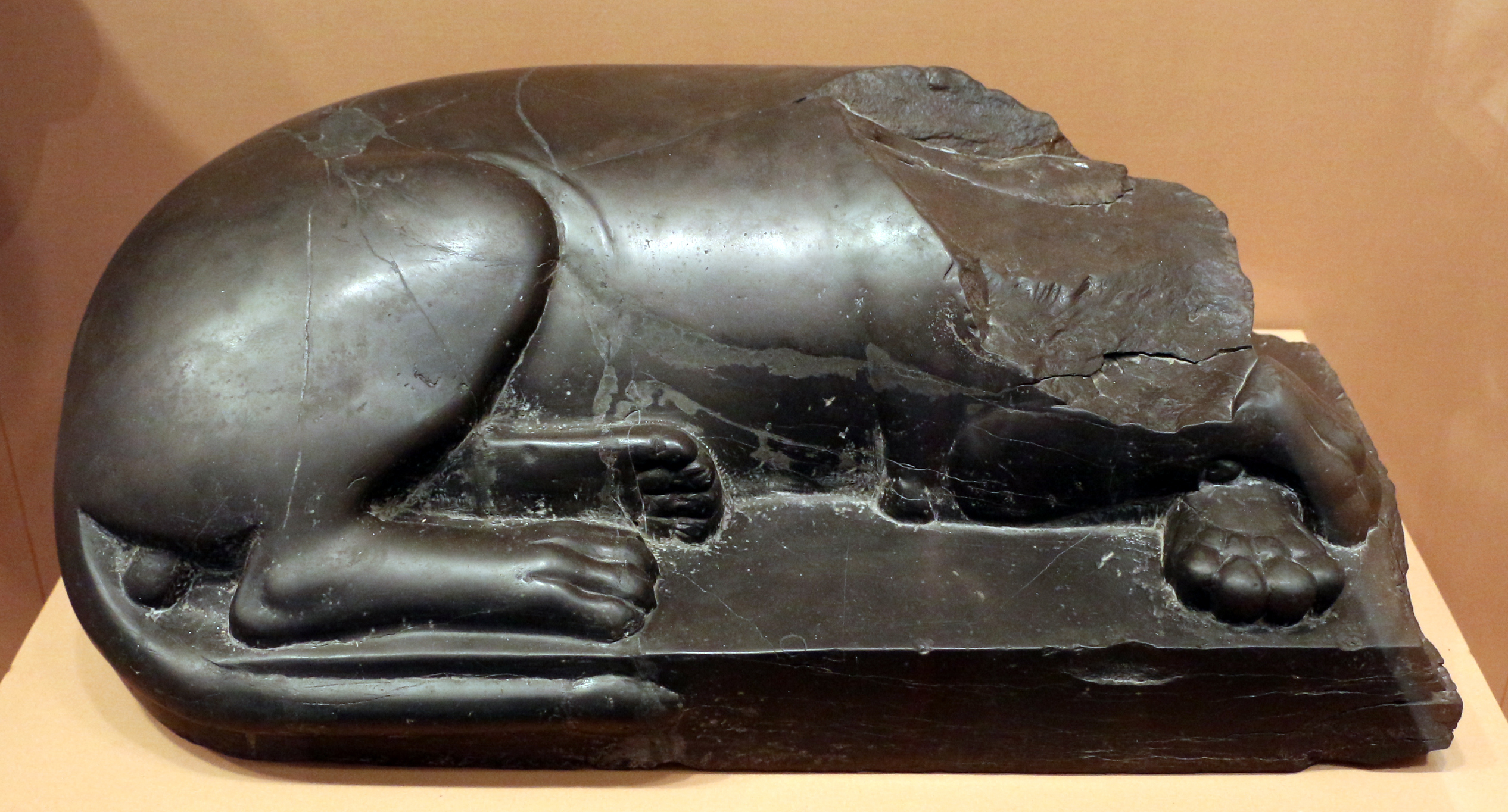
Achaemenid feline, Persepolis, 486-465 BCE

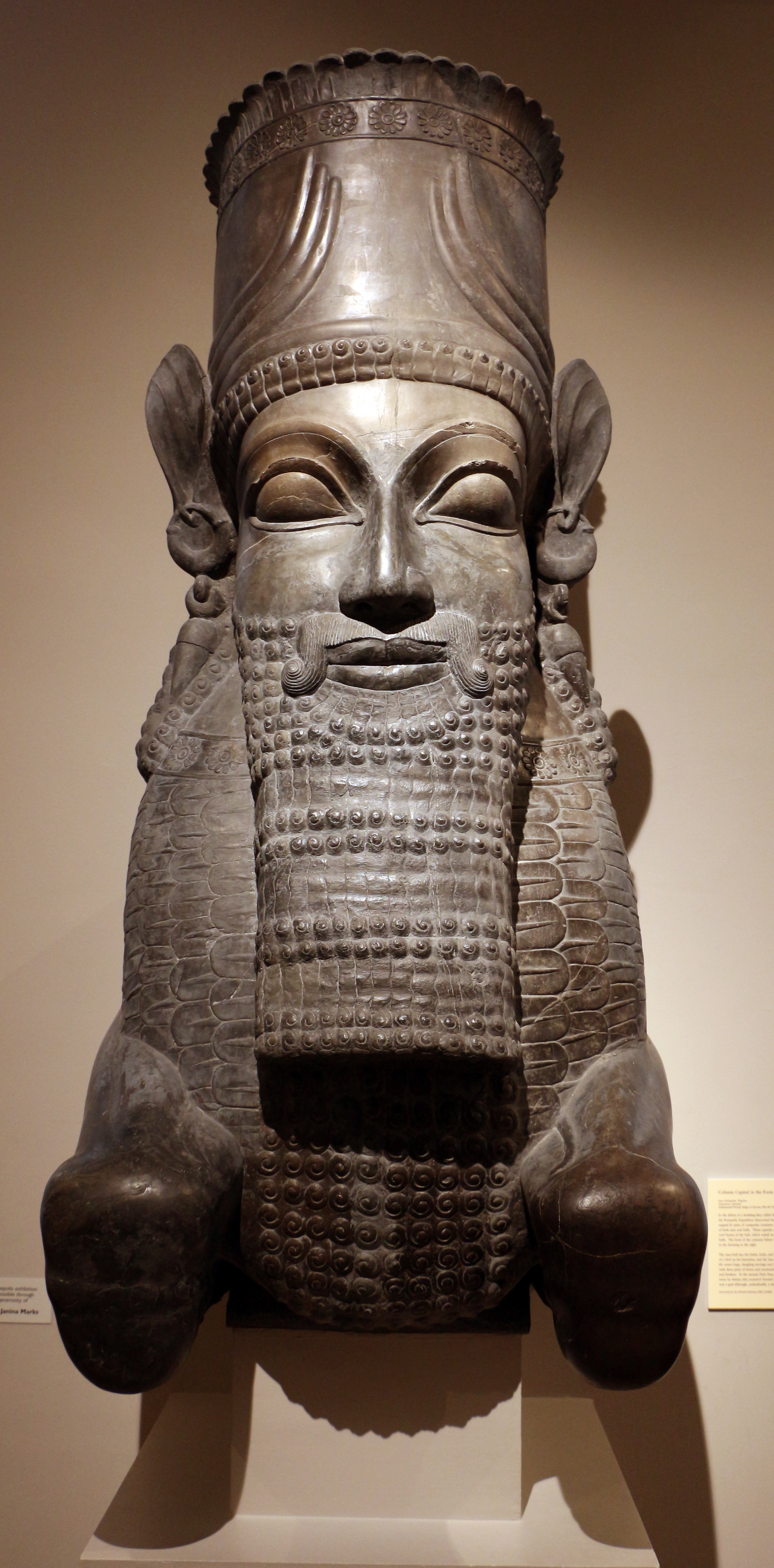
Achaemenid sculpture, Persepolis, 486-465 BCE

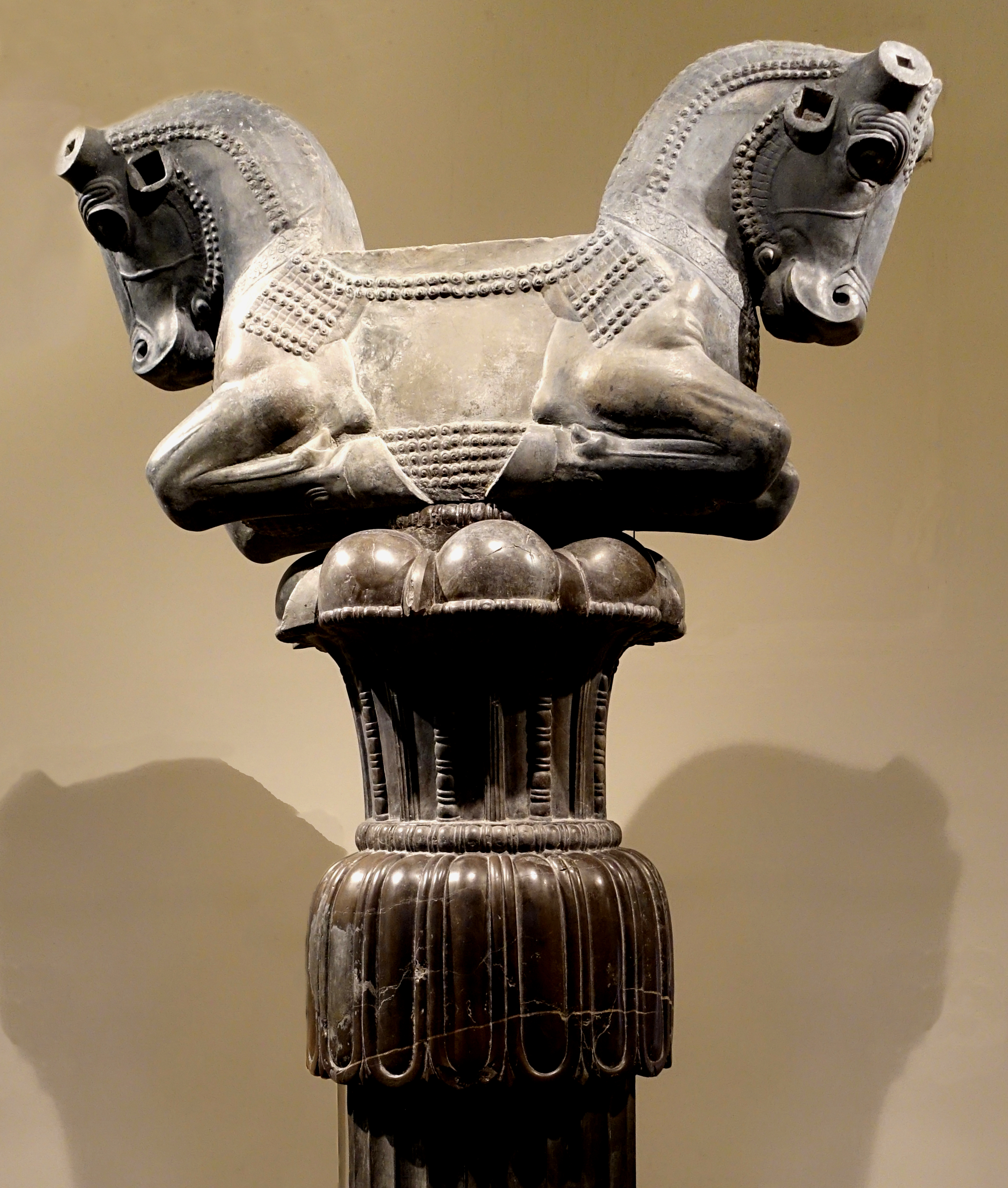
Highly polished Achaemenid capital.

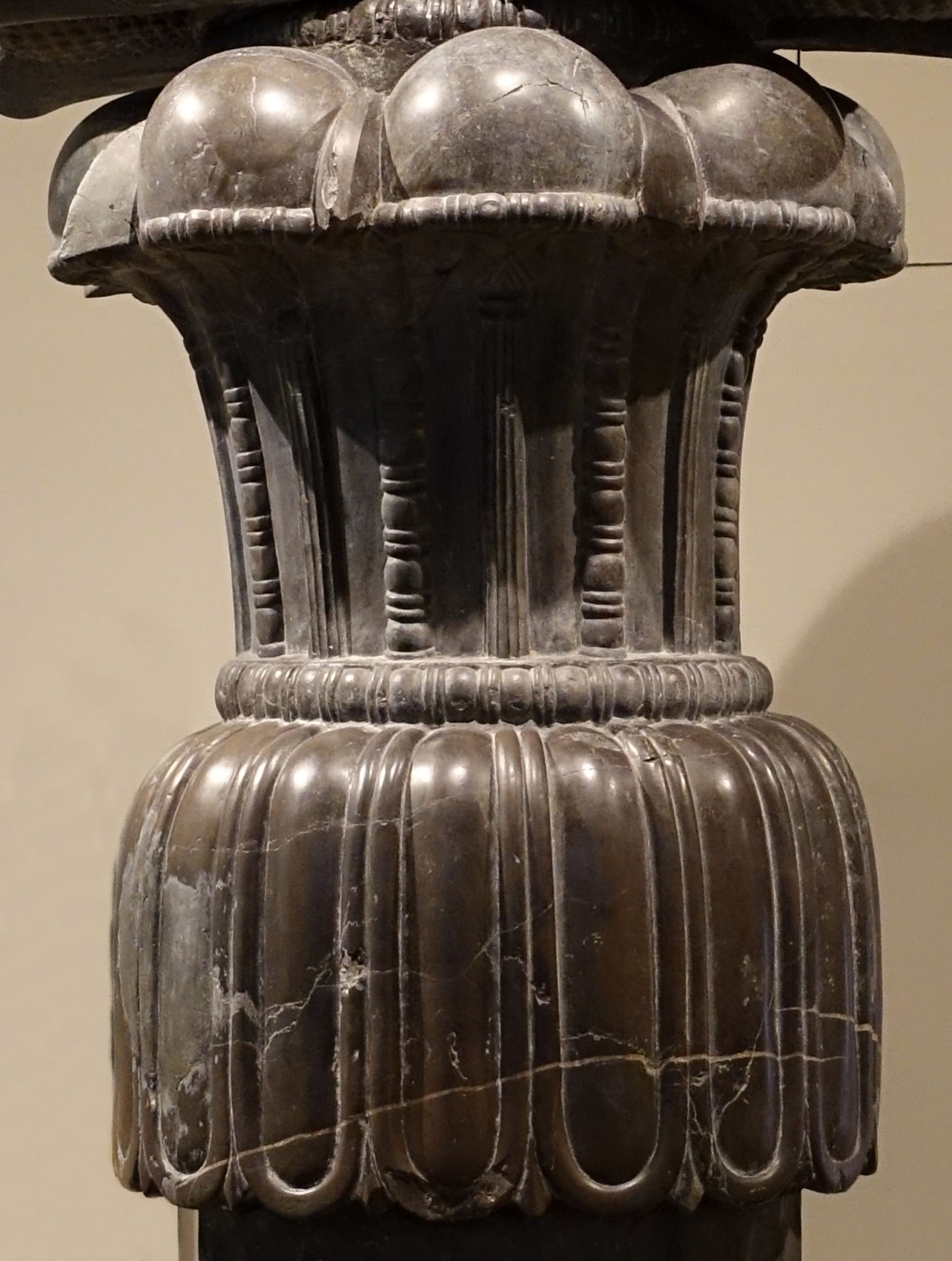
Polished Achaemenid pillar capital (detail).

According to Gupta, the polishing of rocks could have a local origin. He invokes the existence of polishing technologies of the Neolithic, visible in various stone tools such as axes. According to Gupta, the Son Bhandar Caves could be such an intermediate stage, relatively unique, and subject to questioning its chronology, since it is generally dated to the 2nd-4th centuries CE. The polish was achieved by application of agate burnisher which was later applied on pillars and sandstone objects. Some examples of Indus Valley Civilisation statuary (Harappa, Mohenjo-daro, circa 3000-2000 BCE) do show a certain level of polishing.

Pataliputra Voussoir fragment made of granite stone discovered by K. P Jayaswal had Mauryan polish but was dated to pre-Mauryan Nanda period due to three archaic Brahmi letters which paleographically appeared before Mauryan period Brahmi. The voussoir has been analyzed to be part a of trefoil arch which decorated a torana gate.

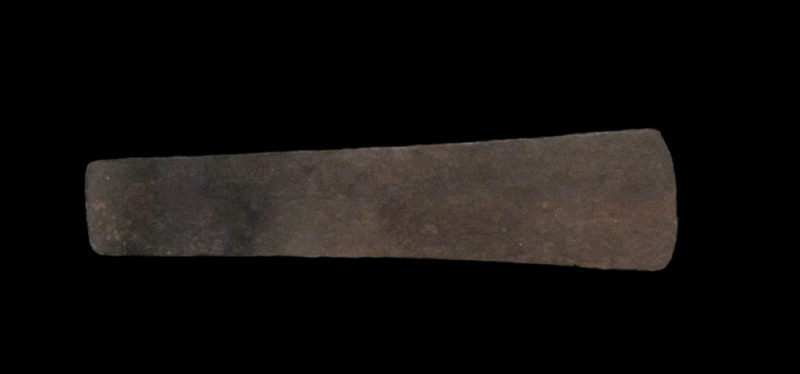
Polished stone ax, India, 2800 BCE-

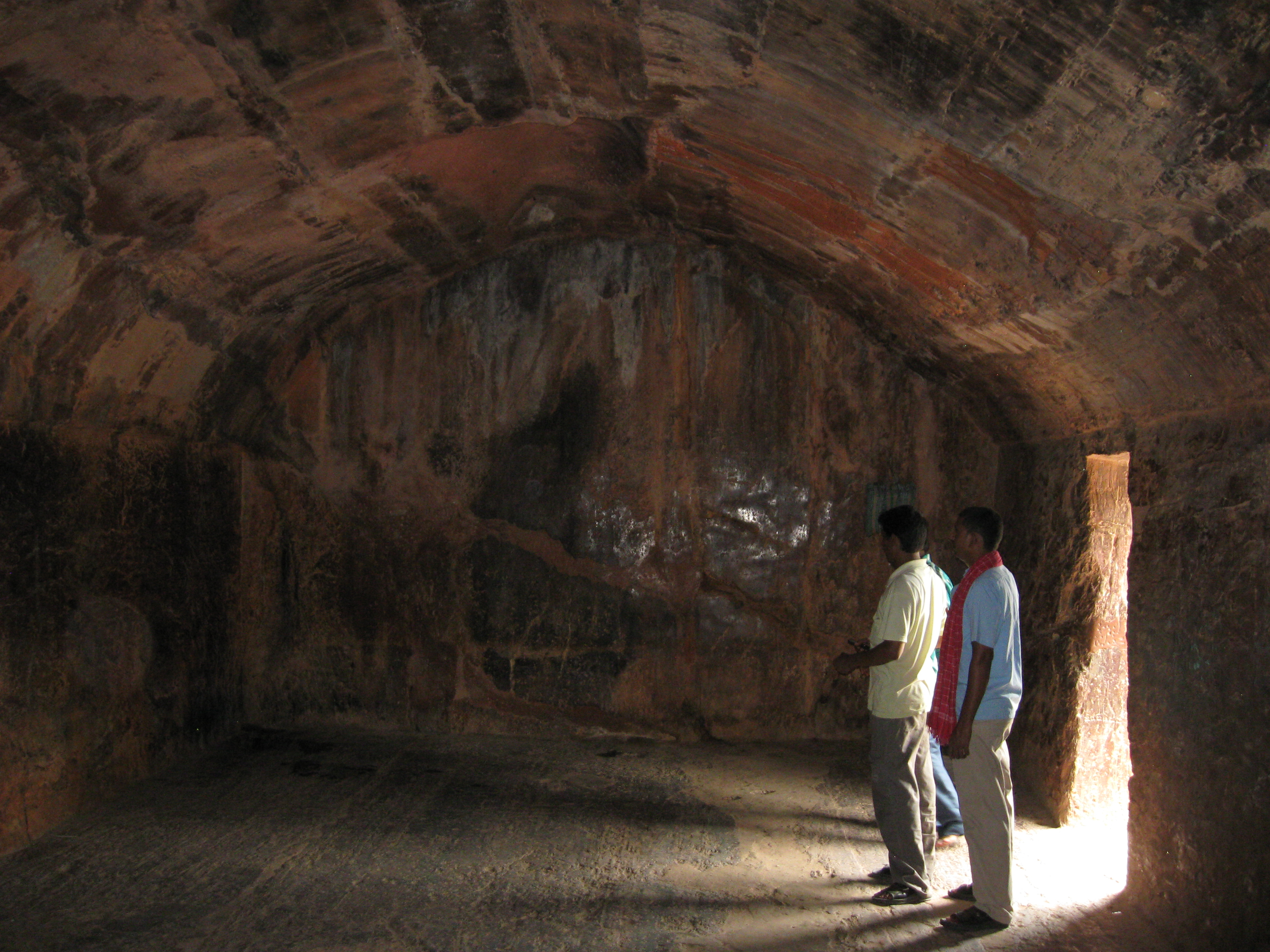
Son Bhandar Cave with some polish, 2nd-4th centuries CE. Possibly pre-Mauryan according to Gupta.

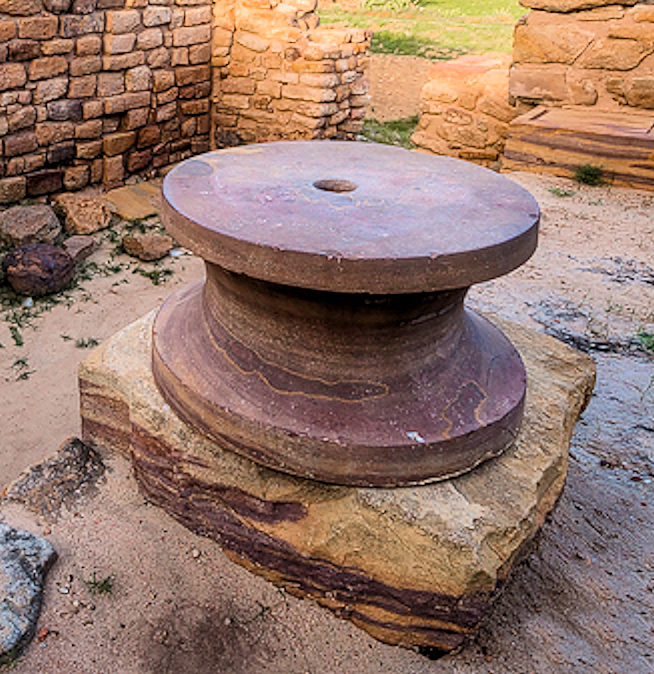
Polished pillar base, Dholavira, circa 3000-2000 BCE.

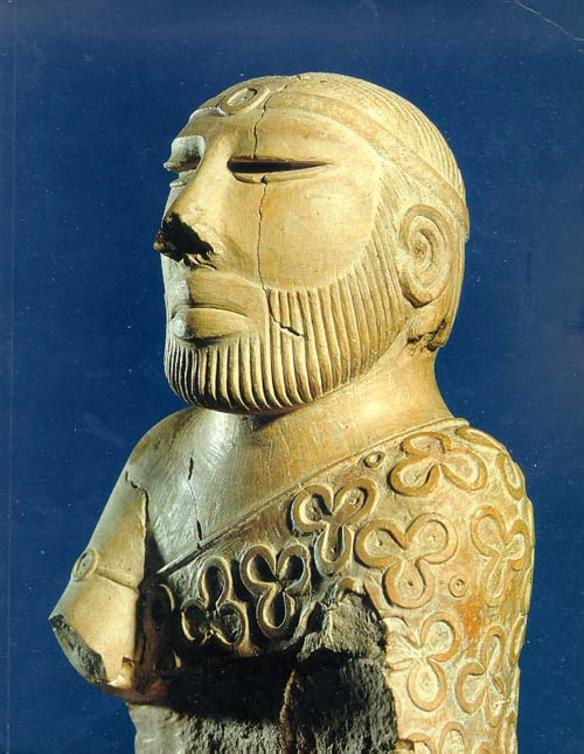
Mohenjo-daro priest king polished statue.

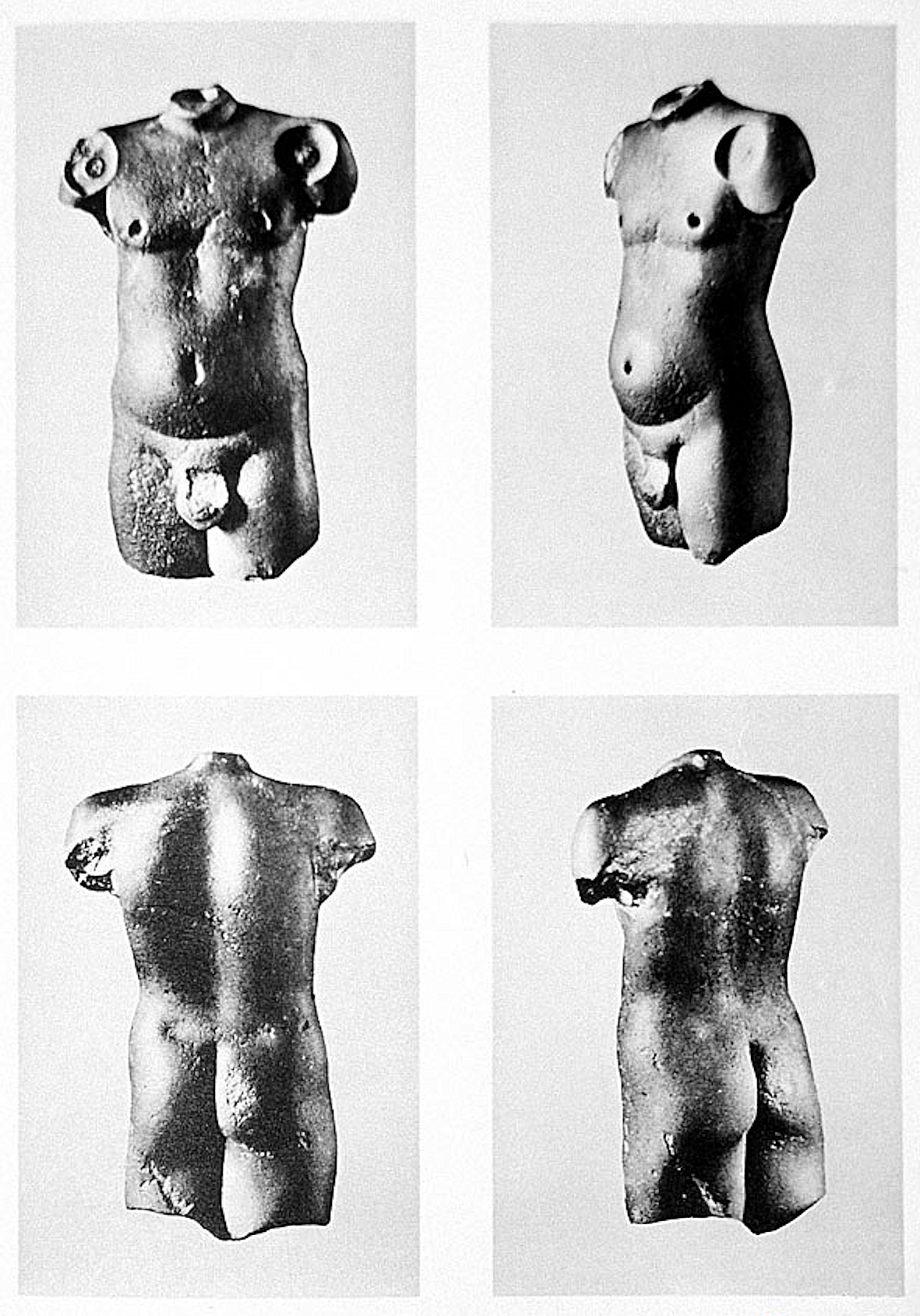
Harappa male torso, polished stone, possibly circa 2300-1750 BCE.

== See also ==
- Hellenistic influence on Indian art
