= History Today (disambiguation) =

- History Today, an illustrated magazine published monthly in London since 1951
- the journal of the Indian History and Culture Society
- History Today a comedy sketch, see The Mary Whitehouse Experience or Newman and Baddiel in Pieces
