= Indian Archaeological Society =

The Indian Archaeological Society (IAS) was registered in 1968 at Varanasi as a non-governmental, non-profit making professional organization of archaeologists, founded by A. K. Narain and other Archaeologists and Indologists.

As of 2007, the society has some 400 members and is registered in New Delhi as an educational and charitable Institution.

Its bulletin Purātattva has been appearing since its foundation, originally edited by A.K. Narain, M. Seshadri and S.B. Rao, volume 30 appearing in 2005 edited by S.P. Gupta, K.N. Dikshit, and K.S. Ramachandran.

== See also ==
- Archaeological Survey of India
- Indian History and Culture Society
