= Indian History and Culture Society =

The Indian History and Culture Society (IHCS) was founded in 1977, and operates from the premises of the Indian Archaeological Society in New Delhi. The society's journal History Today has been appearing annually since 2000. The society is now known as The History and Culture Society, and is chaired by Prof. D.P Tiwari, a professor in the Department of Ancient Indian History and Archaeology at the University of Lucknow. The Society aims to promote and organize interdisciplinary studies of Indian history and culture and to provide a common platform for distinguished scholars engaged in Indology, as well as organize various academic journals and conferences.

== Formation ==
The Society was founded by Dr. S.P. Gupta (a prominent archaeologist and Chairman of the Indian Archaeological Society) and Dr. D. Devahuti of the National Museum, New Delhi, and inaugurated by then Prime Minister Morarji Desai accompanied by eminent scholars such as Prof. Lallanji Gopal (of BHU), Prof. B. P. Sinha (head of History at Patna University), Prof. Khalid Ahmed Nizami (head of History at Aligarh Muslim University), Prof. G.C. Pande, Prof. K.D. Bajpai, and Prof. Tan Chung.

The publication History Today was first edited by Dr. S.K Jolly (a historian of Sikh Revivalism) and subsequently, in due course it was edited by Dr. Vandana Kaushik, Ms. S. Radhakrishnan and Prof. D.P. Tiwari.

When the Janata government of 1977-79 (including the former Jan Sangh) was elected, it blocked the Towards Freedom Project of the Indian Council of Historical Research (ICHR) claiming that the history textbooks promoted by the ICHR suffered an ahistorical Marxist ideological distortion. After the Indian History Congress endorsed the textbook writers affiliated with the ICHR, the Janata government funded the then new Indian History and Culture Society. According to scholars L.I. Rudolph and Sussane Rudolph, it attracted a variety of historians, some sympathetic to the Rashtriya Swayamsevak Sangh (RSS) and others disaffected from the textbook "establishment."

== Activities ==
The IHCS offered a forum for a dialogue among quarrelling Indian historians and organized a number of seminars to discuss fundamental problems of Indian historiography. According to its chairperson Prof. D. Devahuti, "one had to free oneself from Western categories like, for instance, that of class struggle, and resume 'indigenous frameworks of interpretation'." She characterized Indian history, including medieval Indian history, as one of consent: 'emphasis appears to have been on consensus, i.e. adjustment, give and take, synthesis or at least an active acceptance of coexistence'.

The group's first publication, the 1979 Problems of Indian Historiography, is essentially the proceedings of its seminar in 1978. The book sought to free itself from 'imperialist and Marxist' approaches while simultaneously avoiding Hindu or Muslim communal biases in order to foster writing a more 'objective history' from a postcolonial, nativist, and an Indian point of view rather than a foreign one. Historian Pratap Chandra criticised British historians of India and their Indian disciples for their idea that nation states were deemed to be 'intrinsically desirable', which he argued led to an overstatement of the historical unity of India. Historian D.P Singhal further vehemently criticised Marxists, finding them a growing and unhealthy influence on Indian universities and their history departments.

== Publications ==
1. Aspects of Indian History and Culture (1984) - C.E. Ramachandran and K.V. Raman (Ed.)
2. Essays in Indian History and Culture (1986) - Y. Krishan (Ed.)
3. Studies in Indian History and Culture (1988) - K.S. Ramachandran (Ed.)
4. Dimensions in Indian Archaeology and History (1989) - S.K. Pandey and K.S. Ramachandran (Ed.)
5. Facets of Indian History, Culture and Archaeology (1991) - S.P. Gupta and K.S. Ramachandran (Ed.)
6. Dimensions in Indian History and Archaeology (1993) - S.P. Gupta and K.S. Ramachandran (Ed.)
