= Swaraj Prakash Gupta =

Indian archaeologist and art historian

Dr. S.P Gupta
- Born: 1931
- Died: 2007 (aged 75–76)

Swaraj Prakash Gupta (S. P. Gupta, 1931–2007) was a prominent Indian archaeologist, art historian authority, Chairman of Indian Archaeological Society, founder of the Indian History and Culture Society, and Director of the Allahabad Museum. He was most noted for several excavations of Indus Valley Civilisation sites and for his support of the existence of a destroyed Ram Mandir underneath the Babri Masjid in Ayodhya.

== Career ==
Dr. Gupta edited several volumes of the Puratattva, the journal of the Indian Archaeological Society. He was a distinguished archaeologist and art historian who was awarded several gold medals and the Sir Mortimer Wheeler Prize for Excellence in Archaeology. He won the first Dr Vishnu Shridhar Wakankar National Award of Madhya Pradesh in recognition of his devotion and contribution to archaeological research.

The Indian Society for Prehistoric and Quaternary Studies had published a volume of papers in his honour in 2009.

== Ayodhya dispute ==
Dr. Gupta was a prominent scholar who supported the pro-Temple side of the Ayodhya dispute. He argued that there was evidence of an 11th-century temple that lay underneath the masjid, which might have been demolished by Babur (the founder of the Mughal Empire and a Turkic invader hailing from present-day Uzbekistan), since no written record about its demolition exist. This temple was a Hindu pilgrimage site and considered to be one of the holiest temples in Hinduism due to the belief by many Hindus to be the birthplace of Ram. The masjid was demolished in 1992 by Hindu protestors.

From the crumbling walls of the so-called Babri [Mosque] and the old and new debris there emerged, like the proverbial phoenix, hundreds of objects which testify ... to the existence of the eleventh- to twelfth-century Rama temple ...

- Dr. S.P. Gupta

Dr. Gupta was contested by scholars like Romila Thapar, S. Gopal and K.N. Panikkar on the photographs of stone pillars and the doorjamb which he used to illustrate the supposed temple, as some of them were found a kilometer away. They also point to the pillar bases and conclude from the style of pottery (Note: Glazed potsherds of the blue-and-white Islamic style. This style first comes into use in 15th-century Persia.) found with pillar bases, that they are not constructed before 15th century

Some controversy arose when the topic of Ayodhya was not discussed at the World Archaeological Congress held in Delhi in December 1994. While he himself was not responsible for the veto, he and eminent archaeologist B. B. Lal reportedly pressured the president of the international executive committee, J. Golson (as a member of the organising committee) to issue it. This resulted in criticism from some historians and archaeologists who said that he was 'stifling free discourse'. J. Golson justified the veto due to the 'politically and communally sensitive' nature of the issue, adding that the 'practical consequences of discussing this issue would be beyond the Executive's control'.

B.B. Lal later justified the decision as follows:

People have discussed this topic [Ayodhya] for two years now and have still not reached any conclusion. The Supreme Court also could not reach any conclusion. So, why waste time on it? If we have time after all the papers, we will see what we can do. - B. B. Lal, quoted in The Asian Age, December 7, 1994

== Personal life ==
From childhood Gupta was a member of the Rashtriya Swayamsevak Sangh. Dr Gupta remained a bachelor throughout his life.

He died on the evening of 3 October 2007, at a private nursing home. He was unwell for a fortnight, suffering from acute asthma and breathlessness. He was 76.

== Bibliography ==
Art History and Culture

- Tourism, Museums and Monuments (1975)
- The Roots of Indian Art (1980) (French edition: 1990)
- Cultural Tourism in India (S. P. Gupta and K. Lal), Indraprastha Museum of Art and Archaeology and D. K. Printworld, 2002, ISBN 8124602166.
- Elements of Indian Art: Including Temple Architecture, Iconography and Iconometry (S. P. Gupta and S. P. Asthana) New Delhi: Indraprastha Museum of Art and Archaeology, 2002, ISBN 81-246-0213-1.
- Temples in India (S. P. Gupta and V. Somasekh) New Delhi: Centre for Research and Training in History, Archaeology and Paleo-Environment, 2010, ISBN 8124604959.

Archaeology and History

- Disposal of the Dead and Physical Types in Ancient India (1971)
- Mahabharata, Myth and Reality - Differing Views (S. P. Gupta and K. S. Ramachandran, ed.) Delhi: Agam Prakashan, 1976.
- Archaeology of Soviet Central Asia and the Indian Borderlands (2 volumes) (1978)
- 'Frontiers of the Indus Civilization (B. B. Lal and S. P. Gupta, Eds.). New Delhi: Indian Archaeological Society, 1984.
- The lost Sarasvati and the Indus Civilization, Jodhpur: Kusumanjali Prakashan, 1984
- The Indus-Sarasvati Civilization, Delhi: Pratibha Prakashan (1996).
- Dimensions in Indian History and Archaeology (S. P. Gupta and K. S. Ramachandran, eds.) New Delhi: Indian History and lture Society, 1993.

Selected articles

- S. P. Gupta. The dawn of civilization, in G. C. Pande (ed.)History of Science, Philosophy and Culture in Indian Civilization ed., D. P. Chattophadhyaya, vol I Part 1) (New Delhi: Centre for Studies in Civilizations, 1999)
