= Rajendra Nagar metro station =

Patna Metro's Corridor 2 metro station

Rajendra Nagar

General information
- Location: Rajendra Nagar Terminal, Kankarbagh Old Bypass, Patna-800020, Bihar (India)
- Coordinates: 25.602558°N 85.162061°E
- System: Patna Metro station
- Operator: Patna Metro Rail Corporation Ltd
- Platforms: 2
- Tracks: Double track

Construction
- Structure type: Underground

Other information
- Status: under-construction

History
- Electrified: Single-phase 25 kV 50 Hz AC through overhead catenary

Services
Preceding station	Patna Metro	Following station
Moin-ul-Haq Stadium towards Patna Junction	Blue Line (partially operational)	Malahi Pakri towards New ISBT
Route map
Location

Rajendra Nagar is an upcoming underground Patna Metro station in Patna, Bihar, India. It is part of Corridor 2, also known as the North–South corridor, which runs between Patna Junction and Patliputra Bus Terminal.

== Location ==
The station is being constructed underground in the Rajendra Nagar area, beneath Kankarbagh Old Bypass Road, near the parking area of Rajendra Nagar Terminal railway station. The station will have two entrances and two exits. One will be within the railway premises, while the other will be towards the College of Commerce.

The station will be situated between Moin-ul-Haq Stadium and Malahi Pakri stations. Malahi Pakri is currently operational, while Rajendra Nagar is under construction. It will be the only Patna Metro station on Kankarbagh Old Bypass Road.

== History ==
The first detailed project report (DPR) prepared by RITES proposed an alignment along Kankarbagh Old Bypass Road, which included the area of the present station. The alignment was later changed by the Delhi Metro Rail Corporation (DMRC) towards Malahi Pakri.

Work on the underground section commenced in 2022. The station is part of the section between Akashvani and Rajendra Nagar, which includes Rajendra Nagar station, for which Larsen & Toubro was the lowest bidder.

In June 2026, a 681-metre long underground tunnel section between Moin-ul-Haq Stadium and Rajendra Nagar was completed using a tunnel boring machine. The tunnel passes beneath the railway infrastructure around Rajendra Nagar Terminal.
