= Malahi Pakri metro station =

Patna Metro's Blue Line metro station

Malahi Pakri मलाही पकरी

General information
- Location: Malahi Pakri roundabout, 90 Feet road, Kankarbagh, Patna-800026, Bihar (India)
- Coordinates: 25°35′37.78″N 85°9′28.2″E
- System: Patna Metro station
- Operator: Patna Metro Rail Corporation Ltd
- Tracks: 2

Construction
- Structure type: Elevated

Other information
- Status: Operational

History
- Opened: 2 July 2026; 54 days ago
- Electrified: Single-phase 25 kV 50 Hz AC through overhead catenary

Services
Preceding station	Patna Metro	Following station
Rajendra Nagar towards Patna Junction	Blue Line (partially operational)	Khemnichak towards New ISBT
Route map
Location

Malahi Pakri is an elevated metro station on the Blue Line of Patna Metro in Patna, Bihar, India. The metro services were extended upto Malahi Pakri station on 2 July, 2026, but Khemnichak metro station will have no stoppage due to incomplete work.

== Overview ==
Malahi Pakri metro station is part of the priority corridor of the Patna Metro, along with New ISBT, Zero Mile, Bhootnath, and Kheminichak Metro stations. Work on this station began in 2022. This metro station will serve the Kankarbagh neighbourhood.

== Station layout ==
G
Street level
Exit/Entrance
L1
Concourse
Station agent, ticket counters, information kiosks, public announcement systems, check-in/out facilities, food courts, retail shops, and accessibility features, etc

L2
Side platform | Doors will open on the left
Platform 2
Southbound
Towards → Patliputra Bus Terminal
Next Station: Khemnichak

Change at the next station for Red Line

Platform 1
Northbound
Towards ← Patna Junction
Next Station: Rajendra Nagar
Side platform | Doors will open on the left

== See also ==
- List of metro systems
