= Khemnichak metro station =

Patna Metro's Blue Line metro station

Khemnichak खेमनीचक

General information
- Location: Khemnichak, NH-30, New Bypass Road, Patna-800027 Bihar (India)
- Coordinates: 25°35′4.43″N 85°9′32.01″E
- System: Patna Metro station
- Operator: Patna Metro Rail Corporation Ltd
- Tracks: 4 (TBC)

Construction
- Structure type: Elevated
- Parking: (TBC)
- Accessible: (TBC)

Other information
- Status: Operational
- Station code: (TBC)

History
- Opened: 2 July 2026; 54 days ago

Services
Preceding station	Patna Metro	Following station
Malahi Pakri towards Patna Junction	Blue Line (partially operational)	Bhootnath towards New ISBT
Ramakrishna Nagar towards Danapur Cantonment	Red Line (under construction)	Terminus
Route map
Location

Khemnichak is an elevated interchange metro station on the Blue Line and the Red Line of Patna Metro in Patna, Bihar, India. The Red Line terminates at this metro station.

Khemnichak is part of the priority corridor of the Patna Metro, which includes stations from Malahi Pakri to New ISBT. This corridor is scheduled to open on 15 August 2025; however, Khemni Chak station will not be operational at that time, as it is still under construction. The delay was primarily caused by land acquisition issues.

== Overview ==
Khemnichak metro station is part of the priority corridor of the Patna Metro, along with New ISBT, Zero Mile, Bhootnath, and Kheminichak Metro stations. This metro station will serve the Khemnichak and the new bypass area.

== See also ==
- List of metro systems
