= Gandhi Maidan metro station =

Patna Metro's Blue Line metro station

Gandhi Maidan

General information
- Location: North Gandhi Maidan Marg, Patna-800001, Bihar (India)
- Coordinates: 25°37′11.604″N 85°8′42.542″E
- System: Patna Metro station
- Owner: Patna Metro Rail Corporation Ltd
- Operator: Delhi Metro Rail Corporation
- Platforms: 2
- Tracks: Double track

Construction
- Structure type: Underground

Other information
- Status: under-construction

History
- Electrified: Single-phase 25 kV 50 Hz AC through overhead catenary

Services
Preceding station	Patna Metro	Following station
Akashvani towards Patna Junction	Blue Line (partially operational)	PMCH towards New ISBT
Route map
Location

Gandhi Maidan is an upcoming underground metro station on the Blue Line of the Patna Metro system, located in the heart of Patna, Bihar, India. Strategically positioned near the historic Gandhi Maidan and Kargil Chowk, the station is designed to serve as a key transit hub for central Patna, connecting major administrative, commercial, and cultural landmarks.

== Design and Layout ==
The station spans approximately 202 meters in length and features a two-level underground design:

- Concourse Level: Includes ticket counters, automated fare collection gates, and passenger amenities.
- Platform Level: Serves trains running along the Blue Line corridor.

== Entry/Exit Points ==
There are three entry/exit gates, each strategically placed to maximise accessibility:

- Gate 1: In front of Red Cross Society, near Magadh Mahila College
- Gate 2: Near Patna Collectorate and Bankipur Bus Stand
- Gate 3: Facing Gandhi Maidan, adjacent to Kali Mandir

Lifts are provided at Gates 2 and 3 to support accessibility for senior citizens and disabled passengers.

== Passenger Amenities ==
- Escalators: 7 total (1 at each entry/exit, 4 between concourse and platform)
- Staircases: 5 total (1 at each entry/exit, 2 between levels)
- Fire Escapes: 2 public staircases and 1 dedicated firemen access route
- Safety Features: Emergency evacuation routes, fire detection systems, and CCTV surveillance

== Connectivity and Importance ==
Gandhi Maidan metro station is expected to become a transportation lifeline for Patna’s central business district. It will serve:

- Government offices: Patna Collectorate
- Educational institutions: Magadh Mahila College, Patna University
- Cultural venues: Samrat Ashok International Convention Centre, Shri Krishna Memorial Hall
- Public spaces: Gandhi Maidan Ground, Red Cross Society

The station is part of Patna Metro’s multi-modal integration plan, linking metro services with bus routes and pedestrian pathways to ensure seamless urban mobility.

== See also ==
- List of metro systems
