= Bhootnath Road =

- Neighbourhood
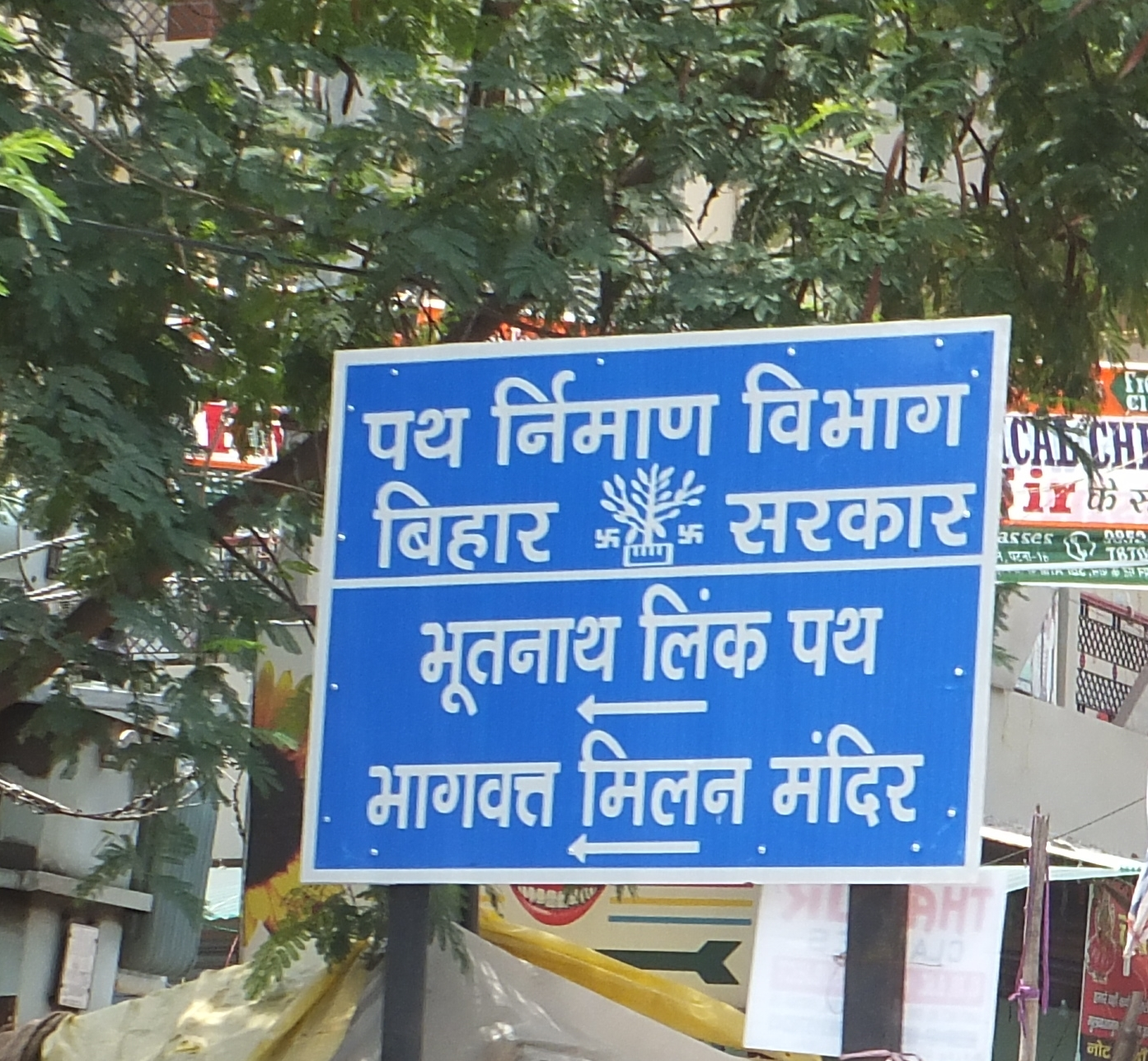
- Signboard identifying Bhootnath link path

- Location in Patna, India
- Coordinates: 25°35′57″N 85°10′31″E
- Country: India
- State: Bihar
- Metro: Patna

Languages
  - Spoken: Hindi, Magadhi, English
- Time zone: UTC+5:30 (IST)
- PIN: 800026
- Planning agency: PMRA
- Civic agency: PMC

Bhootnath Road is a prominent thoroughfare in eastern Patna, Bihar, India. It connects the Old Bypass Road (Kankarbagh main road) to the New Bypass Road (NH-30), serving as a vital link between older residential zones and newer urban developments. The road passes through the Bahadurpur Housing Colony, a well-established residential neighbourhood, and is also located near the Patna Doordarshan TV Tower, a notable local landmark. The area is served by Agamkuan Police Station under Patna Police and B H Colony Post Office.

== Transport and Connectivity ==
The area surrounding Bhootnath Road is densely populated and features a mixture of residential complexes, educational institutions, and commercial establishments. It is well-integrated into Patna’s public transport network, with frequent access to city buses, auto-rickshaws, and shared transport services.

The Bhootnath Station, part of the Blue Line of the Patna Metro, is the nearest metro access point, enhancing connectivity for daily commuters and residents. Rajendra Nagar Terminal, one of Patna’s major railway stations, is located approximately 3 kilometers from the northern end of Bhoothnath Road. Gulzarbagh Railway Station, a smaller local station, is also situated nearby but does not serve as a major transit hub. The Jay Prakash Narayan International Airport is located about 10 kilometers from the same northern end, offering air connectivity to domestic and international destinations.

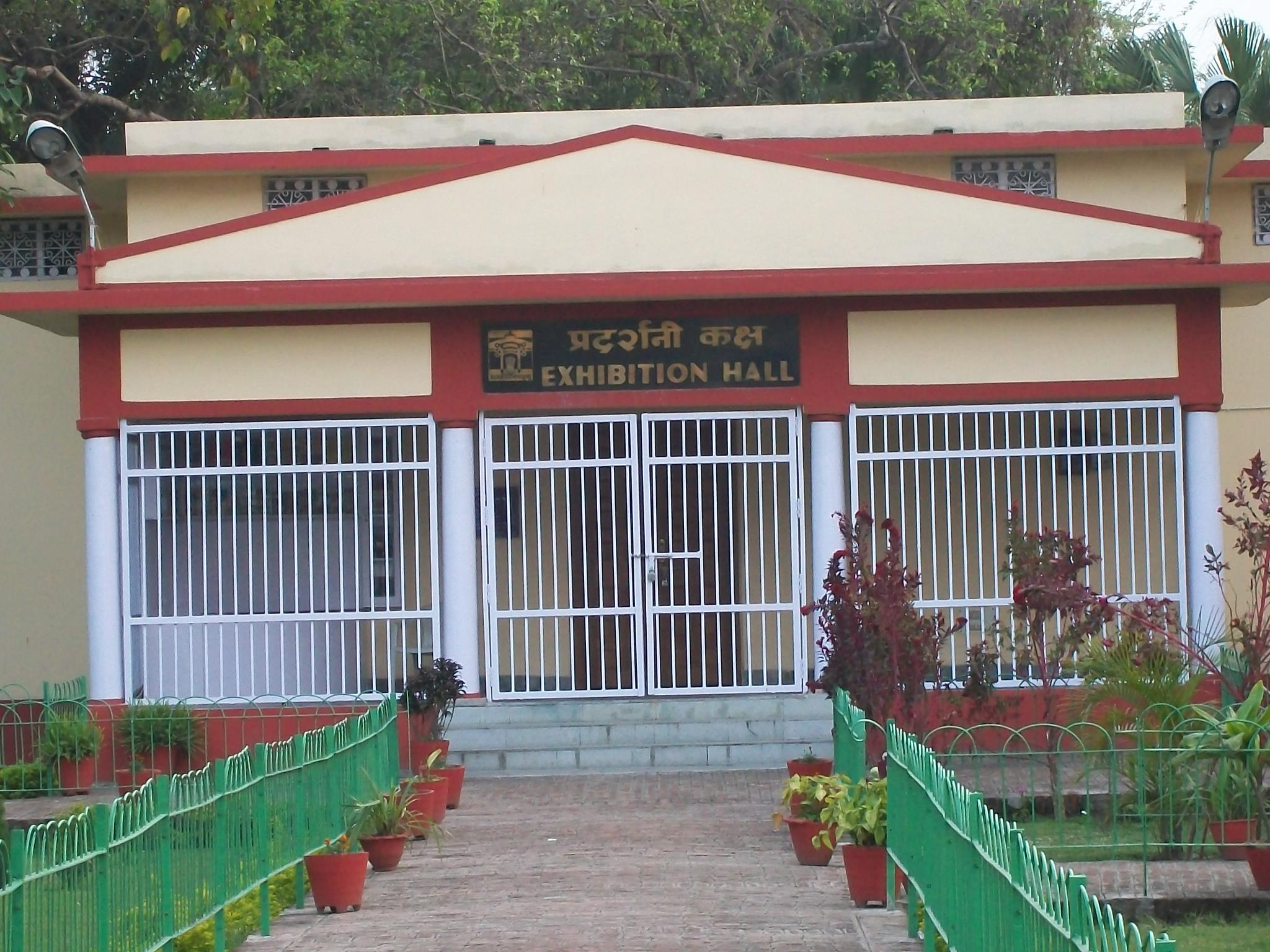
Kumhrar park's museum, where the old artifacts taken out of the excavation of old historical Maurya Pataliputra of ancient time are preserved.

== Major landmarks ==
- NMCH
- Super 30
- Litera Valley School

== Localities ==
Famous areas in Bhootnath road include:

- Kumhrar
- Mundrikayan

== Education institutions ==
In the past decade, the Bazar Samiti area has emerged as a popular coaching destination for competitive exams preparation, which is near to bhootnath road. The area attracts thousands of students every year from its state and other neighbouring states to prepare primarily for the IIT-JEE. Super 30, Asia's one of the top institute is located near bhootnath road.

- Litera Valley School, Patna
- Dr. G.L. Dutta D.A.V. Public School, Transport Nagar
- St. Joseph's High School, Patna
- Nalanda Medical College and Hospital
- Alokit Public School
- Shivam Convent
- Sindu Public School

== See also ==
- Kumhrar
- Kankarbagh
