= Zero Mile metro station =

Patna Metro's Blue Line metro station

Zero Mile ज़ीरो माइल

General information
- Location: Pahadi Road, New Bypass, Transport Nagar, Patna-800026, Bihar (India)
- Coordinates: 25°35′8.87″N 85°11′11.12″E
- System: Patna Metro station
- Operator: Patna Metro Rail Corporation Ltd
- Tracks: Double track

Construction
- Structure type: Elevated

Other information
- Status: operational

History
- Opened: 06 October 2025; 10 months ago
- Electrified: Single-phase 25 kV 50 Hz AC through overhead catenary

Services
Preceding station	Patna Metro	Following station
Bhootnath towards Patna Junction	Blue Line (partially operational)	New ISBT Terminus
Route map
Location

Zero Mile is an elevated metro station on the Blue Line of Patna Metro in Patna, Bihar, India. It serves as one of the three stations in the Priority Corridor, which became operational on 6 October 2025.

== Overview ==
The station was inaugurated by Chief Minister Nitish Kumar on 6 October 2025, as part of the launch of the first operational stretch of the Patna Metro. Public services commenced the following day, 7 October 2025. The Zero Mile lies on a 3.6 kilometre elevated corridor that connects Bhootnath and Patliputra Bus Terminal metro stations. This corridor is the first phase of the Blue Line, which will eventually span 14.5 Kms, linking Patna Junction to Patliputra Bus Terminal through a combination of elevated and underground sections.

This metro station serves the Transport Nagar and adjoining areas.

== Infrastructure and facilities ==
The station features:

- Three-coach trains with a capacity of 158 seated and up to 940 standing passengers
- Bi-parting sliding doors and front emergency exits
- CCTV surveillance and bilingual announcements in Hindi and English
- Charging points for mobile devices and laptops
- Reserved seating for women and disabled passengers

Trains operate between 8:00 AM and 10:00 PM, with a frequency of every 20 minutes, totaling approximately 40–42 trips per day. Fares starts from ₹15, depending on the travel distance.

== Station layout ==
G	Street level	Exit/Entrance
L1	Concourse	Station agent, ticket counters, information kiosks, public announcement systems, check-in/out facilities, food courts, retail shops, and accessibility features, etc
L2	Side platform | Doors will open on the left
L2	Platform 2 Eastbound	Towards → Patliputra Bus Terminal; Next Station: Patliputra Bus Terminal
L2	Platform 1 Westbound	Towards ← Patna Junction; Next Station: Bhootnath
L2	Side platform | Doors will open on the left

== See also ==
- List of metro systems
