= Blue Line (Patna Metro) =

Blue Line

Overview
- Status: Partially operational
- Locale: Patna
- Termini: Patna Junction; Patliputra Bus Terminal (New ISBT)
- Stations: 12

Service
- Type: Rapid transit
- System: Patna Metro
- Operator(s): Patna Metro Rail Corporation Limited; Delhi Metro Rail Corporation Limited
- Rolling stock: Titagarh Firema

History
- Planned opening: 'Phase 2 – December 2027; 14 months' time (TBC)
- Opened: Phase 1 – 6 October 2025; 10 months ago

Technical
- Line length: Total: 14.564 km (9.050 mi), Priority Corridor: 6.107 km (3.795 mi)
- Number of tracks: 2
- Character: Underground, and Elevated
- Track gauge: 1,435 mm (4 ft 8 1/2 in) standard gauge
- Electrification: 25 kV 50 Hz AC overhead catenary

The Blue Line of Patna Metro (also known as North – South Corridor or Corridor 2) is a rapid transit line currently under construction in Patna, Bihar, India. The 14.56 km (9.05 mi) line connects Patna Junction railway station (central Patna) with Patliputra Inter-State Bus Terminal (New ISBT) on State Highway 1. The Blue Line is mostly underground, covering (7.926 km (4.925 mi)), but it also includes a 6.638 km (4.125 mi) elevated section. There are 12 stations on the line.

Blue Line will have two interchanges with the Red Line at Patna Junction and Malahi Pakdi stations. The red line is under construction.

The entire line is planned to open in two phases. The first phase, known as the priority corridor, spans a total distance of 6.1 km stretch (Malahi Pakri – Patliputra Bus Terminal) (New ISBT), and was scheduled for initial commissioning, whereas the second phase, covering the remaining stretch of 8.45 km (Patna Junction – Rajendra Nagar) is expected to be operational around December 2028. A 3.6 km stretch of this corridor was opened to the public on 7 October 2025.

Operations and maintenance are currently being handled by the Delhi Metro Rail Corporation (DMRC) under a minimum three-year arrangement.

== History ==
The original DPR prepared by RITES had proposed a route from PMCH to New ISBT, passing through Premchand Rangashala, Rajendra Nagar Terminal, Nalanda Medical College and Hospital (NMCH), Kumhrar, Gandhi Setu to Zero Mile. However, Chief Minister Nitish Kumar later decided against this alignment, as it ran through the historically significant city of Patliputra, encompassing heritage areas like Kumhrar and Patna City. The route was deemed unsuitable due to its potential impact on these sites. Subsequently, when the Delhi Metro Rail Corporation (DMRC) prepared their DPR, the alignment was revised to pass through Moin-ul-Haq Stadium, Malahi Pakdi, Khemnichak, and Bhootnath Road.

The foundation stone of the metro project was laid by the Prime Minister of India, Narendra Modi, on 17 February 2019.

Progress on this line unfolded in key stages:

- Soil testing began on 1 November 2019 at Malahi Pakri.
- Groundwork commenced on 26 November 2020.
- The first pier cap was cast on 28 April 2022.
- On the occasion of India's Republic Day, the first Precast viaduct U-girder span was placed between two pillars, P-103 and P-104, near the proposed Bhoothnath Station.
- The first Tunnel Boring Machine (TBM) completed tunneling at Moin-ul-Haque Stadium on 22 July 2023, marking a significant milestone for the underground segment of the corridor.
- The first trial run was successfully conducted on 2 September 2025 between Patliputra Bus Terminal and Bhootnath Metro Stations. The final and crucial trial was held on 29 September 2025, ahead of public inauguration.
- Three stations of this line were inaugurated on 6 October 2025 by Chief Minister Nitish Kumar and opened to the public on 7 October 2025. This event marked the official beginning of the Patna Metro.
- On 2 July 2026, the Blue Line was extended to Malahi Pakri.

== Stations ==
The line will have a total of 12 stations. The northern end of the line, which is underground, features seven underground stations, while the southern end, which is elevated, has five elevated stations.

=== Interchanges ===
Passenger interchange facilities for connections to other metro and railway lines will be available at the following stations:

- Khemnichak: This station will offer interchange access to the Red Line, which will operate between Khemnichak and Danapur Cantonment.
- Patna Junction: This station will also connect to the Red Line, offering transfer along the route from Khemnichak and Danapur Cantonment. Additionally, it will provide direct connectivity to Patna Junction railway station operated by Indian Railways, ensuring easy access to long-distance and regional train services.

Blue Line
#	Station name		Opening	Interchange connection	Station layout	Platform level type*
#	English	Hindi	Opening	Interchange connection	Station layout	Platform level type*
1	Patna Junction	पटना जंक्शन	Under construction	Patna Junction; Red Line (Under construction)	Underground	Island
2	Akashvani	आकाशवाणी	Under construction	None	Underground	Island
3	Gandhi Maidan	गांधी मैदान	Under construction	None	Underground	Island
4	PMCH	पीएमसीएच	Under construction	None	Underground	Island
5	Patna Science College	पटना साइंस कॉलेज	Under construction	None	Underground	Island
6	Moin-ul-Haq Stadium	मोइन-उल-हक स्टेडियम	Under construction	None	Underground	Island
7	Rajendra Nagar	राजेंद्र नगर	Under construction	Rajendra Nagar Terminal	Underground	Island
8	Malahi Pakri	मलाही पकरी	2 July 2026	None	Elevated	Side
9	Khemnichak	खेमनीचक	2 July 2026	Red Line (Under construction)	Elevated	Side
10	Bhootnath	भूतनाथ	7 October 2025	None	Elevated	Side
11	Zero Mile	ज़ीरो माइल	7 October 2025	None	Elevated	Side
12	Patliputra Bus Terminal	पाटलिपुत्र बस टर्मिनल	7 October 2025	Patliputra ISBT	Elevated	Side

- *To be confirmed

== Train info ==
Blue Line
Rakes	Titagarh Firema^{#}
Train length	3
Train gauge	1,435 mm (4 ft 8 1/2 in) broad gauge
Electrification	25 kV, 50 Hz AC through overhead catenary OHE
Train's maximum operating speed	80 km/h^{##}
Train operation	Patna Metro

- ^{#} The rolling stock currently in operation is leased rather than owned.
- ^{##} The system is designed for a speed of 90 km/h. However, the maximum operating speed is limited to 80 km/h in general section, 80 km/h within underground stations, and 70 km/h at elevated and at-grade stations.

== See also ==
- Urban rail transit in India
- List of metro systems
- Delhi Metro
