= Moin-ul-Haq Stadium =

Cricket stadium

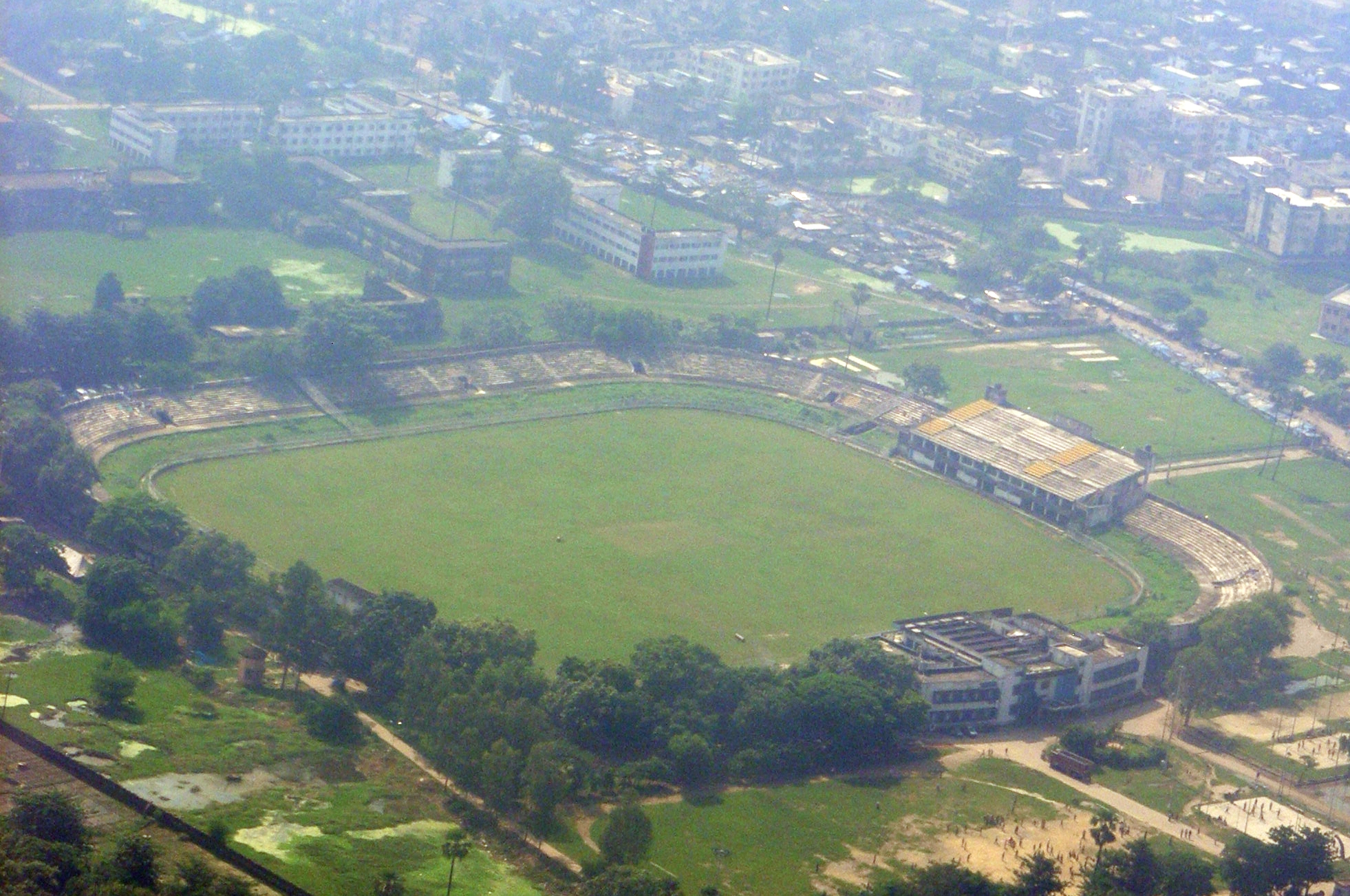
- Moin-ul-Haq Stadium Proposed Redevelopment of Moin-ul-Haq Stadium
- Interactive map of Moin-ul-Haq Stadium

Ground information
- Location: Rajendra Nagar, Patna, Bihar, India
- Country: India
- Coordinates: 25°36′28″N 85°10′4″E
- Establishment: 1969
- Capacity: 25,000
- Owner: Bihar Cricket Association
- Operator: Bihar Cricket Association
- Tenants: Indian Cricket Team; Bihar cricket team
- End names
- Ganga End; Pavilion End

International information
- First men's ODI: 15 November, 1993: Sri Lanka v Zimbabwe
- Last men's ODI: 27 February, 1996: Zimbabwe v Kenya
- Only women's Test: 17–19 November 1976: India v West Indies
- First women's ODI: 5 January 1978: India v New Zealand
- Last women's ODI: 22 December 1997: India v South Africa
- As of 7 January 2024; Source: Moin-Ul-Haque Stadium, ESPNcricinfo

Moin-ul-Haq Stadium previously known as Dr. Rajendra Prasad stadium is located in Rajendra Nagar, Patna, Bihar, India. The multi-purpose stadium has hosted three One Day International (ODI) matches including one from the 1996 Cricket World Cup. The stadium has a capacity of 25,000 people. It is used for cricket and association football. It is the home ground of Bihar Ranji Team. The government has proposed the stadium development expanding its seating capacity to 42,500. It is maintained by Bihar Cricket Association. Bihar Ranji Team had currently played many Ranji matches on this ground. It is named after Syed Muhammad Moin-ul-Haq, an Indian Sports administrator and former principal of Patna College.

== History ==
The stadium was previously known as Dr. Rajendra Prasad Stadium. It was renamed in 1970 after the death of icon Moin-ul-Haq, who was general secretary of Indian Olympic Association (IOA), India's chef-de-mission of the Indian Olympic contingent in 1948 to London and in 1952 to Helsinki, and one of the founding vice-presidents along with K A D Naoroji of the Bihar Cricket Association, in the year 1936 at Jamshedpur, of Bihar.

== Ground information ==
It was a state-of-the-art stadium in India with modern seating, equipment and facilities for players and spectators alike. But as the stadium is being neglected by the Board of Control for Cricket in India when it comes to hosting of international match because of problem between the Bihar Cricket Association and the Board of Control for Cricket in India, it has become totally outdated (more after the Indian Premier league emerged and other stadiums became Up-To-Date). After Jharkhand was carved out of Bihar, Bihar lost its Ranji Trophy team status. So, no Ranji Trophy matches are even held here. The stadium features a swimming pool and a cricket academy. It has a "Turf" pitch that follows the international standard. It is very near to Rajendra Nagar Terminal.

== List of Five Wicket Hauls ==
=== Key ===
Symbol	Meaning
†	The bowler was man of the match
‡	10 or more wickets taken in the match
§	One of two five-wicket hauls by the bowler in the match
Date	Day the Test started or ODI was held
Inn	Innings in which five-wicket haul was taken
Overs	Number of overs bowled.
Runs	Number of runs conceded
Wkts	Number of wickets taken
Econ	Runs conceded per over
Batsmen	Batsmen whose wickets were taken
Drawn	The match was drawn.

=== One Day Internationals ===
No.	Bowler	Date	Team	Opposing team	Inn	Overs	Runs	Wkts	Econ	Batsmen	Result
1	Paul Strang	27 February 1996	Zimbabwe	Kenya	1	9.4	21	5	2.17	Edward Odumbe; Thomas Odoyo; Aasif Karim; Martin Suji; Maurice Odumbe	Won

== Stadium facilities and accessibility ==
In 2013, it was announced by the Chief Minister of Bihar Nitish Kumar that an international cricket stadium will be constructed at Rajgir, Nalanda district and Moin-ul-Haq Stadium and Patliputra Sports Complex's indoor stadium will go for renovations.

Underground metro station of Patna Metro is being constructed near the stadium.

== Revival ==
The Moin-ul-Haq Stadium in Patna is undergoing a significant transformation to become a world-class sports facility. This initiative is led by the Bihar Cricket Association (BCA) in collaboration with the Bihar government and the Board of Control for Cricket in India (BCCI).

=== Renovation Timeline & Project Scope ===
- Commencement: Renovation work began in April 2025 following the completion of the detailed project report and the selection of a construction agency.
- Completion Target: The project aims to be completed by 2027.
- Budget: The BCCI has approved a budget of approximately ₹400 crore for the stadium's redevelopment.

=== Planned Features & Facilities ===
The revamped stadium will include:

- Seating Capacity: Expansion to accommodate 40,000–50,000 spectators.
- Corporate & VIP Amenities: 76 corporate boxes and accommodation for 250 VIPs.
- Sports Complex: Facilities for badminton, volleyball, swimming, and more.
- Hospitality Services: A hotel, restaurants, and a players' hostel.
- Cricket Academy: A dedicated cricket academy.
- Infrastructure: Features like floodlights, advanced drainage systems, and indoor practice arenas.

=== Government & BCCI Collaboration ===
- Ownership Transfer: In December 2024, the Bihar government transferred the stadium to the BCA on a 30-year lease, waiving a ₹37 crore land registry fee.
- BCCI Approval: The BCCI has endorsed the renovation, emphasizing the development of cricket infrastructure in Bihar.

== See also ==
- Rajgir International Cricket Stadium
- Patliputra Sports Complex
