= Kankarbagh =

Neighbourhood in Patna, Bihar, India

- Neighbourhood
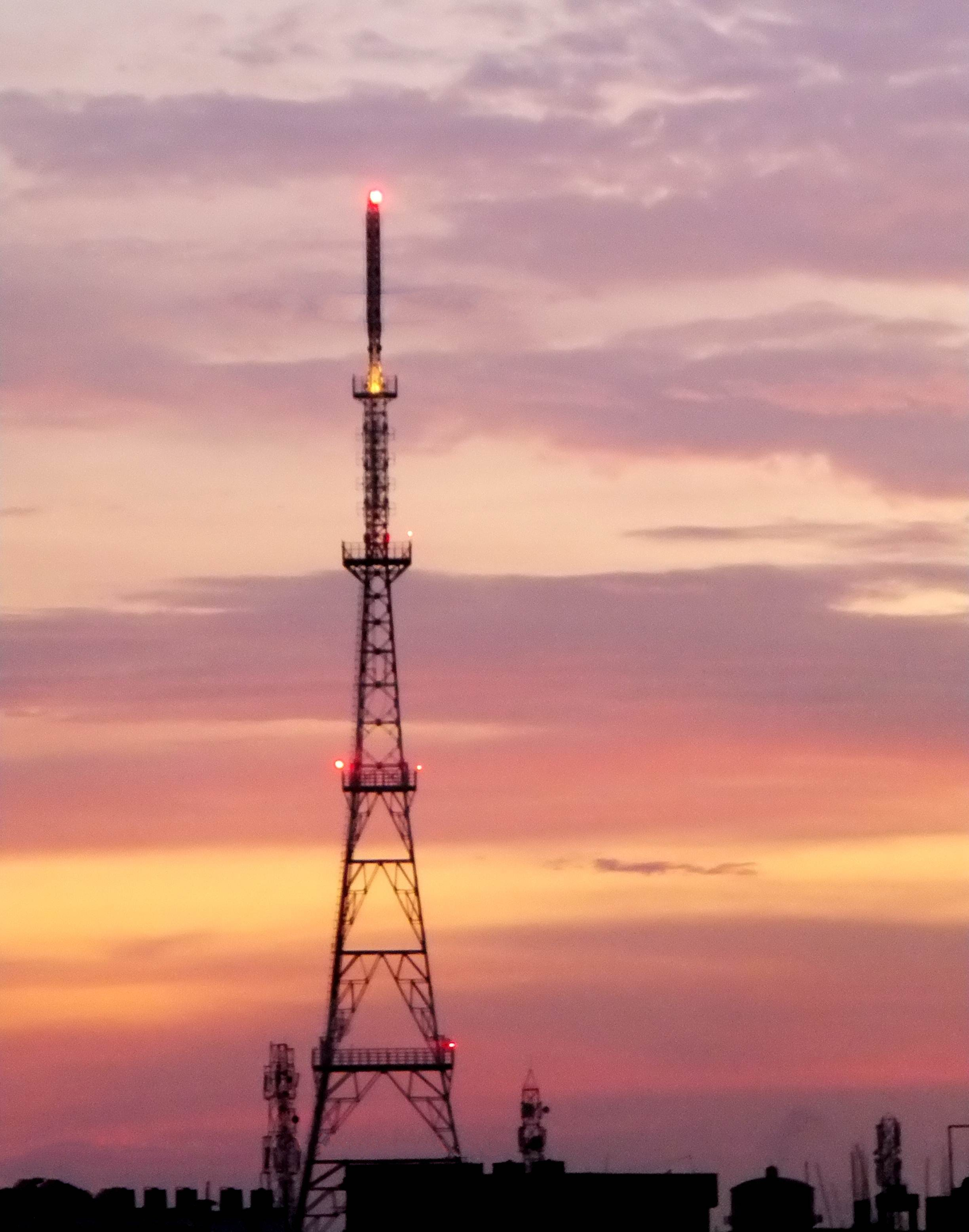
- TV tower in Bhootnath Road, as seen from Priyadarshi Nagar
- Nickname: King of colonies
- Location in Patna, India
- Coordinates: 25°35′36″N 85°10′0″E
- Country: India
- State: Bihar
- City: Patna
- Established: 1960s

Languages
  - Spoken: Hindi, English, Magahi
- Time zone: UTC+5:30 (IST)
- PIN: 800020; 800016; 800026
- Parliament constituencies: Patna Sahib
- Vidhan Sabha constituencies: Kumhrar
- Planning agency: Patna Metropolitan Area Authority
- Civic agency: Patna Municipal Corporation

Kankarbagh, or Kankarbagh Colony, is a neighborhood and residential area in Patna, Bihar, India. It is one of the largest colonies in Asia and the second largest in terms of population.

== Overview ==
Established in 1916, Kankarbagh covers an area of around 900 acres. It stretches roughly from Ashok Nagar in the South west to Kumhrar in the North East. The word Kankarbagh means 'garden of kankar' (stone chips).

== Kumhrar Park ==
Kumhrar, or Kumrahar, is the remains of an ancient city of Pataliputra, which is located 5 km east of Patna Junction railway station on Kankarbagh Main Road.

Archaeological remains from the Mauryan period (322–185 BCE) have been discovered here, including the ruins of a hypostyle 80-pillared hall. The excavation finds date back to 600 BCE and marks the ancient capital of Ajatashatru, Chandragupta and Ashoka; collectively, the relics range from four continuous periods from 600 BCE to 600 CE.

== Patliputra Sports Complex ==
The Patliputra Sports Complex (formally known as Kankarbagh Sports Complex) is a sports stadium in Kankarbagh. The Patliputra Sporting Complex was also known as Rainbow Field before the construction of the sports complex.

The complex is fully equipped with facilities for both outdoor and indoor games. Football, hockey, kabaddi, table tennis, carrom, swimming, wrestling, and taekwondo are some of the games organised here.

Since the inception of the Pro Kabaddi League in 2014, the stadium has played host to the Home matches of Patna Pirates (winners of the 2016 Pro Kabaddi League season (January) and 2016 Pro Kabaddi League season (June)).

The 31st National Taekwondo Championship, the 75th Senior National Table Tennis Championship and multiple junior Basketball and Tennis competitions have been hosted by the stadium.

== Police stations ==
The following police stations of the Patna Police serve this area:

- Kankarbagh Police Station
- Patrakar Nagar Police Station
- Agamkuan Police Station
- Ramkrishna Nagar Police Station

== Transport and connectivity ==
Kankarbagh is well connected to the main areas of Patna by mini buses. Auto-rickshaws and cycle rickshaws are available most of the time.

Rajendra Nagar Terminal, one of the city's important railway stations, and Patna's busiest railway station, Patna Junction, are less than a kilometer away from Kankarbagh. Patna Airport is located about 8.65 km from the Kankarbagh More. The Patliputra bus stand in Patna is located about 6.5 km from Kankarbagh.

== Notable people ==
- Arun Kumar Sinha
- Bilat Paswan Vihangam
- Ishan Kishan
- Jagdish Sharma
- Nitin Nabin
- Sushil Kumar Modi

== Gallery ==
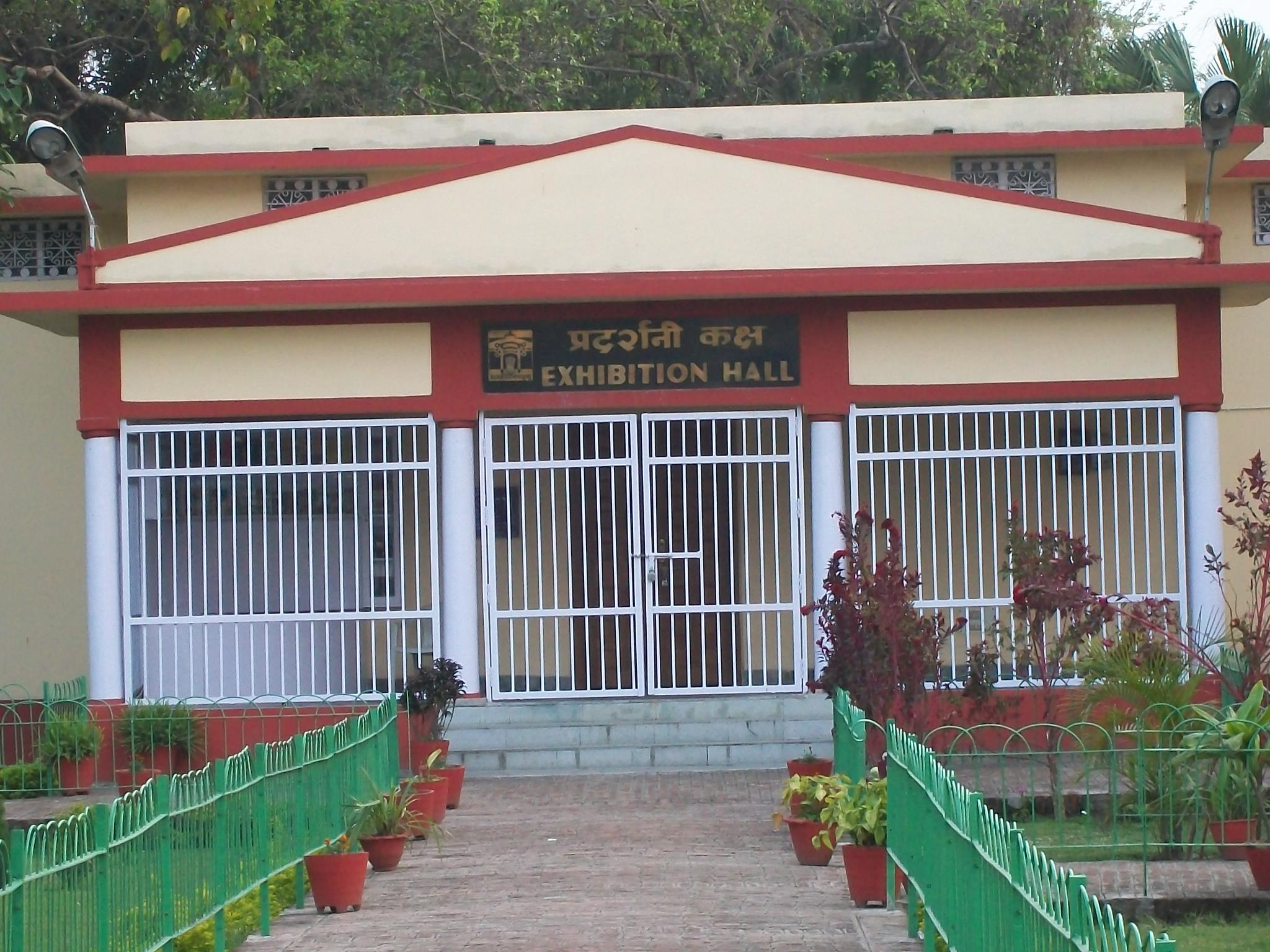
Kumhrar park’s museum, where the artefacts from the excavation of ancient Maurya Pataliputra are preserved

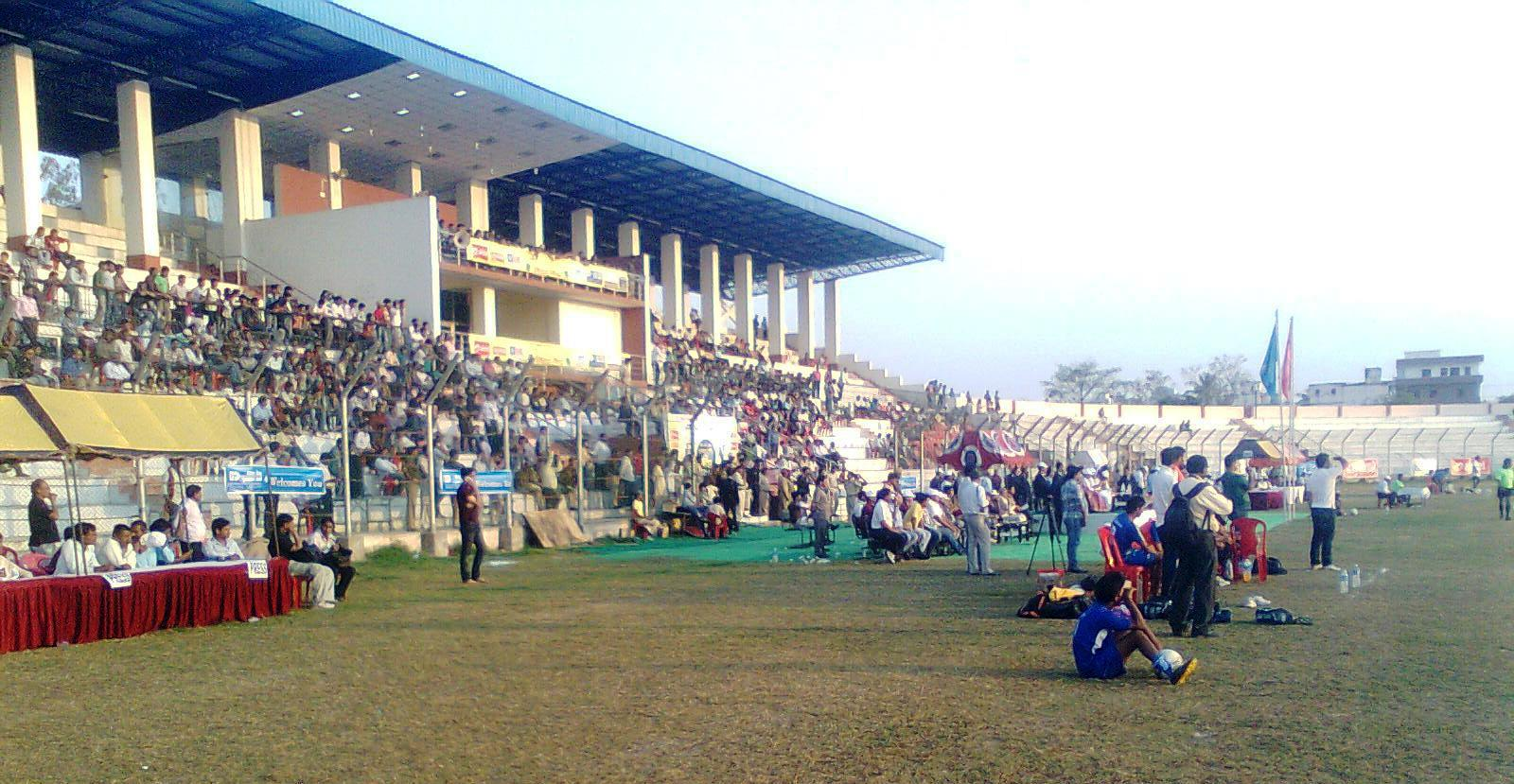
Patliputra Sports Complex: Bihar Cup

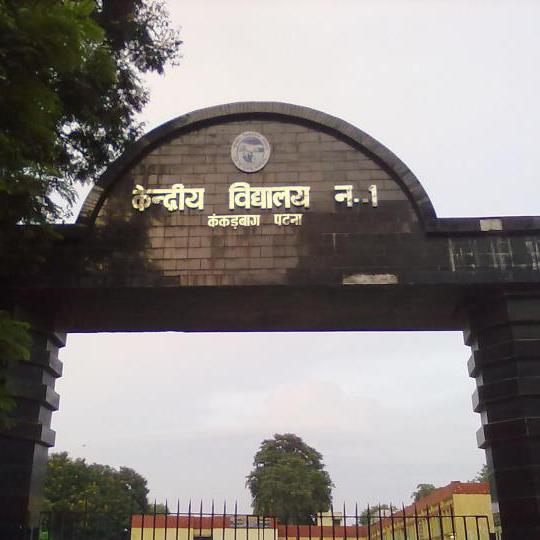
the front of the Kendriya Vidyalaya, Kankarbagh, Patna

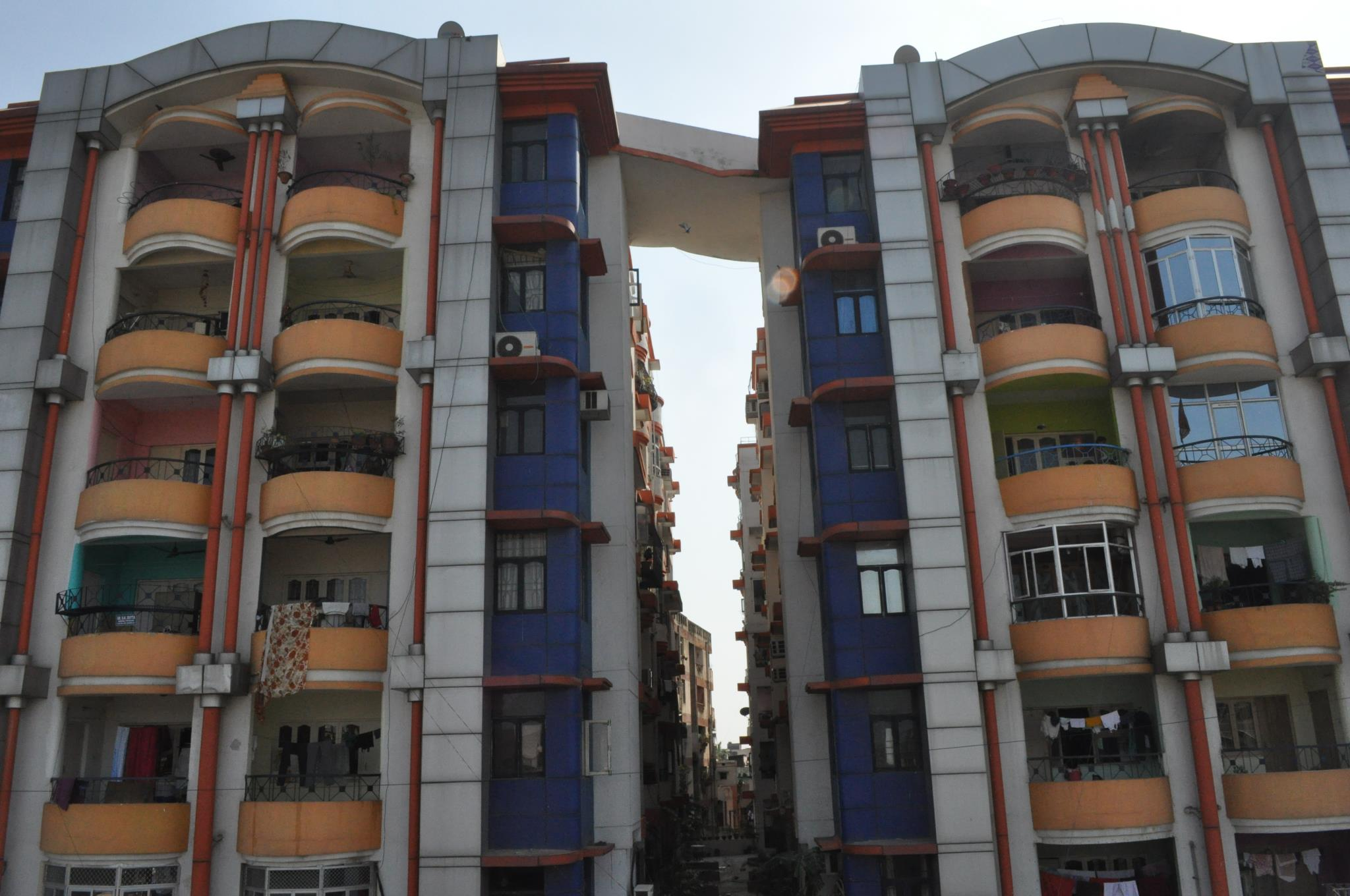
Kankarbagh is developing into an uptown area with expanding and soaring residential apartments.

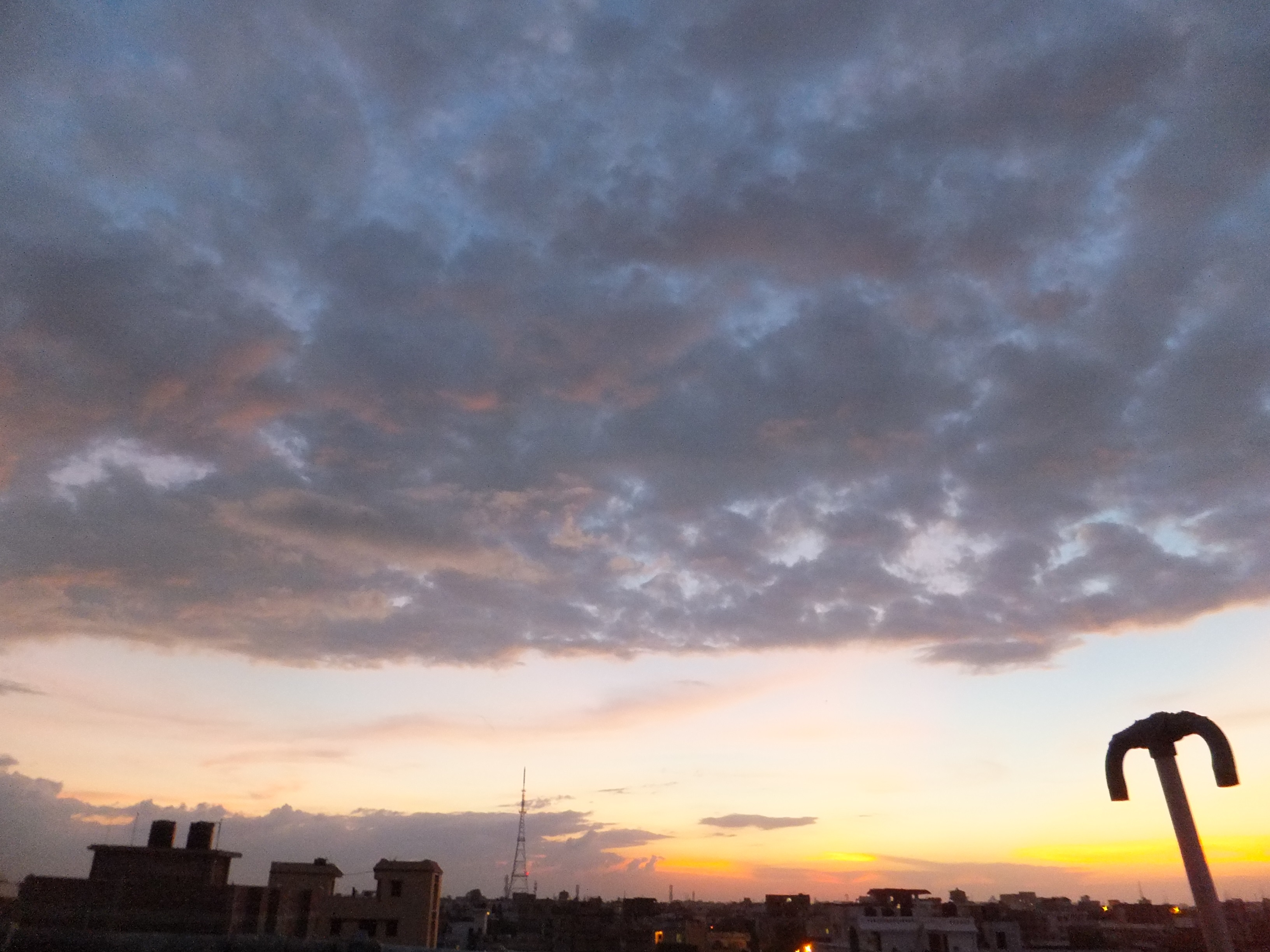
Monsoon clouds over Priyadarshi Nagar (near Bhootnath Road), a part of Kankarbagh- residential area in Patna, Bihar, India.
