= Kumhrar =

- Neighbourhood
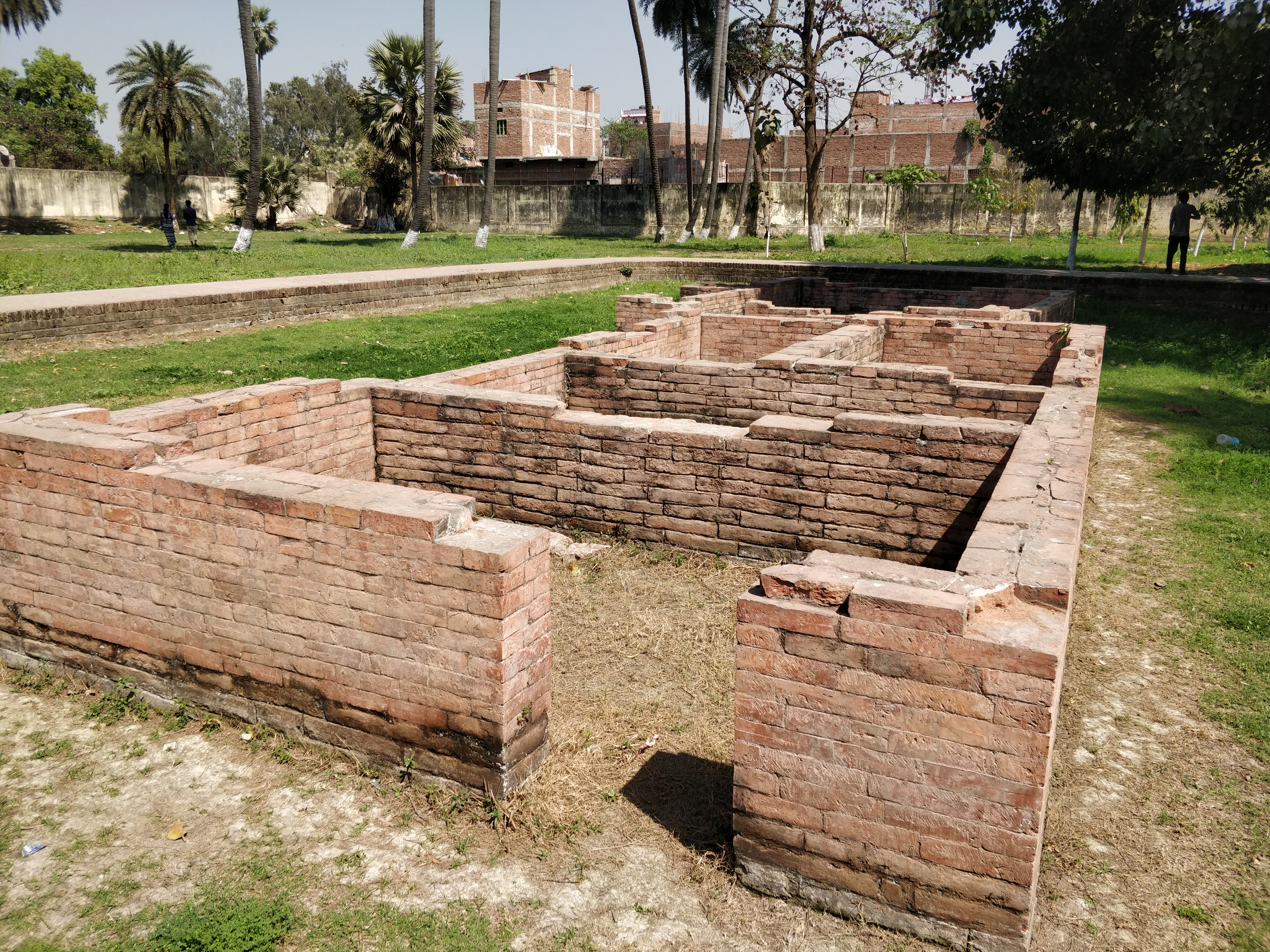
- Ruins of Arogya Vihar, ancient city of Pataliputra, Kumhrar

- Location in Patna, India
- Coordinates: 25°35′56″N 85°11′5″E
- Country: India
- State: Bihar
- Metro: Patna

Languages
  - Spoken: Hindi, Magadhi
- Time zone: UTC+5:30 (IST)
- PIN: 800026
- Planning agency: Patna Regional Development Authority
- Civic agency: Patna Municipal Corporation
- Website: patna.nic.in

Kumhrar or Kumrahar is the area of Patna where remains of the ancient city of Pataliputra were excavated by the Archaeological Survey of India starting from 1913. It is located 5 km east of Patna Railway Station.

Archaeological remains of the Mauryan period (322–185 BCE) have been discovered here in the land of Koiri Caste People, this include the ruins of a hypostyle 80-pillared hall The excavation findings here date back to 600 BCE, and marks the ancient capital of Ajātasattu, Chandragupta and Ashoka, and collectively the relics range from four continuous periods from 600 BCE to 600 CE.

== Assembly Hall of 80-pillars ==
=== Excavations ===
Following the excavation of nearby Bulandi Bagh by L.A. Waddell in 1895, American archaeologist David Brainard Spooner excavated in 1912–1913 in Kumhrar one pillar of polished stone, and a very large number of fragments. The excavators were able to trace 72 'pits' of ash and rubble on the site which marked the position in which other pillars must once have stood. During the subsequent excavation, done by K P Jaiswal, 1951–1955, eight more such pits were found, giving the hall its present name – "Assembly hall of 80 pillars"...

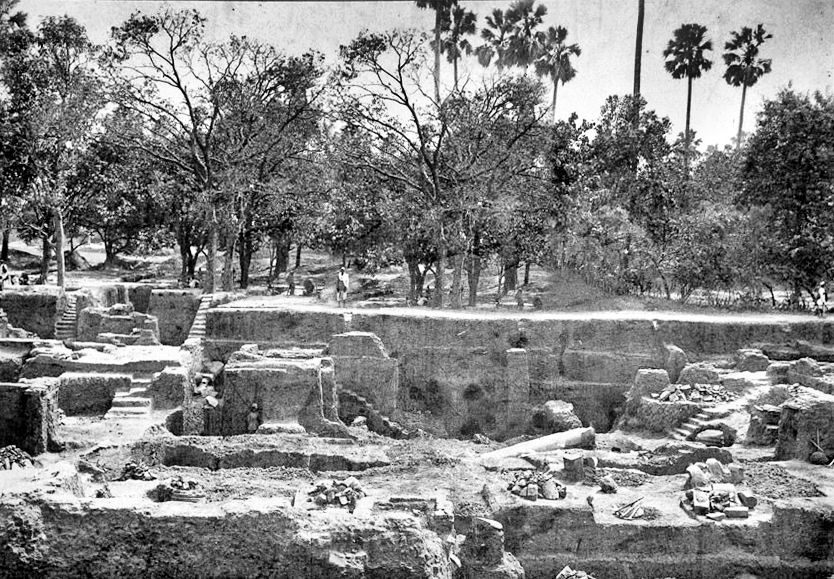
Mauryan ruins at the Kumhrar site of Pataliputra. The unique pillar that was found can be seen in the middle of the photograph.

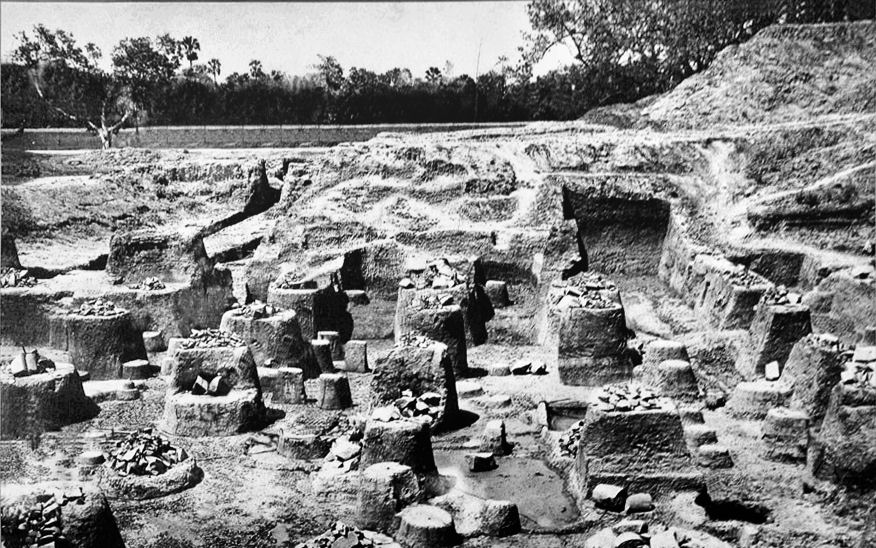
Ruins of the pillared hall at the Kumhrar site of Pataliputra.

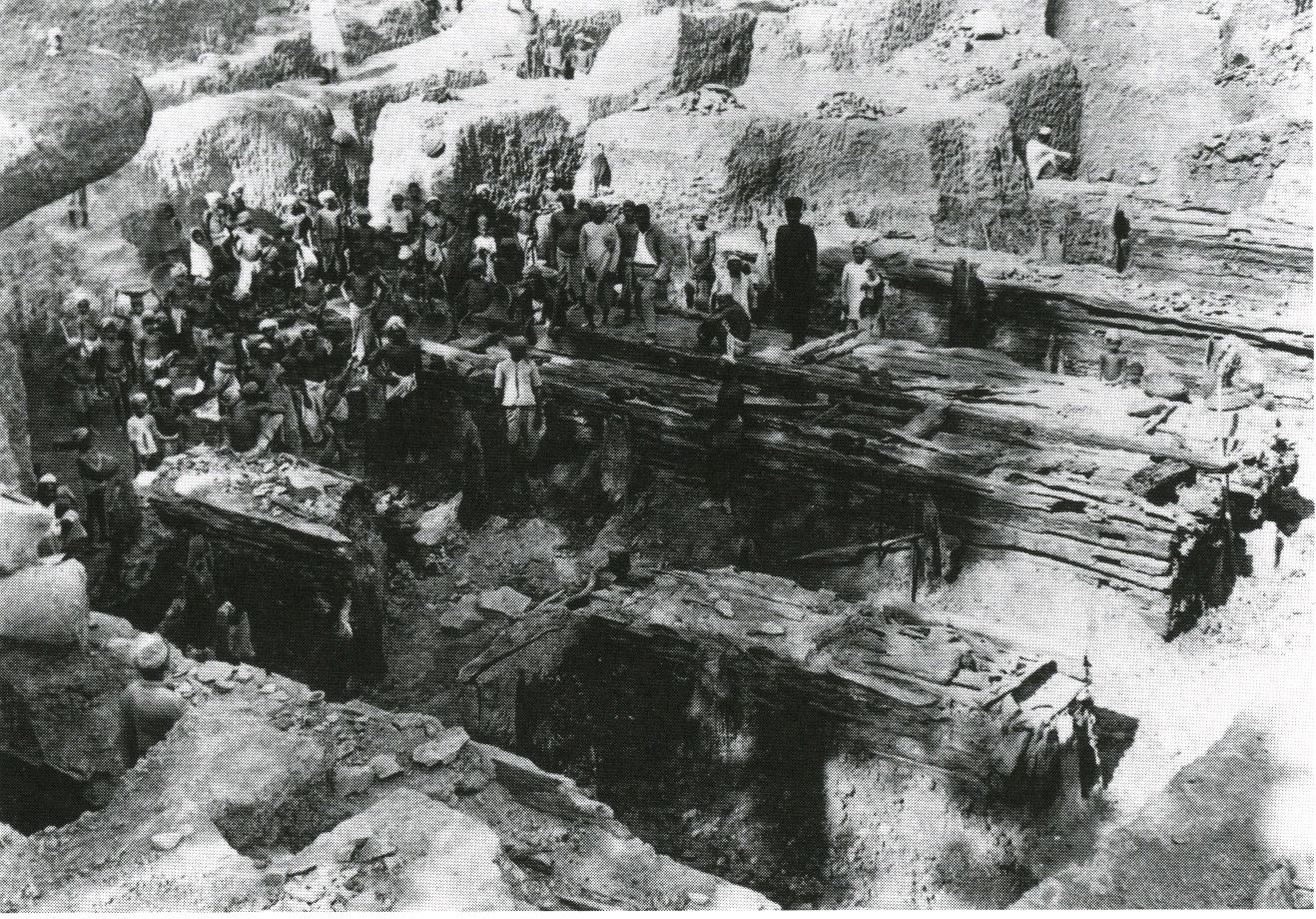
Wooden platforms just south of the hall, thought to have supported a staircase to the canal.

=== Reconstruction ===
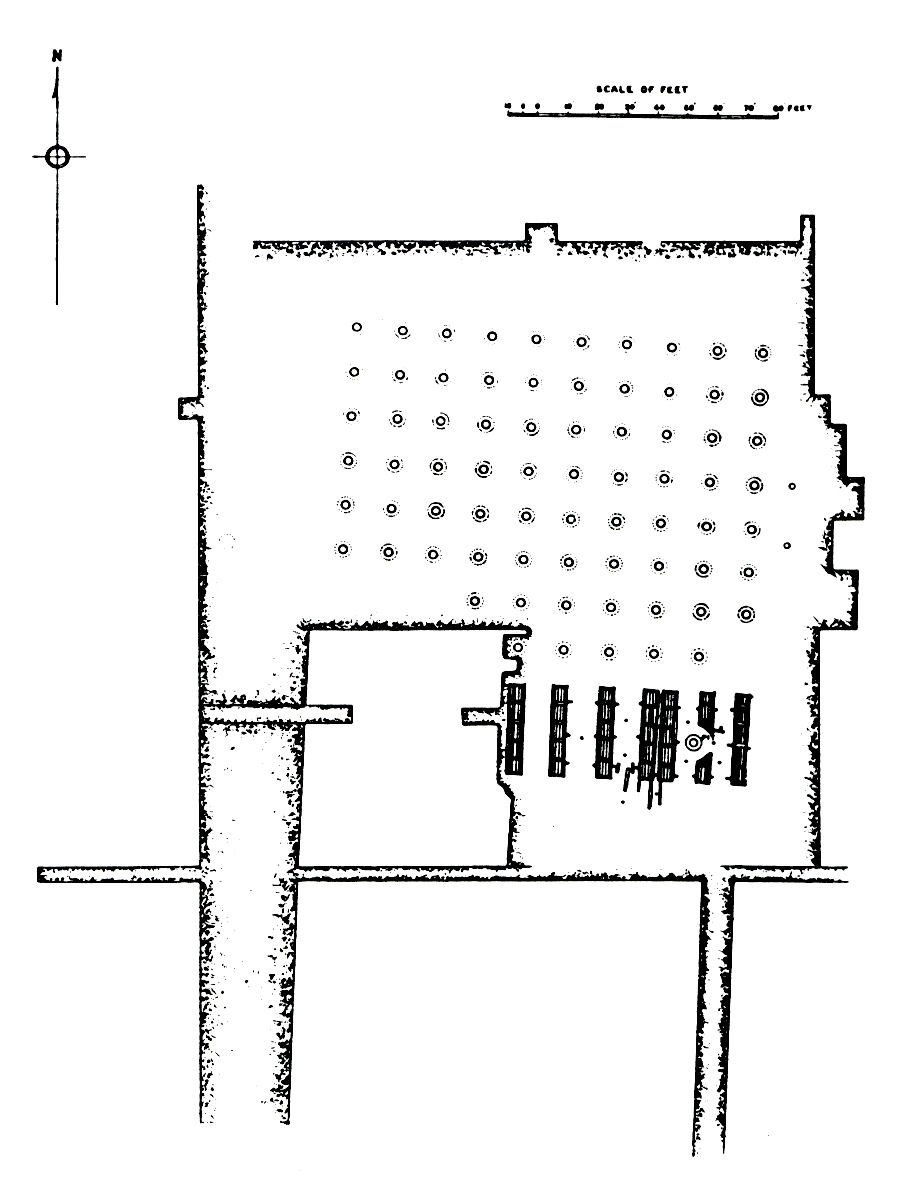
Plan of the 80-columns pillared hall.

The pillars are arranged in 8 rows of 10 pillars each. The pillars are separated with each other by a distance of 4.57 meters. Each pillar is made of black spotted buff sandstone monoliths, and was 9.75 meters in height, of which 2.74 meters were below the surface for grounding. Since no other stone works were recovered, it is thought that the pillars sustained a wooden roof, and that there were no surrounding walls, making it an open-air hall. South of the pillared hall, seven wooden platforms were excavated, which are thought to have supported a staircase going into the canal to welcome guests.

All the ruins are attributed to the Mauryan period, though historians vary regarding the use of the 80-pillar hall, some suggest that it was in this hall that Third Buddhist Council was held, in 250 BCE, at Ashokarama in Patiliputta (Pataliputra), under the reign of Mauryan Emperor, Ashoka (r. 273-232 BCE). The pillared hall seems to have been located about 350 meters south of the wooden palisades of the city of Pataliputra (discovered in the area of Bulandi Bagh), and was standing by the banks of the former Son river, and therefore cannot have been the Mauryan palace, but probably only "a pleasure hall outside the city walls".

Spooner initially thought that the pillars that were not found had sunk into the ground, but later research by Indian archaeologist Altekar showed that instead they had been removed by locals and reused for construction purposes. Altekar also thought that the compound was an isolated structure outside the city of Pataliputra, with not much around it, and that it had been burnt down during the time of the Sunga.

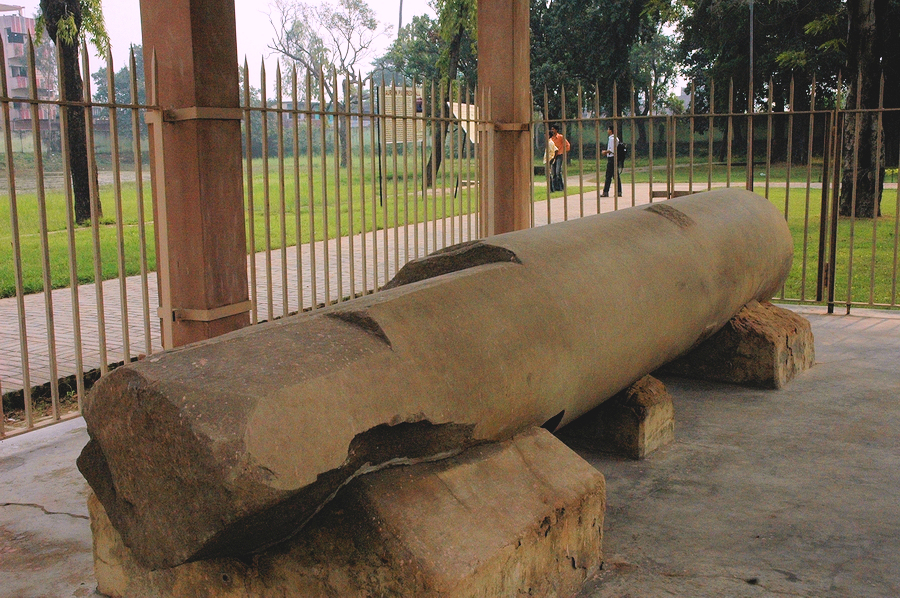
Single remaining column of the 80-column hall (this pillar was the 3rd pillar of the 6th row on the map).

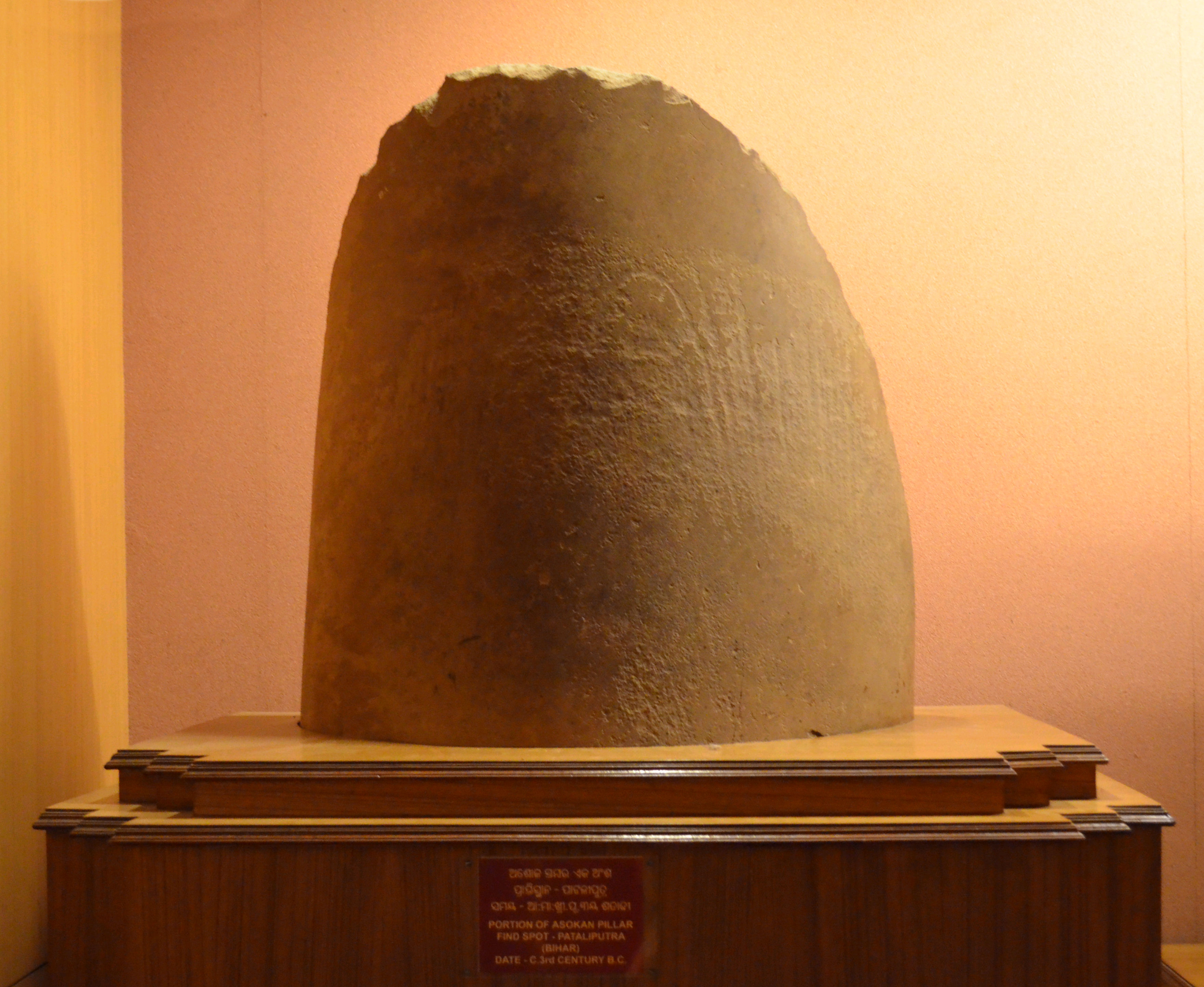
Portion of pillar, found in Pataliputra.

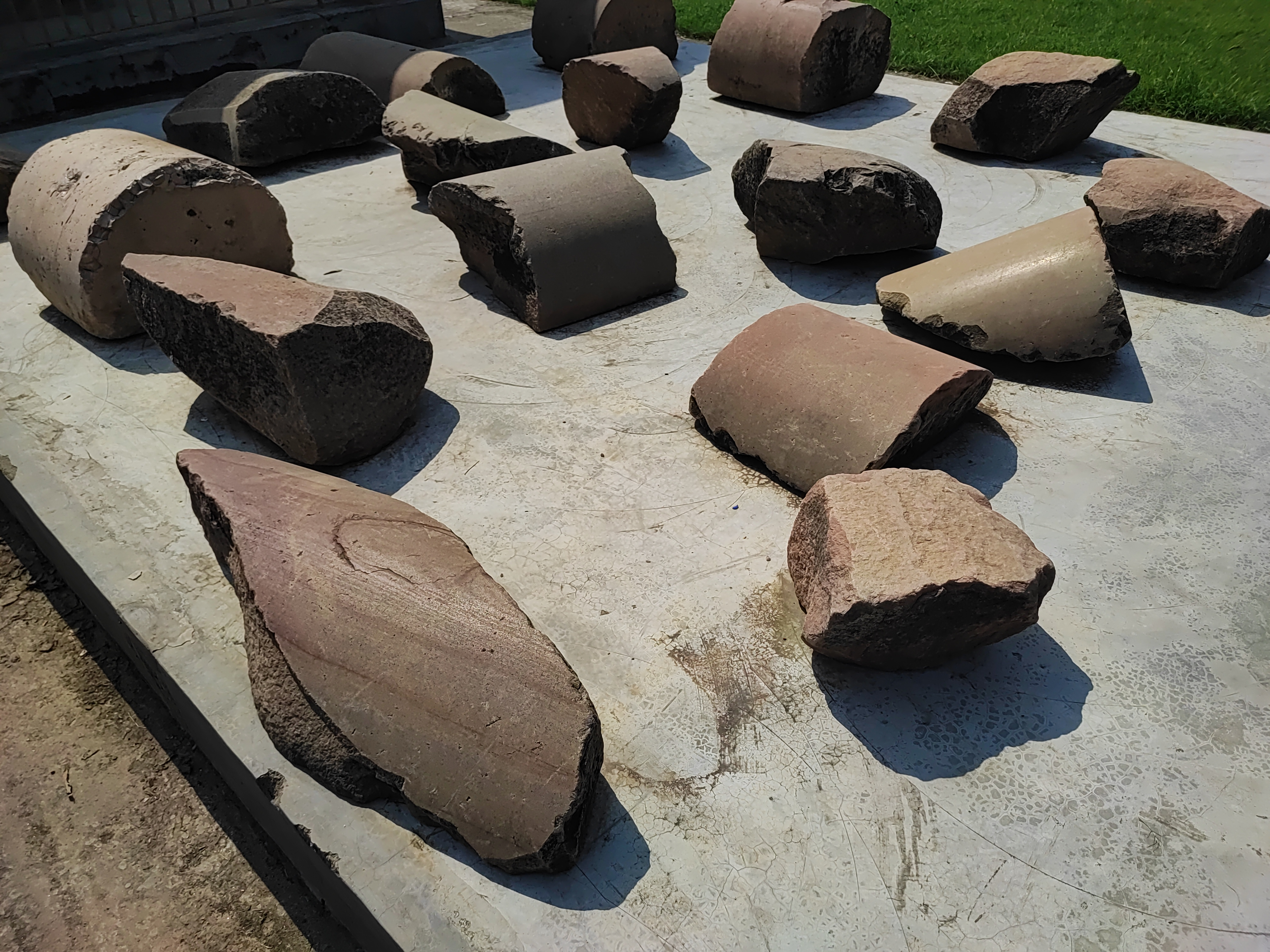
Fragments of polished pillars. Kumrahar

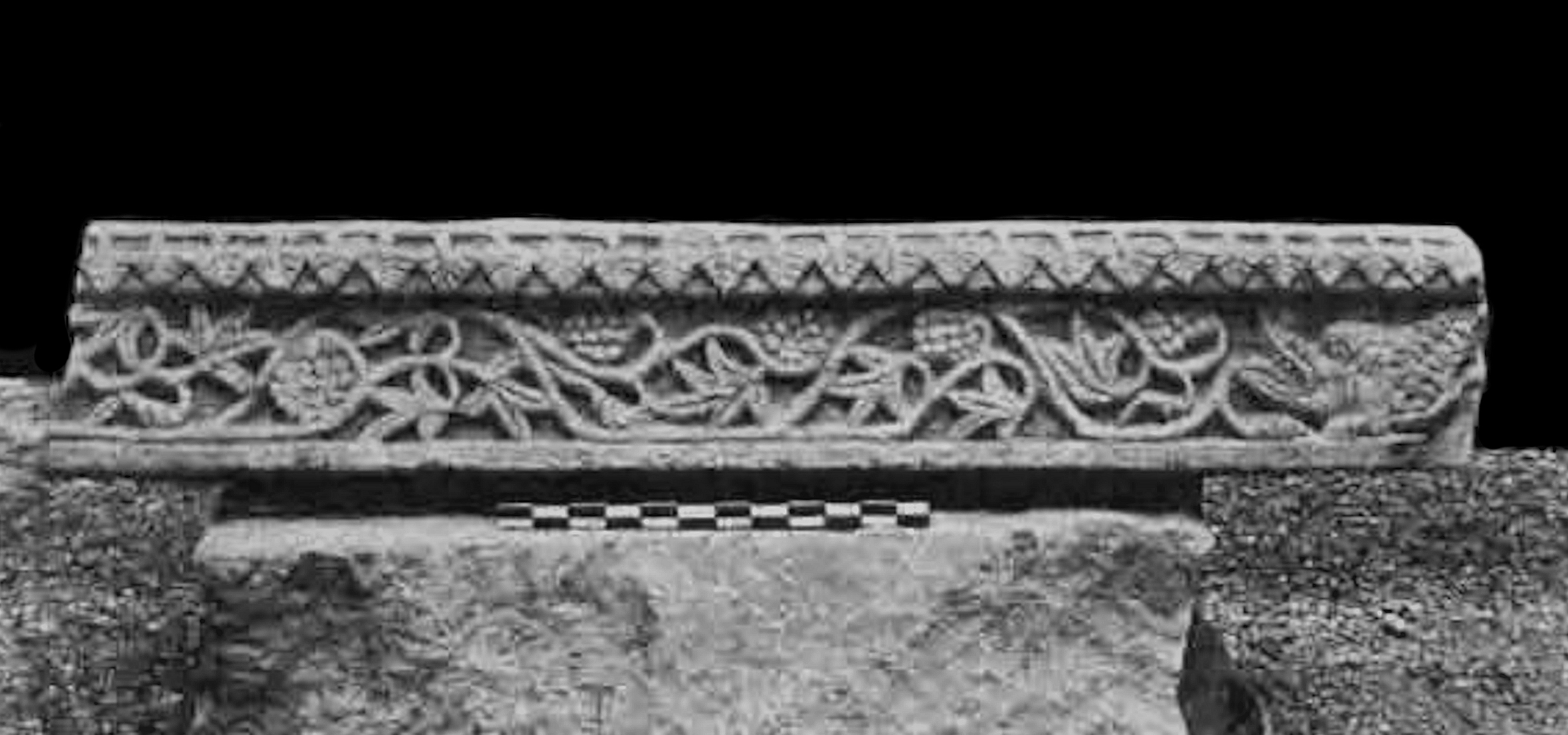
Kumrahar coping stone decorated with vine-scroll design. Dated 15O BCE to 100 CE by Altekar.

== Other structures ==
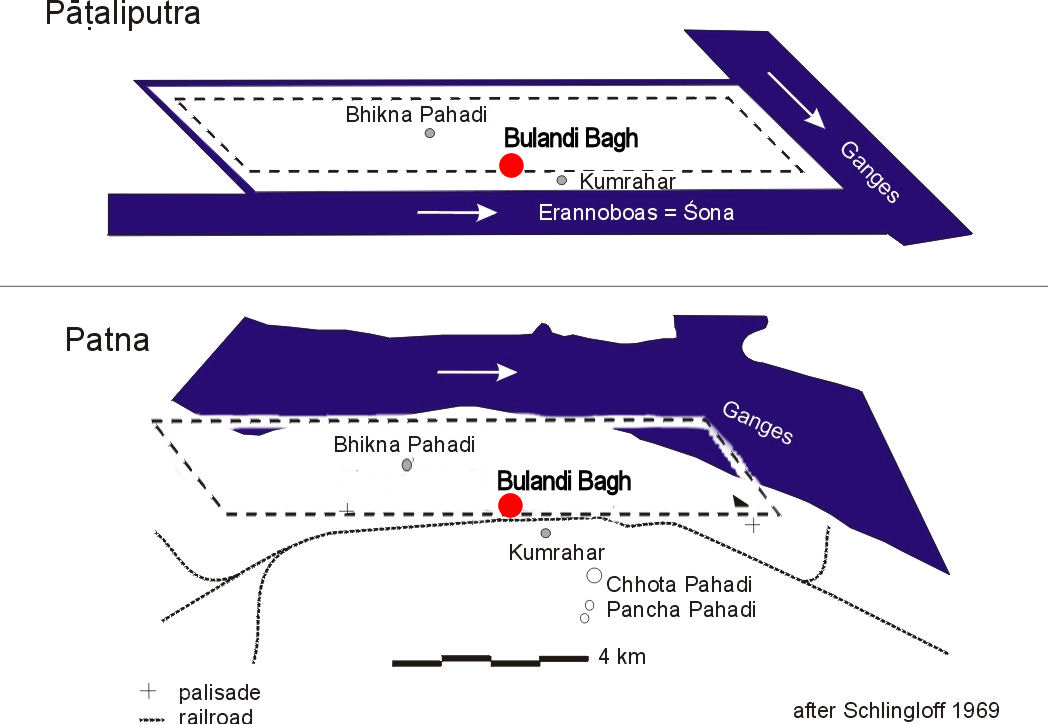
Locations of Kumhrar and Bulandi Bagh respective to ancient Pataliputra and modern Patna.

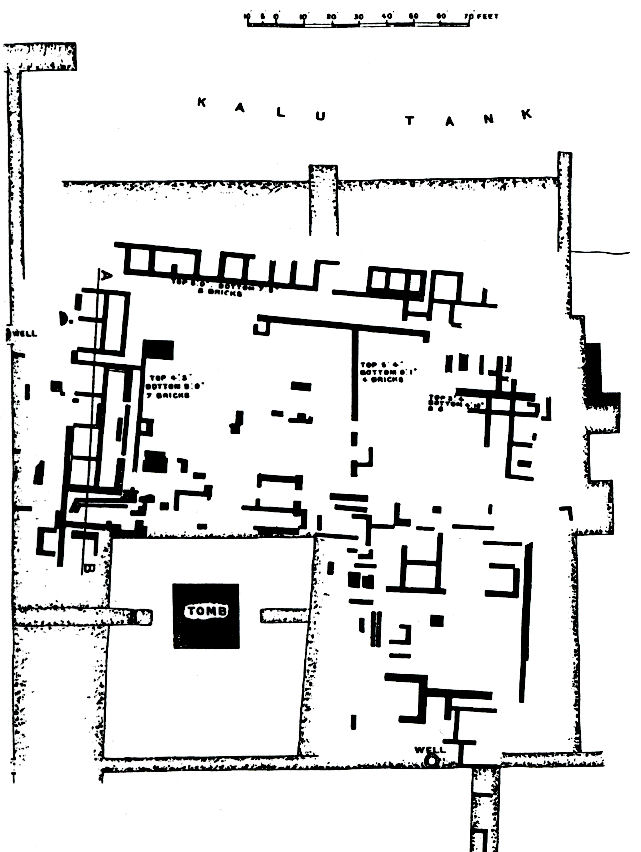
Plan of the Gupta level at Kumhrar (originally on top of the Mauryan 80-pillared hall)

Anand Bihar: The foundations of the brick Buddhist monastery were excavated, apart from wooden beams and clay figures, which are now kept for public display in the surrounding park.
Arogya Vihar: Also found during the excavations, are the presence of an Arogya Vihar headed by Dhanvantari, an early Indian medical practitioner, considered the source of Ayurveda.
Durakhi Devi Temple – Excavations in 1890s, by Laurence Waddell, revealed a detached piece of a carved stone railing of a stupa, with female figures on both the sides, giving it the name, 'Durukhi' or 'Durukhiya' (double faced) Devi, a specimen of Shunga art 2-1st century BCE. The figures are shown grabbing and breaking branches of trees, are Shalabhanjikas (the breaker of branches), the young women under a fertility ritual. These images were later brought to their present location, at Naya Tola (Kankarbagh), a kilometer west to the site, where they are presently worshipped in a temple-like structure; a replica of these figures has also been kept in Patna Museum.

Kumhrar is going to have a metro station under the Patna Metro plan.

== See also ==
- Agam Kuan (Ashoka's Hell chambers)
- Barabar Caves
- Bulandi Bagh (location of the city palisade, and the Pataliputra capital)
