= Red Line (Patna Metro) =

Red Line

Overview
- Status: Under-construction
- Locale: Patna
- Termini: Khemnichak; Danapur Cantonment
- Stations: 14

Service
- Type: Rapid transit
- System: Patna Metro
- Operator: Patna Metro Rail Corporation Limited
- Rolling stock: Titagarh Firema

Technical
- Line length: Total: 16.86 km (10.48 mi)
- Number of tracks: 2
- Character: At-grade, Underground, and Elevated
- Track gauge: 1,435 mm (4 ft 8 1/2 in) standard gauge
- Electrification: 25 kV 50 Hz AC overhead catenary

The Patna Metro Red Line, also known as the East-West Corridor, is one of the two lines currently under construction for the Patna Metro project. It stretches approximately 16.86 km with 9.36 km elevated and 7.5 km underground, connecting Danapur Cantonment to Khemnichak. The corridor features a combination of elevated and underground stations. It will have 14 stations.

== Stations ==
Red Line
#	Station name		Opening	Interchange connection	Station layout
#	English	Hindi	Opening	Interchange connection	Station layout
1	Danapur Cantonment	दानापुर छावनी	Under Construction	None	Elevated
2	Saguna Mor	सगुना मोड़	Under Construction	None	Elevated
3	RPS Mor	आर पी एस मोड़	Under Construction	None	Elevated
4	Patliputra	पाटलिपुत्र	Under Construction	None	Elevated
5	Rukanpura	रुकनपुरा	Under Construction	None	Underground
6	Raja Bazar	राजा बाजार	Under Construction	None	Underground
7	Patna Zoo	चिड़ियाघर	Under Construction	None	Underground
8	Vikas Bhawan	विकास भवन	Under Construction	None	Underground
9	Vidyut Bhawan	विद्युत भवन	Under Construction	None	Underground
10	Patna Junction	पटना जंक्शन	Under Construction	Patna Junction; Blue Line (Under construction)	Underground
11	Mithapur	मीठापुर	Under Construction	None	Elevated
12	Ramkrishan Nagar	रामकृष्ण नगर	Under Construction	None	Elevated
13	Jaganpura	जगनपुरा	Under Construction	None	Elevated
14	Khemnichak	खेमनीचक	Under Construction	Blue Line	Elevated

== See also ==
- Blue Line
- Urban rail transit in India
- List of metro systems
- Delhi Metro
