= Moin-ul-Haq Stadium metro station =

Upcoming metro station in Bihar, India

Moin-ul-Haq Stadium

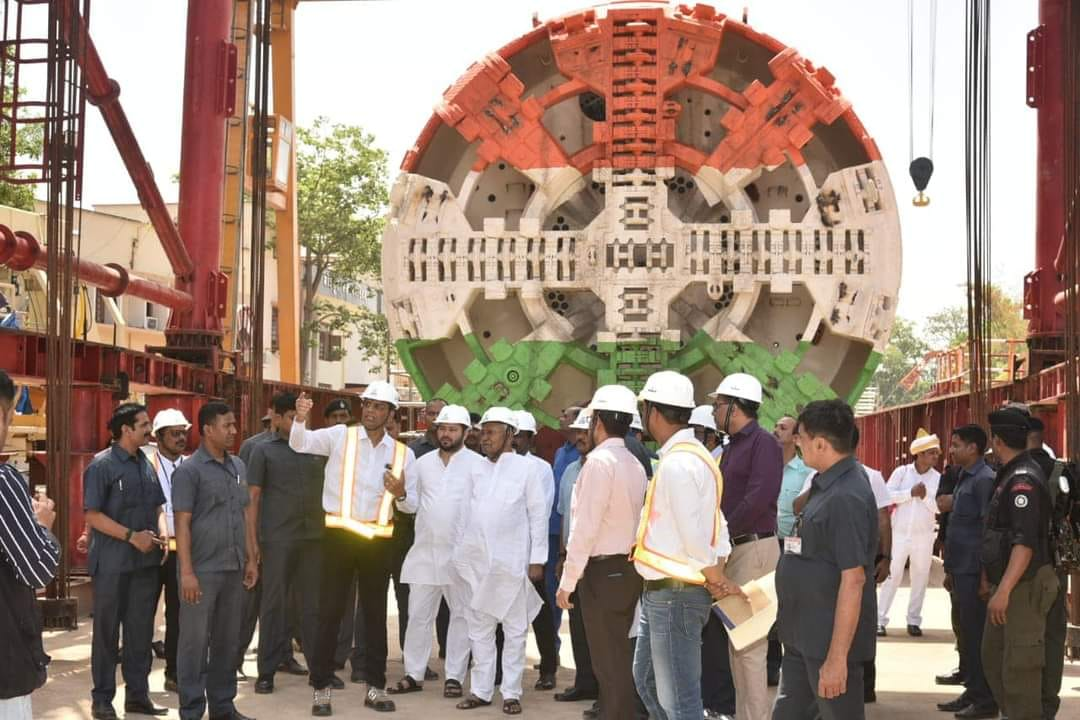
- Nitish Kumar and Tejaswi Yadav inaugurating the work of Patna Metro at Moin-ul-Haq Stadium in 2023

General information
- Location: Rajendra Nagar, Patna, Bihar, India
- Coordinates: 25°36′28″N 85°10′4″E
- System: Patna Metro station
- Operator: Patna Metro
- Tracks: 2 (TBC)

Construction
- Structure type: Underground
- Platform levels: 2 (TBC)
- Parking: (TBC)

Other information
- Status: Under Construction
- Station code: (TBC)

History
- Opening: June 2026; 2 months ago (TBC)
- Electrified: (TBC)
Route map
Location

Moin-ul-Haq Stadium is an upcoming underground metro station on the north–south corridor of the Blue Line of Patna Metro in Bihar, India.

== History ==
In August 2022, Chief Minister Nitish Kumar inaugurated the underground metro rail work at Moin-ul-Haq Stadium by unveiling the stone plaque of the underground work of Patna Metro Rail Project.

== See also ==
- List of metro systems
