= Patna Junction railway station =

Railway station in Patna, Bihar, India

PATNA JUNCTION

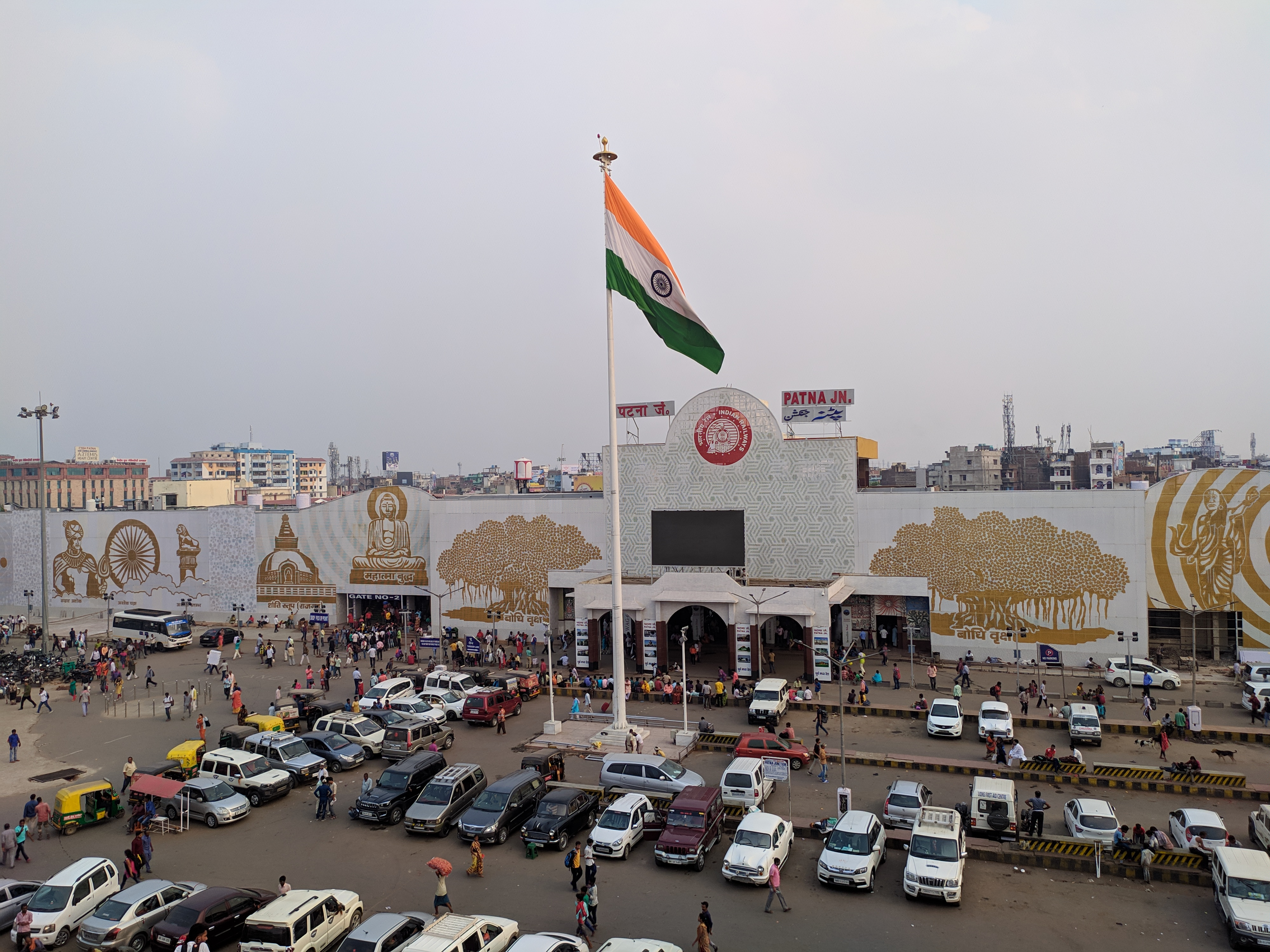
- Outside view of Patna Junction railway station

General information
- Location: Station Road, Near Mahavir Mandir, Patna- 800001 Bihar; India
- Coordinates: 25°36′10″N 85°8′15″E
- Elevation: 57 metres (187 ft)
- System: Indian Railways station
- Owner: Indian Railways
- Operator: East Central Railway
- Lines: New Delhi–Howrah main line, Patna–Sonepur–Hajipur section, Asansol–Patna section, Patna–Mughalsarai section, Patna–Gaya line,
- Platforms: 10 platforms Length– 650–700 m (2,130–2,300 ft)
- Tracks: 15
- Connections: Blue Line Red Line Patna Junction (under-construction)

Construction
- Structure type: Standard (on-ground station)
- Parking: Car parking Available
- Cycle facilities: Not available
- Accessible: Available

Other information
- Status: Functional
- Station code: PNBE
- Zone(s): East Central Railway
- Division(s): Danapur
- Classification: NSG-1
- Website: www.irctc.co.in/nget/train-search

History
- Opened: 25 December 1862; 163 years ago
- Rebuilt: 2002; 24 years ago Waiting hall 2019; 7 years ago
- Electrified: 2003–2004; 22 years ago
- Former names: Bankipore Junction

Passengers
- 2022: 26.4 lakhs per day (▲ high)
- Rank: Top 5 booking stations under Indian Railways
Services
East Central Railway
Preceding station	Indian Railways	Following station
Sachiwalay Halt towards ?	Digha, Patna Towards Ganga Rail–Road Bridge (Hajipur⬅Sonepur➡Chhapra)	Rajendra Nagar Terminal towards ?
Sachiwalay Halt towards ?	Patna–Mughalsarai section Towards Danapur/Patliputra	Rajendra Nagar Terminal towards ?
Parsa Bazar towards ?	Patna–Gaya line Towards Jehanabad	Gulzarbagh towards ?

Other services
Route map
Location
- Location within India Location within Bihar Location within Patna
- Interactive map of Patna Junction

Patna Junction (station code PNBE) is a major railway station located in the capital city of Patna in the Indian state of Bihar. It is the main railway station serving Patna (Note: Other railway station serving Patna district are: Patliputra Junction, Danapur railway station and Patna Sahib railway station.). It maintained under the Danapur division of the East Central Railway zone of the Indian Railways. Patna Junction is one of the busiest railway stations of the country.

Patna Junction railway station is connected to most of the major cities in India by the railway network. The city is a major railway hub and has five major stations: Patna Junction, Rajendranagar Terminal, Danapur railway station, Patliputra Junction and Patna Sahib station. Also 2 major railway station: Hajipur Junction and Sonpur Junction are just at a distance of 20 km from Patna. Patna is well connected with Ara, Gaya, Jehanabad, Biharsharif, Rajgir, Islampur, Sonpur, Hajipur, Muzaffarpur, Chhapra through daily passenger and express train services.

== History ==
Patna Junction railway station was opened in 1862 as Bankipore Junction in Bankipore (Bankipur) town, headquarters of the division and Patna district in Bengal, British India. The construction of railway line through Patna was started in 1855 and was completed and opened in 1862. Prior to that the transport of raw materials and finished goods was done through the Ganga river. The Danapur Division came into existence on 1 January 1925. The present Divisional Railway Managers' office building was built in 1929.

In 1948 Eastern Railway (ER) started an exclusively third class express train known as 'Janta Express' on 1 October 1948. This initially ran between Patna and Delhi and later on was extended from Delhi up to Howrah in 1949. This was the first Janta Express train in India.

In 2002 extensive redevelopment took place. The number of platform was increased from 7 to 10. A new floor was constructed in the main station building. The platforms are interconnected with three foot overbridges (FOB). The western overbridge is called the Delhi end FOB and the easternmost FOB is called Kolkata end FOB.

At the Rajendra Nagar Terminal and Patna Junction route relay interlocking (RRI) system were installed between 7 February 2012 till 12 February. The presence of RRI system allows computer operated change of tracks for running trains. The presence of RRT system improves the safety of the railway traffic in the region.

The new station façade put up in 2018-19 was designed by National Institute of Technology, Patna. There have been other efforts as well to add cultural depictions and artwork in the station.

Mahatma Gandhi came to Patna for the first time on 10 April 1917. At that time he reached Patna from Kolkata in a third class train, then Patna Junction was called Bankipur Junction.

== Facilities ==
Facilities include mechanised cleaning, free RO mineral water, waiting rooms, retiring rooms, refreshment rooms for both vegetarians and non-vegetarians, food and tea stalls, book stalls, vehicle parking etc. It has a computerised reservation facility. Vehicles are allowed to enter the station premises. During the COVID-19 pandemic, an automated Mask and Sanitizer Dispenser (MSD) machine was installed. There is a post and telegraphic office and Government Railway Police (GRP) office. Patna Junction is located close to the bus terminal and domestic airport providing transport to important destinations of Bihar. There is second exit point from Karbigahiya end of the Patna Junction. Karbigahiya is located on the south side of Patna Junction and serves as direct access point for platforms of the railway station.

To modernise the train inquiry system a call centre was opened in 2005. Automatic ticket vending machines have been installed to reduce the queue for train tickets on the station. One of the two departmental catering units of Danapur division are located at Patna Junction, the other being at Kiul Junction. Patna Junction is going to have a metro station under Patna Metro. There are a number of escalators.

Indian Railways, under its station redevelopment and beautification initiative, renovated and beautified the waiting hall which opened in 2019. It has been set up over an area of 7500 sq ft, providing seating capacity for over 300 passengers. Additionally 200 more seats are planned. The newly opened waiting hall is said to be largest waiting hall in the Indian Railways network. The new waiting hall has been provided with 7 HD screens of 65" displaying entertainment related content as well as train information 24*7. The walls of the waiting hall has been beautified to promote local art with all the walls being covered in Madhubani painting with bright and attractive colours. For the convenience of the passengers the entire waiting hall has been centrally air-conditioned. The waiting hall has also been provided with additional fans and lighted with 100 percent LED fixtures concealed in the ceiling. The station has lactation room for mothers so that the lactating mothers will be able to comfortably feed their babies in privacy. The railway station has already been fitted with high-speed wireless internet service for passengers to enjoy free Wi-Fi facility. It was the first station in India to try out linen kiosks. Indian Railways is soon going to construct Suburban Rail Terminal at Hardinge Park which is barely 900 metres west from Patna Junction.

== Rail traffic ==
Patna Junction railway station is a major station of the East Central Railways. Its location on the Delhi–Kolkata rail route, makes Patna Junction served by several Express and Superfast trains.

In 2009, the construction of Digha–Sonpur Bridge, was underway on the banks on the Ganges nearby, connected Patna to Pahleja Ghat. The railway part of bridge was opened to rail traffic from 3 February 2016 and railway started passenger service from Patliputra Junction to various railway stations on north side of Ganges in Bihar.

== Gallery ==
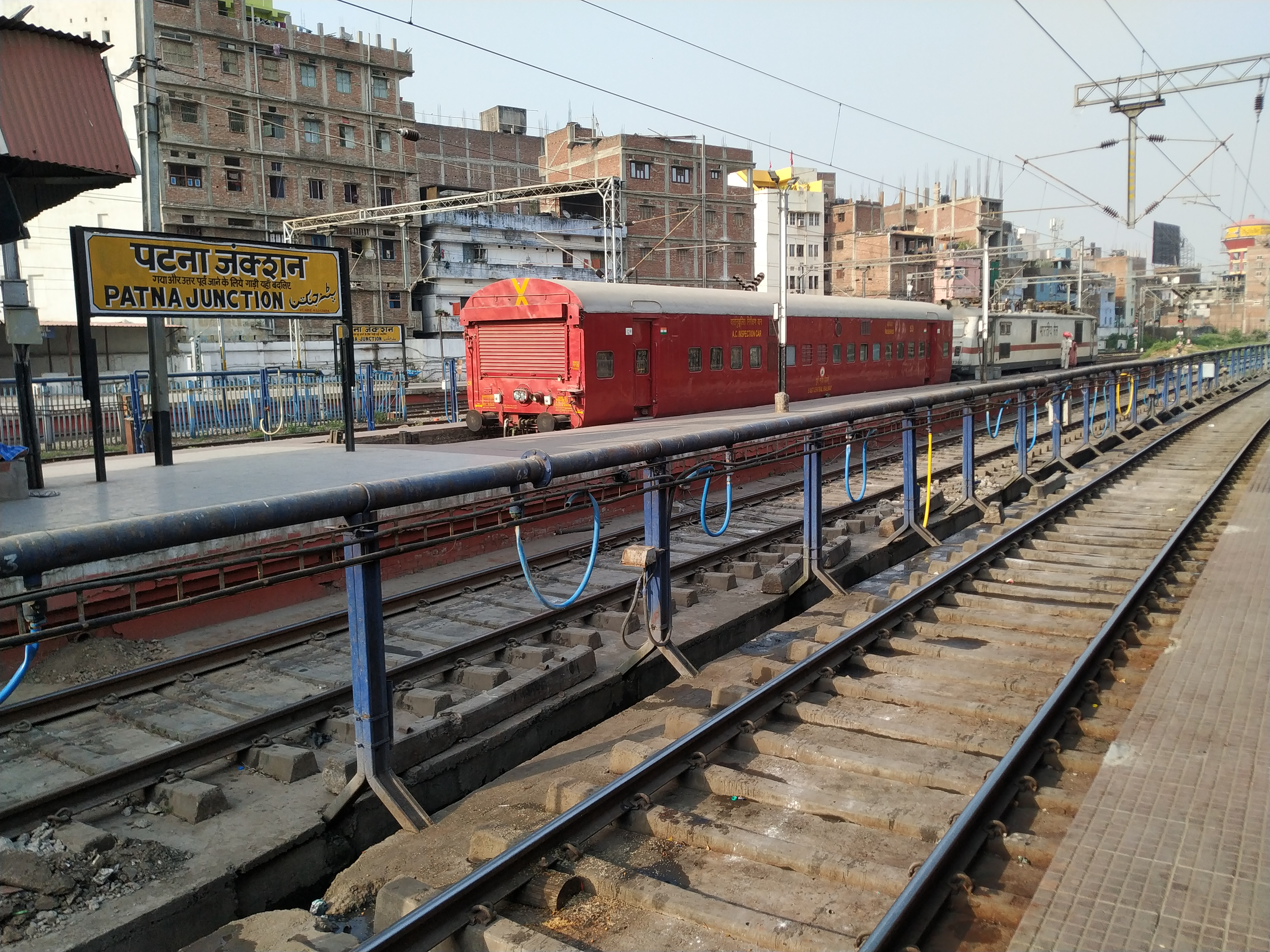
Platforms 4 to 1 in Patna Junction.

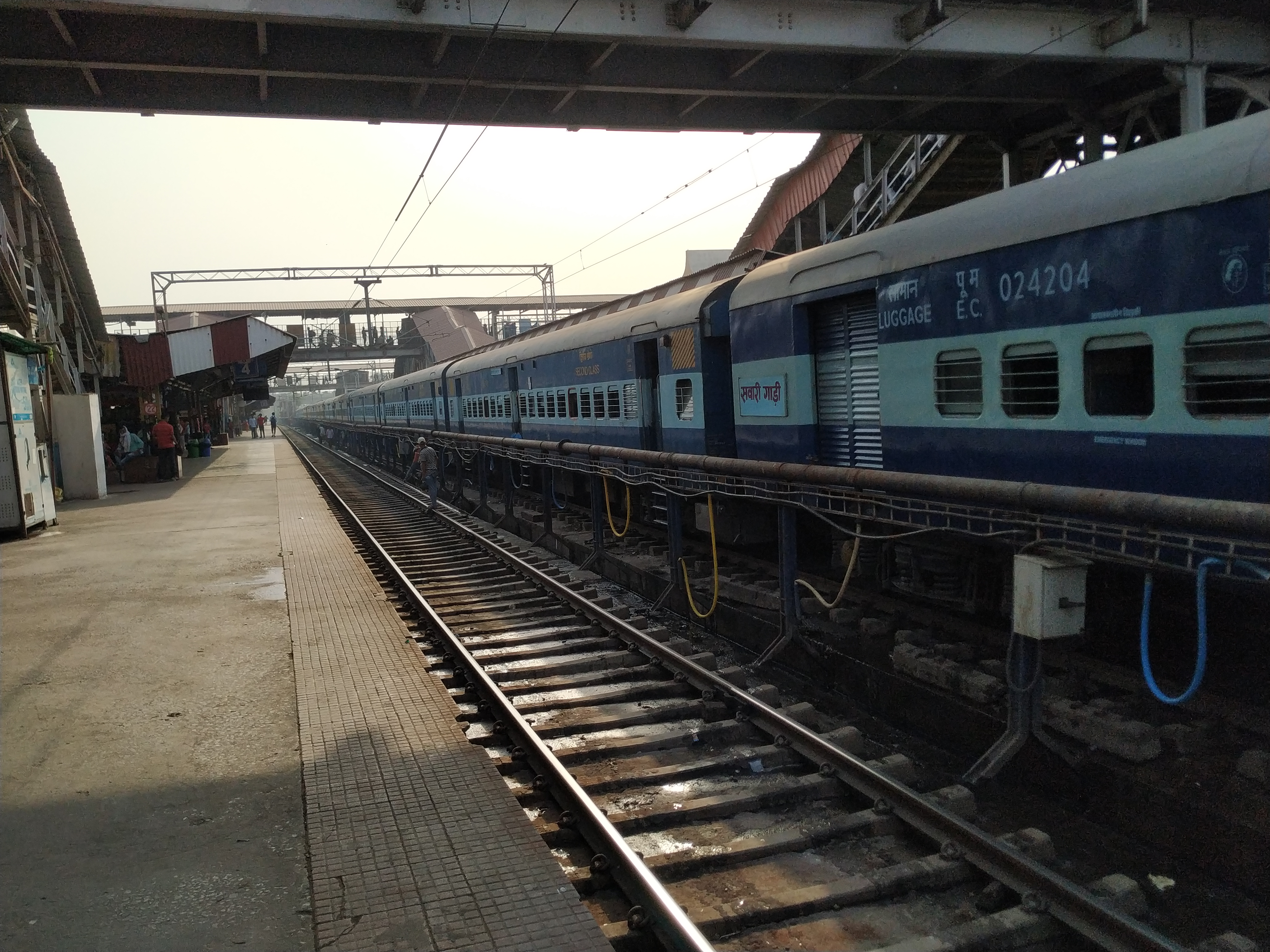
A passenger train standing on platform 3 in Patna Junction.

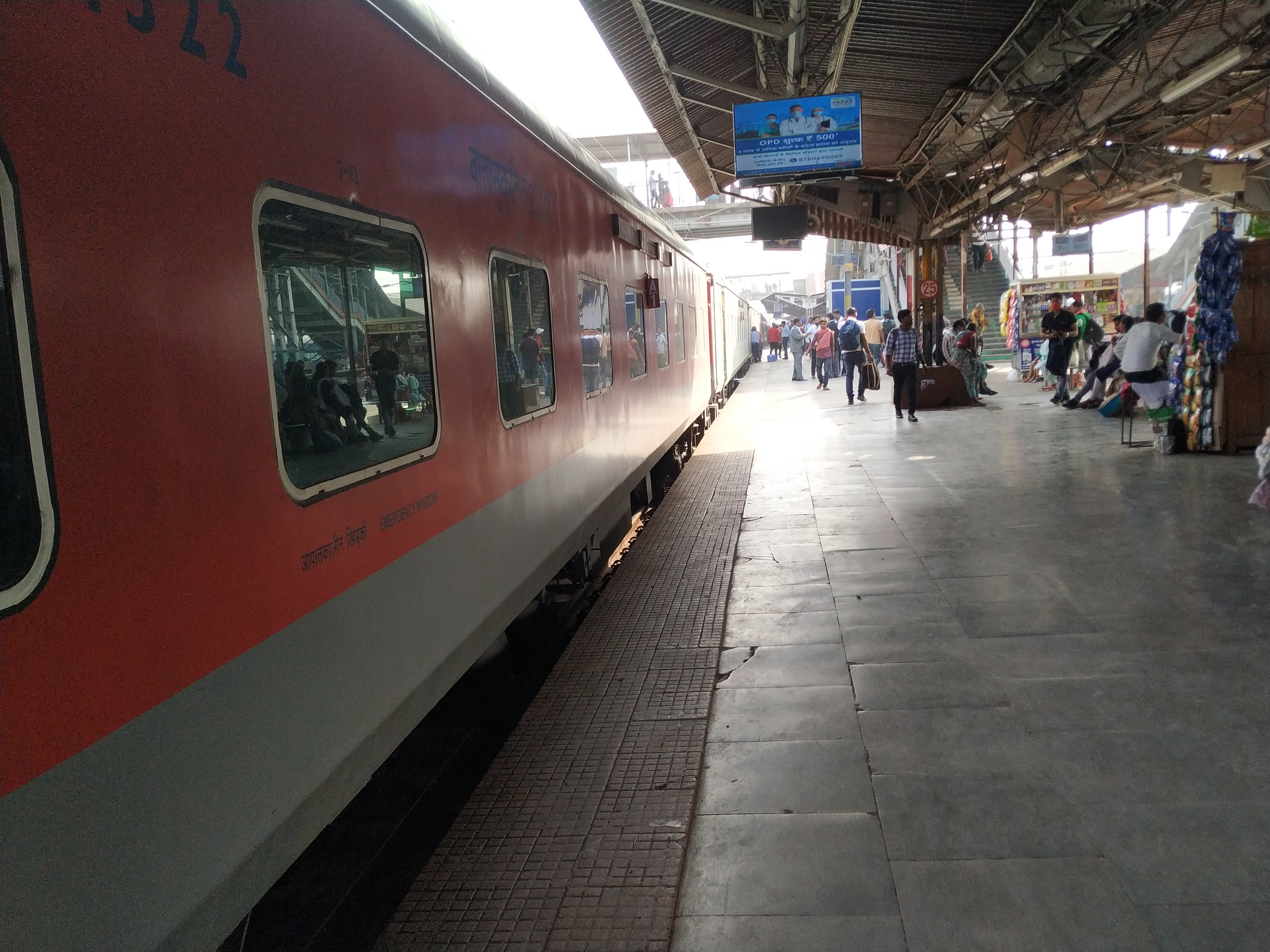
12273 Howrah-New Delhi Duronto Express standing in Patna Junction

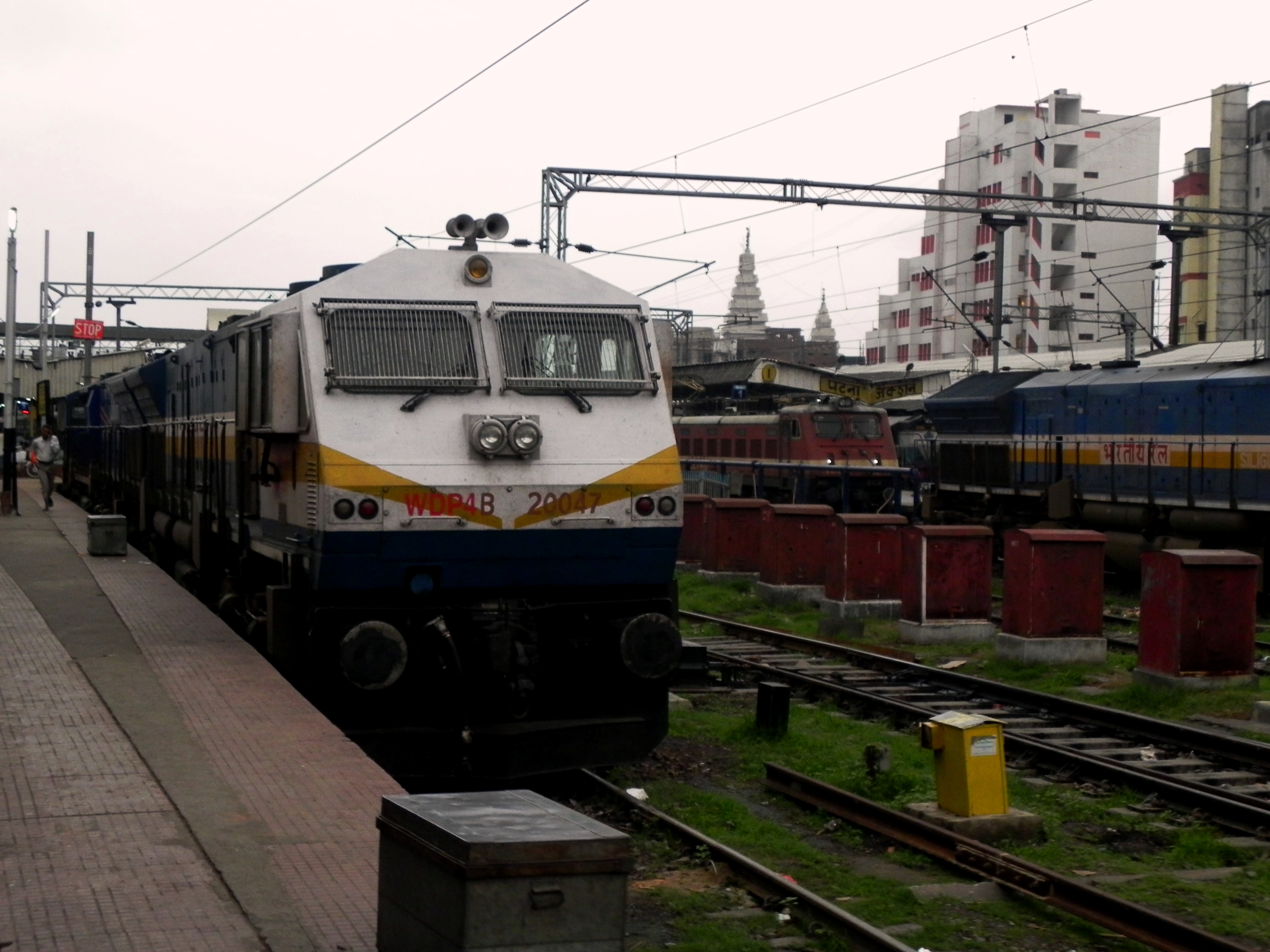
A WDP-4B class locomotive at Patna

== Trains ==
=== Trains originating from Patna ===
- Dhanbad - Patna Ganga Damodar Express
- Dhanbad - Patna Intercity Express
- Patna–Hatia Patliputra Express
- Ernakulam–Patna Superfast Express (via Asansol)
- Patna–Mumbai CSMT Superfast Express
- Patna–Kota Express
- Howrah–Patna Jan Shatabdi Express
- Patna–Ranchi Jan Shatabdi Express
- Patna–Howrah Vande Bharat Express
- Patna- Ranchi Vande Bharat Express

== Nearest airports ==
The nearest airports to Patna Junction are:

1. Lok Nayak Jayaprakash Airport, Patna 5 kilometres (3.1 mi)
2. Gaya Airport 108 kilometres (67 mi)
3. Darbhanga Airport 138 kilometres (86 mi)

== In popular culture ==
- Patna Junction was one of the filming locations for the Bollywood movie Half Girlfriend.

== See also ==
- Patna Metro

Patna travel guide from Wikivoyage
