= Patna Junction metro station =

Metro station in Bihar, India

Patna Junction

General information
- Location: Station Road, Near Mahavir Mandir, Patna- 800001 Bihar
- Coordinates: 25°36′10″N 85°8′15″E
- System: Patna Metro station
- Operator: Patna Metro
- Line: Red Line Blue Line
- Tracks: 2 (TBC)
- Connections: Patna Junction

Construction
- Structure type: Underground
- Platform levels: 2 (TBC)
- Parking: (TBC)
- Accessible: (TBC)

Other information
- Status: Under Construction
- Station code: (TBC)

History
- Opening: June 2026; 4 months ago (TBC)
- Electrified: (TBC)
Route map
Location

Patna Junction is an upcoming underground interchange metro station between the Red Line and Blue Line of Patna Metro in Bihar, India. It will provide connectivity to Patna Junction railway station.

The underground metro station is being built with four entry and exit points, eight lifts and eight escalators. Its concourse will be located about 8 metres below ground level. The station will have two platforms, with the Corridor II platform constructed above the Corridor I platform. A subway link between Patna Junction railway station and the metro station is also planned.

== See also ==
- List of metro systems
