= Patna Metro =

Rapid transit system in Bihar, India

Patna Metro

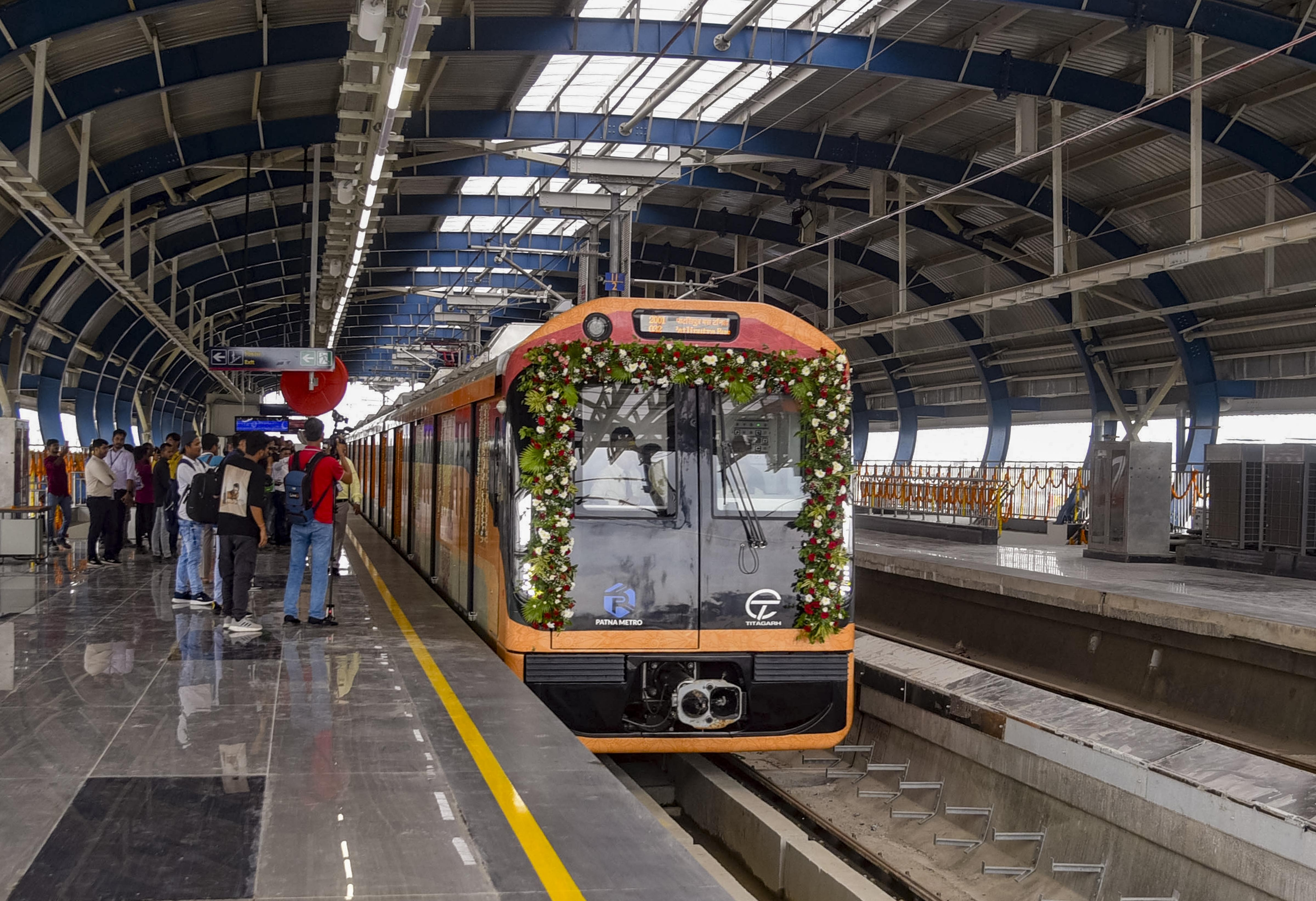

Overview
- Owner: Patna Metro Rail Corporation Limited (PMRCL)
- Locale: Patna, Bihar, India
- Transit type: Rapid transit
- Number of lines: 2
- Line number: Operational; Blue Line; Under construction Red Line
- Number of stations: 4
- Headquarters: Indira Bhawan, Boring Canal Road, Patna
- Website: patnametro.bihar.gov.in

Operation
- Began operation: 6 October 2025; 13 months ago
- Operators: Delhi Metro Rail Corporation (DMRC); Patna Metro Rail Corporation (PMRC)
- Headway: 20 minutes

Technical
- System length: 6.2 km (3.9 mi) (operational)
- No. of tracks: 2
- Track gauge: 1,435 mm (4 ft 8 1/2 in) standard gauge
- Electrification: 25 kV 50 Hz AC overhead catenary
- Average speed: 30 km/h (19 mph)
- Top speed: 80 km/h (50 mph)
System map
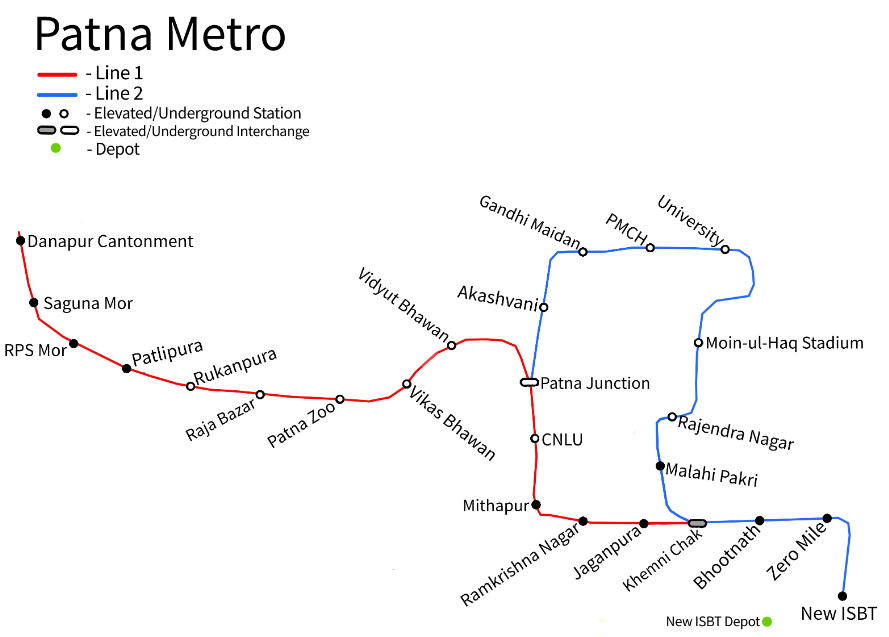

Patna Metro (Patna MRTS) is a rapid transit system constructed in the city of Patna, India. Construction will be completed over five phases, and the transit system would be owned and operated by the state-run Patna Metro Rail Corporation. In the first phase, five stations of Patna Metro is operational on 6th October 2025. Patna MRTS, constructed under a public-private partnership model, is estimated to cost ₹13,365.77 crore (US$1.4 billion). This cost excludes land acquisition cost, which will be paid for by the Bihar government. The first phase (consisting of the east–west and north–south corridors) will include both a 15.36 km (9.54 mi) elevated track and a 16.30 km (10.13 mi) underground track.

In January 2022, Larsen & Toubro (L&T) secured the order from metro operator Delhi Metro Rail Corporation (DMRC) for the design and construction of the Corridor-2 of Phase-1 of Patna Metro. L&T classifies this contract, worth ₹1,989 crore (US$210 million), as a significant order. The major scope of work for the project comprises six underground metro stations: Rajendra Nagar, Moin-Ul-Haq Stadium, Patna Science College, Patna Medical College and Hospital, Gandhi Maidan and Akashvani of Corridor-2.

== Background ==
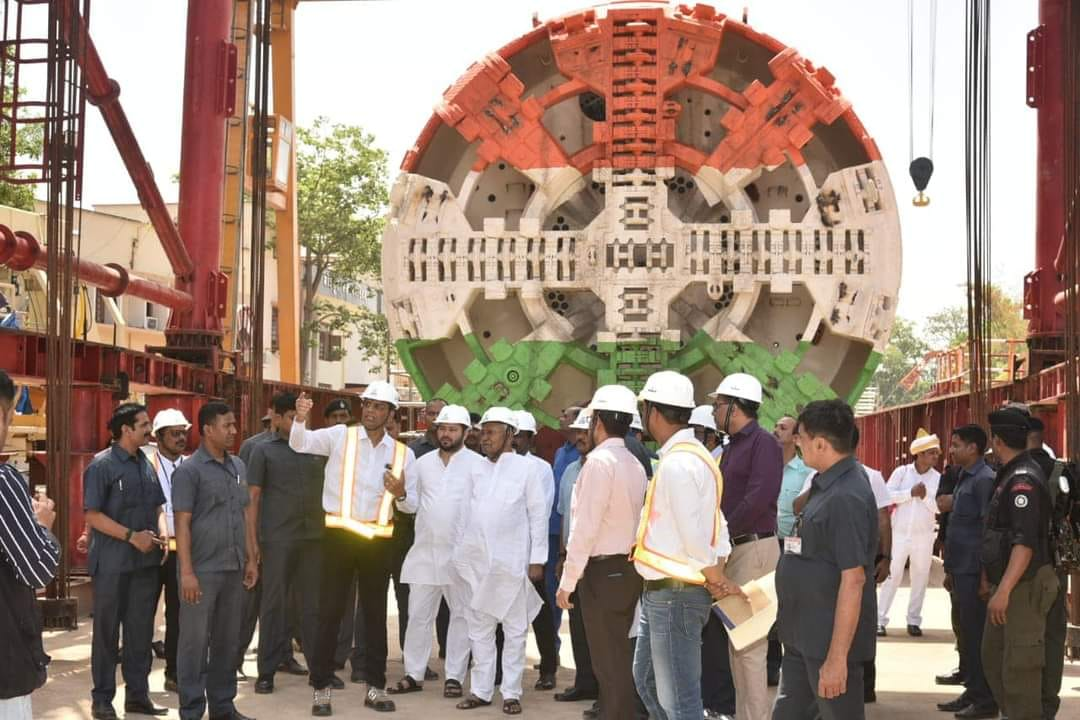
Nitish Kumar and Tejaswi Yadav inaugurating the work of Patna Metro in 2023.

Rising traffic led to a proposal for a rapid public transportation system in Patna. In November 2011, Union Urban development minister Kamal Nath said that all cities with a population of more than two million people would get a metro corridor. Patna has a population of a little over two million, making it eligible for a metro service. The Bihar urban development department is the nodal agency for Patna Integrated Mass Rapid Transport System (PIMRTS). The Bihar government decided to launch either a metro or monorail system in Patna by 2015. Metro rail was found more viable option for the city than monorail due to the load factor. The planning commission extended its technical support to the proposed metro project.

On 11 June 2013, the Bihar cabinet approved the proposal to prepare a Detailed Project Report (DPR) for a metro service in Patna. Rail India Technical and Economic Service (RITES) was selected for the purpose, and sanctioned ₹2.52 crore as a consultancy fee to RITES. On 18 June 2013, the Government of Bihar signed a Memorandum of Understanding with the consulting firm, RITES, for a feasibility study and detailed project report preparation for the Patna Metro railway project. Under the agreement, RITES would be required to submit the feasibility report by the first week of December 2013 and the DPR by February 2014. RITES's work on the project includes identifying the mass transit corridors based on a traffic-demand study, a topographic survey and a soil survey. The project is expected to be built and operated on a Public Private Partnership model. The cost of Phase 1 is estimated to be ₹13,411.24 crore.

In June 2014, the project received the green light. The Patna Metro Train Corporation was to be created before 15 August 2014. A report for the project, planned to proceed in four stages, was due on 31 October 2014. The project received the central government's approval on 6 February 2019 and Prime Minister Narendra Modi laid the foundation stone on 17 February. In November 2019, Delhi Metro Rail Corporation unveiled changes in the project's Detailed Project Report and the alignment of both lines. The changes led to the creation of a second interchange at Khemni Chowk, the elimination of Line-1's depot at Aitwarpur, and the addition of two new stations at Ramkrishna Nagar and Jaganpura.

An agreement was signed between Patna Metro and Japan International Cooperation Agency for a loan of ₹5,520.93 crore (US$590 million), which was 60% of the cost of the project. The corridors have 24 metro stations together, as well as Patna station and Khemnichak interchange station. In July 2021, PMRC organized a competition to design the logo of the Patna Metro, inviting the public to participate with prizes for the best submissions. On 29 March 2023, Japan committed ₹5,509 crore (US$590 million) for the Patna Metro Rail Project. On 7 April 2023, Chief Minister Nitish Kumar released the official logo of Patna Metro; launching the 2nd tunnel boring machine near Moin-ul-Haque stadium in Patna for construction of the underground section of the project.

== Construction phases ==
=== Phase 1 ===
==== Red Line (Corridor 1) ====
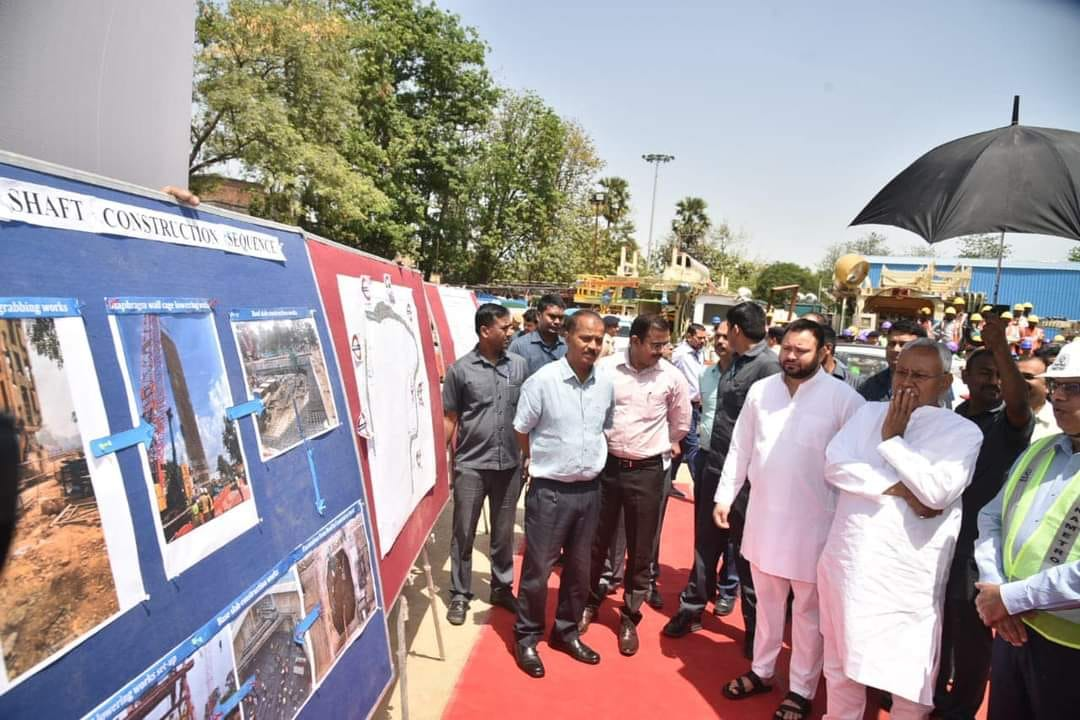
Nitish Kumar and Tejaswi Yadav examining the work of Patna Metro in April 2023

YFC Projects, a construction company based in Gurgaon, India, won the contract to build the 8 km (4.97 mi) elevated section of Corridor 1. The first elevated section, 4 km (2.49 mi) from Danapur Cantonment station to Patliputra ramp (formerly IAS Colony), will comprise 4 stations. The first corridor will start from near Kendriya Vidyalaya Danapur Cantt and will be elevated till near Gola Road before Patna Canal (Rupaspur Canal). The majority of the stretch on Corridor I is underground due to Rupaspur railway overbridge (RoB) and Jagdeopath-Sheikhpura Mor flyover. Patna Metro alignment will be 20 m (65 ft 7 in) beneath Bailey Road on Corridor I. The second elevated section will be 4 km (2.49 mi), between the Mithapur ramp and Khemni Chak station, an interchange of the Patna Junction Railway Station and the New ISBT Line 2. The 8 km (4.97 mi) underground section of Line 1, stretching from Rukanpura station to Patna Junction station, has not been awarded yet. KEC International will be in charge of the network's electrification, cabling and substation work.

==== Blue Line (Corridor 2) ====
NCC Limited and IB Infrastructure started piling and pier work for the 6.107 section of Corridor 2. Within this section, five elevated stations will be built between Malahi Pakri and New ISBT. 308 U-girders are constructed in the priority corridor comprising five metro stations: Malahi Pakri, Khemnichak, Bhootnath, Zero Mile and Patliputra Bus Terminal. The rest of the 7.94 km (4.93 mi) section of Corridor 2 will be underground; a ramp is to be constructed before the Rajendra Nagar metro station. A total of seven stations will be underground for Corridor 2; an underground interchange to be built at the Patna Junction station. The total length of Corridor 2 will be 14.05 km, with a total of twelve stations. For the 8 km underground section of Corridor 2, Larsen & Toubro won the bid to build bored twin tunnels, the ramp at Rajendra Nagar, and six underground stations. The underground construction for Corridor 2 is expected to cost ₹1,958 crore ($26.25 million) and completed over three-and-a-half years. This was the last civil package awarded for Line 2 after package one for the elevated section of Line 2.

=== Future phases ===
The second phase, between Bypass Chowk Mithapur to Didarganj via Transport Nagar, along NH 30 Bypass for 16.75 kilometres (10.41 mi); it will be elevated along Bypass Road. The third phase, between Bypass Chowk Mithapur to Phulwari Shariff AIIMS via Anisabad along NH 30 Bypass is 18.75 kilometres (11.65 mi) long, and will be elevated along Bypass Road. The fourth phase is from Didarganj to Fatuha junction.

=== Depot ===
Patna Metro will only have one depot, built at SH-1, Bairiya Chak in Sampatchak at Paijawa, near the Patliputra Bus Terminal. Both Corridor 1 and 2's depots will be the same. The depot facilities for Danapur-Mithapur-Khemni Chak of the Corridor I and Patna railway station-New ISBT of the Corridor II are proposed to be constructed near SH-1, Bairiya Chak in Sampatchak, Paijawa. The depot will have two workshop bays, three inspection bays, eight stabling bays, which can accommodate 32 three-coach trains and an auto-coach washing plan. The administrative area will consist of an auditorium, training school, canteen, and operational control centre. An auxiliary sub-station of 2500 KVA capacity is planned for catering to the power supply requirement of the depot. The work is likely to be completed by 2027. The estimated cost of building the depot is ₹143 crore ($19.17 million).

The government of Bihar has acquired 76 acres (30.5 ha) at Bairiya Chak. Of this land, 47.4 acres (19.2 ha) are proposed for metro rail depot; the remaining areas are for property development. Land acquisition started for the depot and will be completed within a few months. KEC International won the bid to install standard-gauge ballasted tracks inside the depot. The construction contract of the New ISBT depot was awarded to Quality Buildcon in December 2020. An earth road was under construction in late 2022 to ease material transport between the Fatuha casting yard (NCC Limited Casting Yard) and metro ISBT depot. Following road construction, the batching plant at the casting yard will start functioning.

== Lines ==
=== Red Line ===
The Red Line (Corridor 1) is an under-construction east–west corridor of the Patna Metro, connecting Danapur with Khemni Chak via Mithapur. It has a planned length of 17.932 km.

=== Blue Line ===
The Blue Line (Corridor 2) is a partially operational north–south corridor of the Patna Metro, connecting Patna Junction with Patliputra Bus Terminal (New ISBT) via Gandhi Maidan. It has a planned length of 14.575 km. Metro services were extended to Malahi Pakri on 2 July 2026.

== Network ==
Patna Metro
No.	Line Name	Terminal		Stations	Length	First Operation	Last Extension
1	Blue Line	Malahi Pakri	Patliputra Bus Terminal	4	6.2 km (3.9 mi)	7 October 2025	2 July 2026
Total				4	6.2 km (3.9 mi)		

== See also ==
- Urban rail transit in India
  - Gaya Metro
  - Darbhanga Metro
  - Muzaffarpur Metro
