= Bailey Road, Patna =

Bailey Road Nehru Path
- Neighbourhood
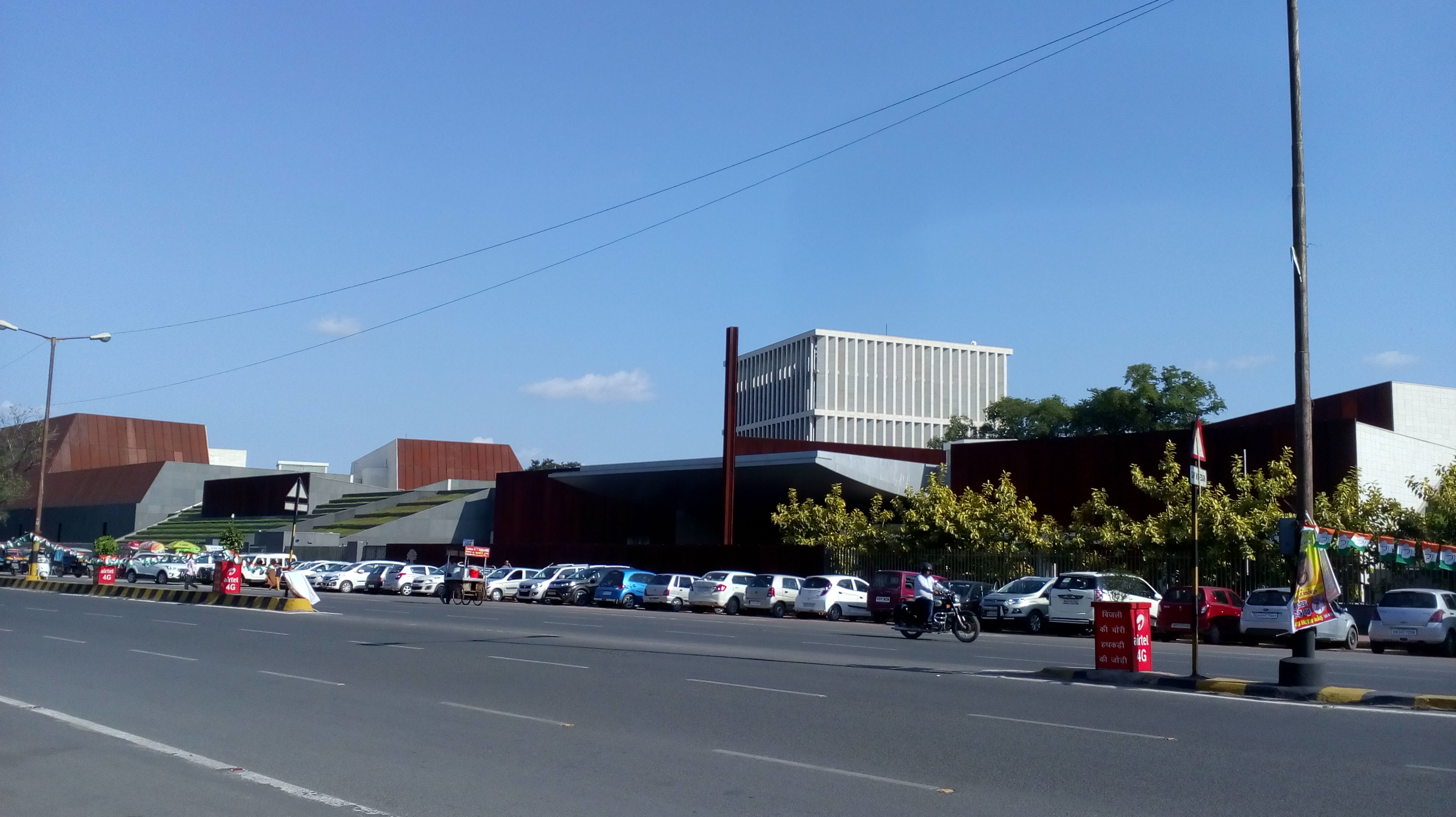
- The Bihar Museum as seen from Bailey Road

- Location in Patna, India
- Coordinates: 25°36′37″N 85°7′55″E
- Country: India
- State: Bihar
- Metro: Patna

Languages
  - Spoken: Hindi, English, Magadhi
- Time zone: UTC+5:30 (IST)
- PIN: 800014-15
- Planning agency: Patna Metropolitan Area Authority
- Civic agency: Patna Municipal Corporation

Bailey Road (also known as Nehru Path) is a road and neighbourhood in Patna, India. It connects Patna with Danapur. It starts near Income Tax Golambar and ends in Danapur, running through the heart of the city. It is one of the most important roads in the city. Many important landmarks like Patna High Court, Patna Women's College, Patna Secretariat, Patna Zoo, Patna Airport, Bihar Museum etc. are situated beside or near to this road. Bailey Road was officially renamed as Jawahar Lal Nehru Marg, but this road is still widely known as Bailey Road. Now, this road has been renamed as Nehru Path by the government of Bihar. This area is served by Shastrinagar Police Station of Patna Police.

== History ==
Under the British Raj, Patna gradually started to attain its lost glory and emerged as an important and strategic centre of learning and trade in India. When the Bengal Presidency was partitioned in 1912 to carve out a separate province, Patna was made the capital of the new province of Bihar and Orissa. The city limits were stretched westwards to accommodate the administrative base, and the township of Bankipore took shape along the Bailey Road (originally spelt as Bayley Road, after the first Lt. Governor of Bihar and Orissa, Sir Steuart Colvin Bayley). This area was called the New Capital Area.

== Patna Metro stations ==
Patna Metro alignment for Corridor I (Red Line) will be 20 m beneath Bailey Road. The Metro stations constructed along Bailey Road are : Danapur, Saguna Mor, RPS Mor, Patliputra, Raja Bazar, Patna Zoo, Vikas Bhawan, Vidyut Bhawan.

== Lohia Path Chakra ==
Lohia Path Chakra is a road underpass to reduce traffic congestion on Bailey Road. The elevated portion of the Lohia Path Chakra 2.0 on Bailey Road is a six-lane road starting from Bihar Museum to Atal Path, and was inaugurated by Chief Minister Nitish Kumar on 14 August 2023. The underpass is based on swap and grade-separated U-turn based multi-sectional interchange technology and with the swap technology, commuters change their lane.

== Landmarks ==
- Patna Planetarium
- Income tax Office
- Mount Carmel High School, Patna
- J.D. Women's College, Patna
- Patna Women's College
- Eco Park
- Bihar Public Service Commission Office
- Patna Zoo
- Sardar Patel Bhavan, Bihar Police headquarter
- Patna Golf Club
- Kendriya Vidyalaya, Bailey Road
- IGIMS
- Paras Healthcare
- Delhi Public School, Patna (Junior wing)
- Bihar Museum
- Patna High Court
- Patliputra Junction

== Gallery ==
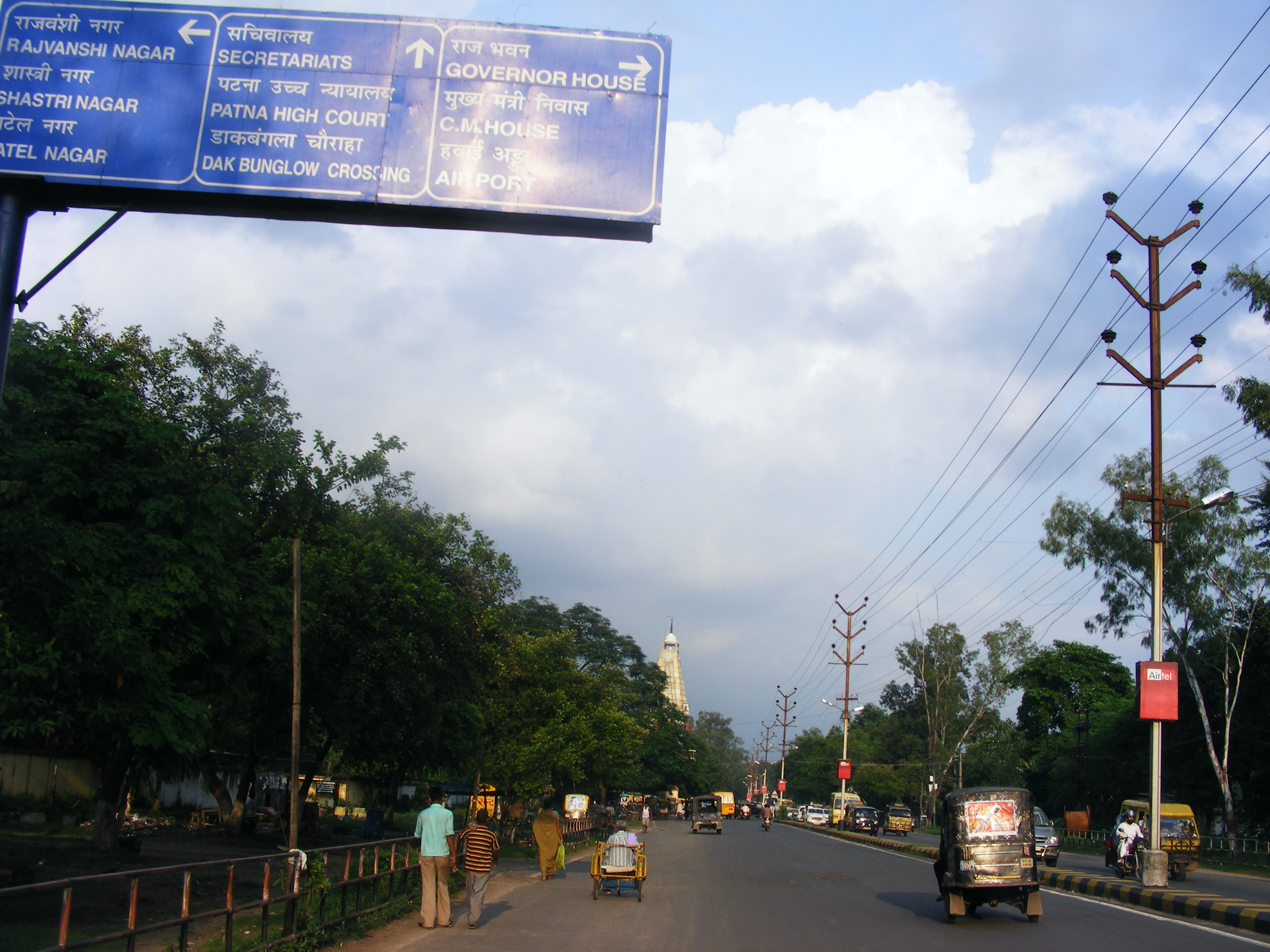
a directional sign over Bailey Road, Patna

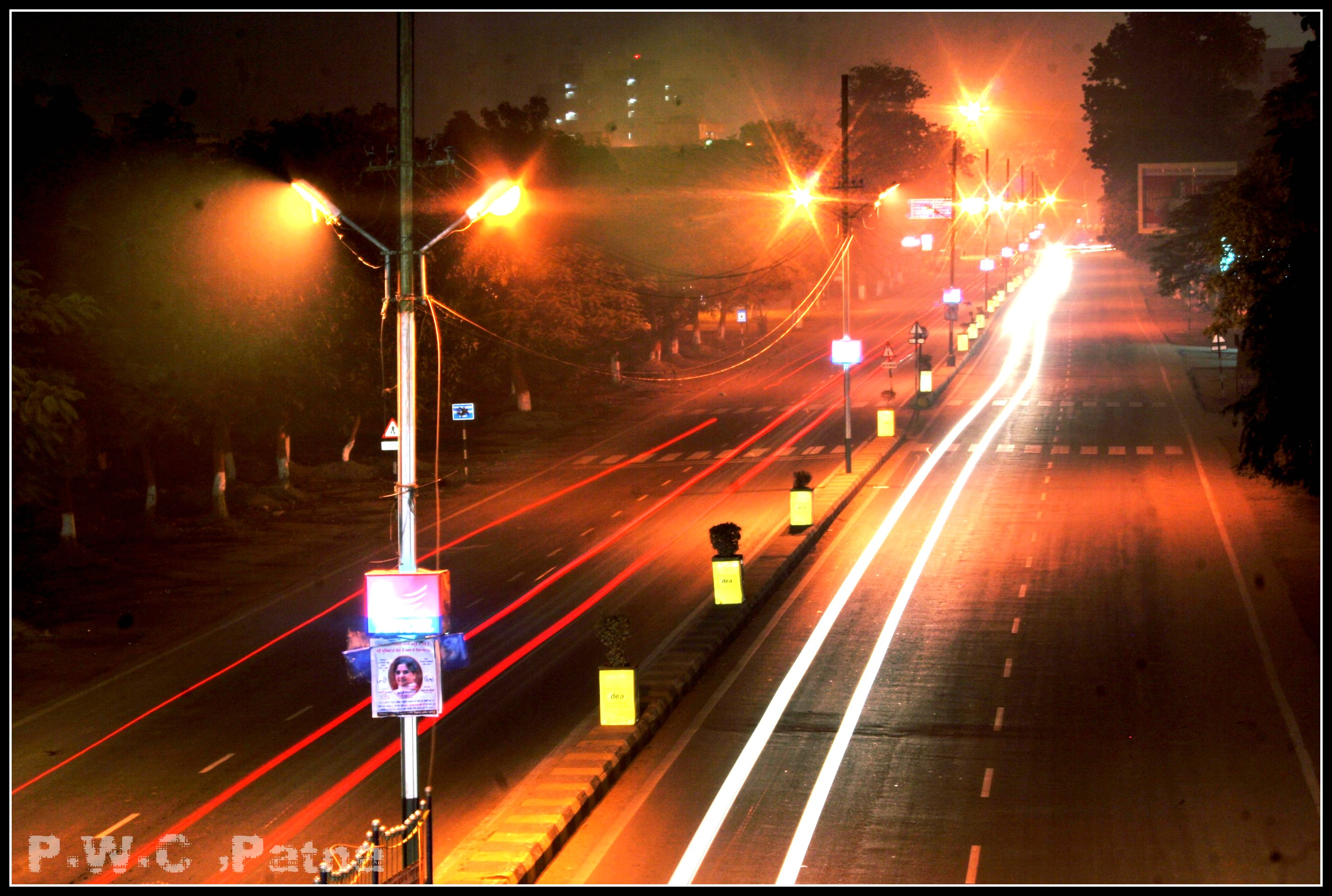
Nightscape of Bailey Road

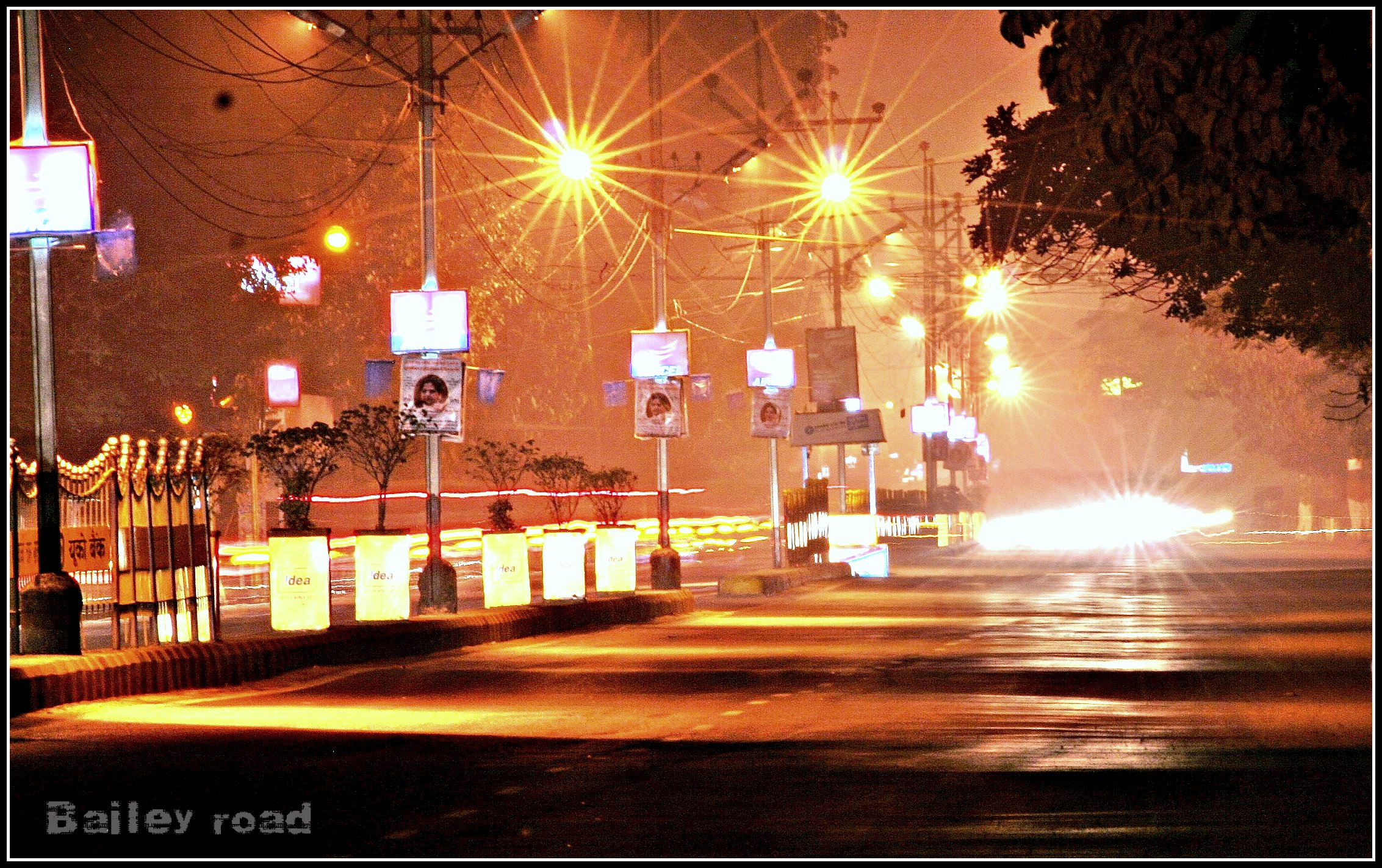
Fogscape

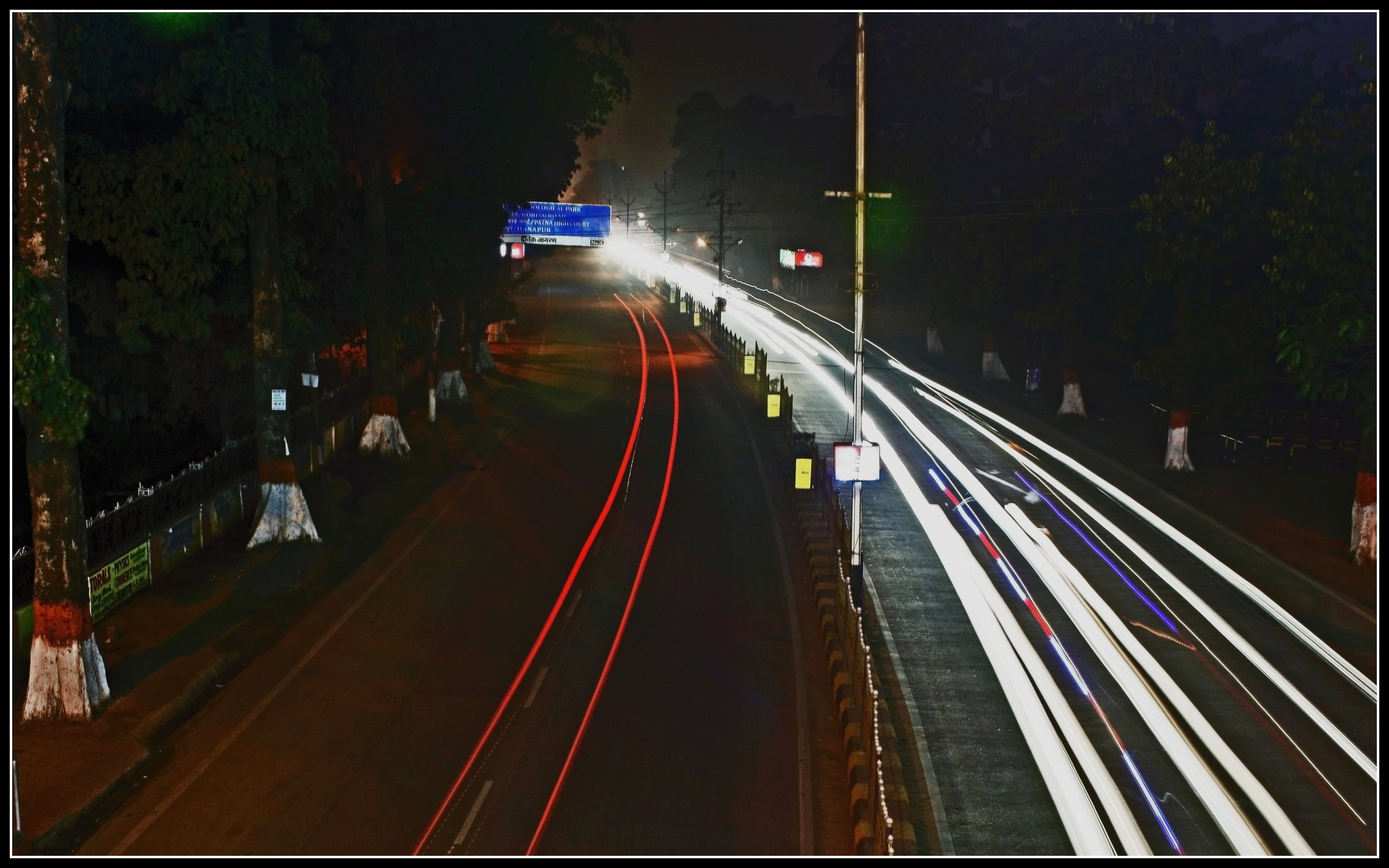
As viewed from Foot-over bridge near Patna Women's College

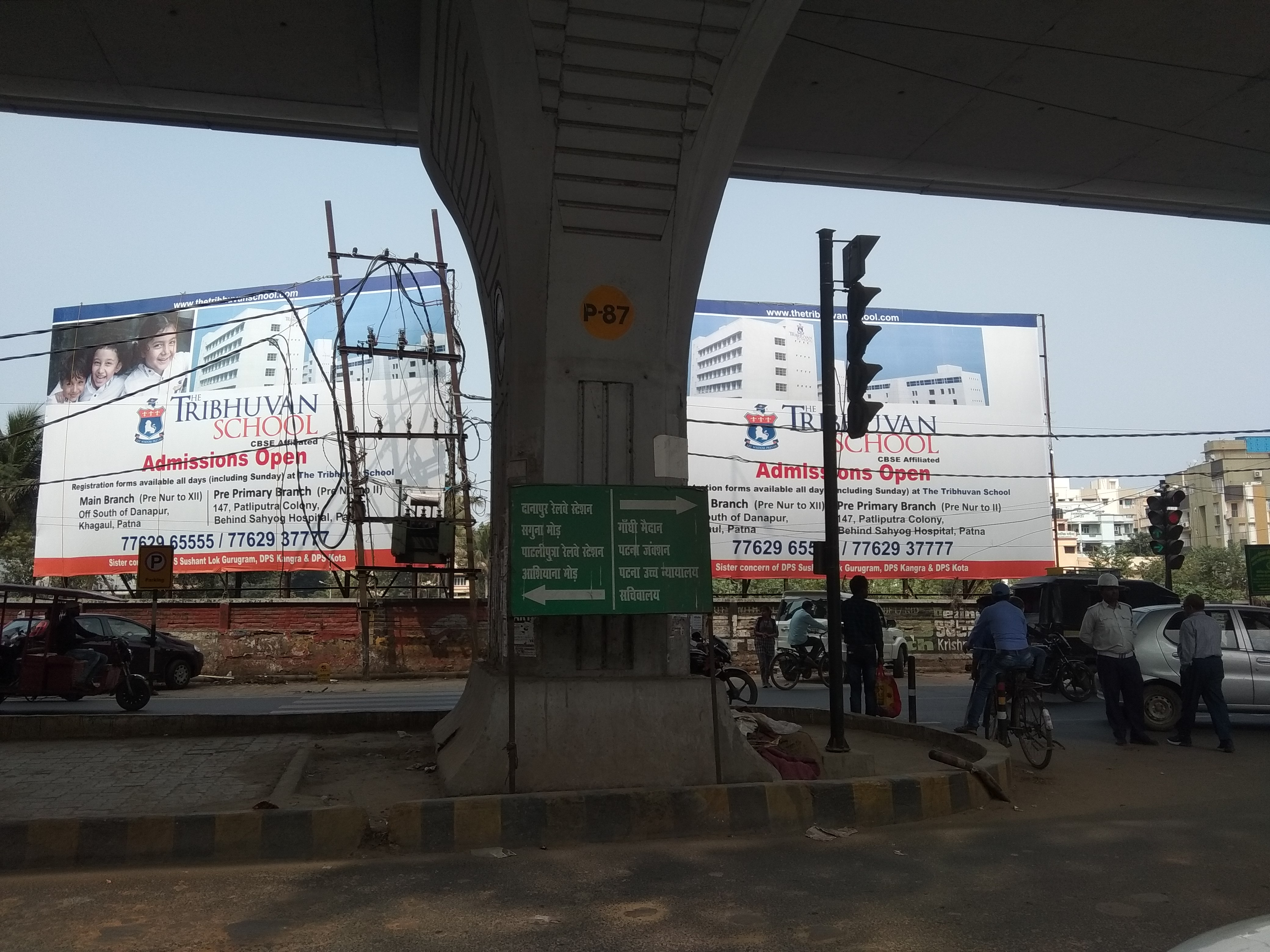
Bihar's longest flyover from Jagdeo Path Mor to Sheikhpura Mor in Bailey Road, Patna

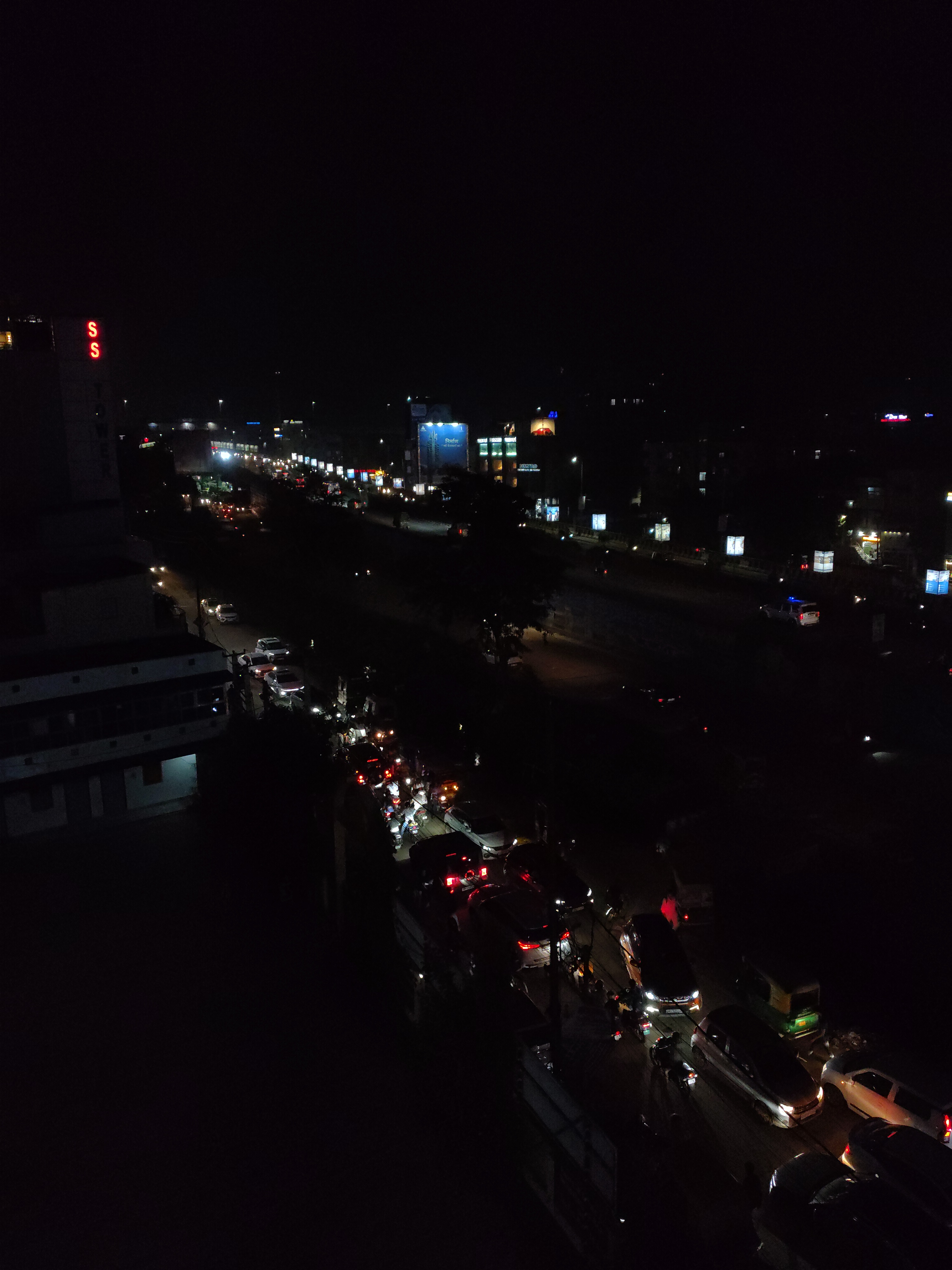
Nightscape with traffic, 2026

== See also ==
- Frazer Road
