= List of tourist attractions in Patna =

Tourism in Patna is refers to tourism in capital city of Bihar state in India. Patna is known for its tourist destinations and people across the state and abroad visits Patna. This article deals with major tourist attractions in Patna.

== History of tourism ==
The documented history of tourism in the Patna region dates back to the 4th century BC. Greek geographer Megasthenes (c. 350–290 BC) visited the region during the reign of Chandragupta Maurya. His observations were recorded in Indika. Dionysius was the son of Megasthenes, who visited Pataliputra in the reign of Ashoka the Great.

Fa-Hien (ca. 337 - c. 422) was a Chinese tourist who traveled to acquire Buddhist scriptures and take back to China between 399 and 412. Hieun-Tsang visited the sacred Buddhist sites in Magadha and spent much time studying at the great Nalanda University between 629 and 645.

== Types of tourists and tourism ==
In the earliest days tourism in the region was purely for educational purposes. 21st century tourism in Patna is mainly either religious-based or moderated educational tourism. The Bihar government is also promoting adventure tourism.

== Attractions ==
=== Archaeological sites ===
The history and tradition of Patna starts from the earliest dawn of civilization. The original name of Patna was Pataliputra. Its documented history starts around 600 BC.

- Kumhrar - The archaeological remains of the Mauryan period (322–185 BCE) have been discovered there, including the ruins of a hypostyle 80-pillared hall. The excavation dates back to 600 BC, and marks the ancient capital of Ajatashatru, Chandragupta and Ashoka, and collectively the relics range through four continuous periods from 600 BC to 600 AD.
- Didarganj Yakshi is a piece of Mauryan art in the Patna Museum,
- Agam Kuan, which means "unfathomable well", is said to date back to the period of the Maurya emperor Ashoka. The well is located east of Patna.

=== Ganges river banks ===
The Bihar State Tourism Development Corporation (BSTDC) has recently started operating an air-conditioned floating restaurant MV Ganga Vihar from Gandhi Ghat offering dinner cruises twice a day.

=== Religious complex ===
Patna is a popular destination for people who are on pilgrimage.

==== Hindu pilgrimages ====
- Mahavir Mandir, located in Patna, is one of the holiest Hindu temples dedicated to Hanuman. Millions of pilgrims visit the temple every year. It is the second most-visited religious shrine in North India. The Mahavir Mandir Trusts have the second highest budget in North India after the famous Vaishno Devi shrine.
- Patan Devi - The sacred temple is held to be one of the 51 Siddha Shakti Pithas in India. According to Puranic legends, the 'right thigh' of the corpse of Sati had fallen here when it was chopped off by Vishnu with his 'Sudarshan Chakra'. The ancient temple, originally called Maa Sarvanand Kari Patneshwari, is believed to be the abode of the Hindu goddess Durga.
- Birla Mandir

==== Sikh pilgrimages ====
Patna is one of the holiest cities in Sikhism, as the tenth Guru of the Sikhs, Guru Gobind Singh, was born here in 1666 and spent his early years before moving to Anandpur. Patna was also honoured by visits from Guru Nanak in 1509 as well as Guru Tegh Bahadur in 1666.

- Takht Shri Harmandir Saheb is one of the Five Takhts of Sikhism. The Gurdwara at Patna Sahib is in remembrance of the birthplace of Guru Gobind Singh, the tenth Guru of the Sikhs.
- Gurdwara Pahila Bara, commonly known as Gurdwara Ghai Ghat, is dedicated to Guru Nanak Dev, who during his visit to Patna stayed here in 1509 AD Guru Tegh Bahadur along with his family visited this place in 1666 AD
- Gurdwara Gobind Ghat is where the child Guru Gobind Singh used to play with his playmates on the bank of the Ganges. It is situated on the bank of river Ganges and hardly 200 yards from Takht Shri Harmandir Saheb. It is also known as Gurdwara Kangan Ghat.
- Gurdwara Guru ka Bagh - This Gurdwara is situated 2 miles away from the birthplace of Guru Gobind Singh.
- Gurdwara Bal Leela - This place is just a few meters away from Takhat Patna Sahib. Guru ji were playing with other children during his childhood. Gurdwara Bal Leela is also known as Maini Sangat.
- Gurdwara Handi Sahib - This Gurdwara was built in the memory of Guru Teg Bahadur, as he with Mata Gujri and Bala Preetam stayed here in 1728.

==== Islamic pilgrimages ====
- Pathar ki Masjid - The Pathar Ki Masjid stands on the bank of the river Ganges near Takht Shri Harmandir Saheb. Parvez Shah, son of Jahangir, established Pathar Ki Masjid in 1621.[1] The structure is built of stones, and so it got its name as Pathar Ki Masjid.
- Sher Shah Suri Masjid, a mosque, also known as Shershahi, is an example of the Afghan style of architecture. Sher Shah Suri built this mosque in 1540–1545 to commemorate his reign. It is sited in the southwest corner of Purab Darwaza near Dhawalpura.
- Maner Sharif is the place where Makhdum Daulat in 1608 died. It was then in 1616 that Ibrahim Khan, Governor of Bihar who was also his disciple, finished the construction of his mausoleum.
- Bihar Sharif - The city was an active centre of Muslim learning and art. Today it is a small town with a rich cultural past and is a major Muslim pilgrimage centre.
- Phulwari Sharif - Some important places in Phulwari Sharif: Khanqah Mujeebia, Sheesh Mahal, Shahi Sangi Masjid, Imarat-E-Shariya.

==== Christian pilgrimages ====
- Padari ki haveli - The "Mansion of Padre", also known as St Mary's Church, is the oldest church in Bihar. When Roman Catholics arrived in Bihar, they built a small church in 1713 at a place now known as "Padri-ki-Haveli".

==== Jain pilgrimages ====
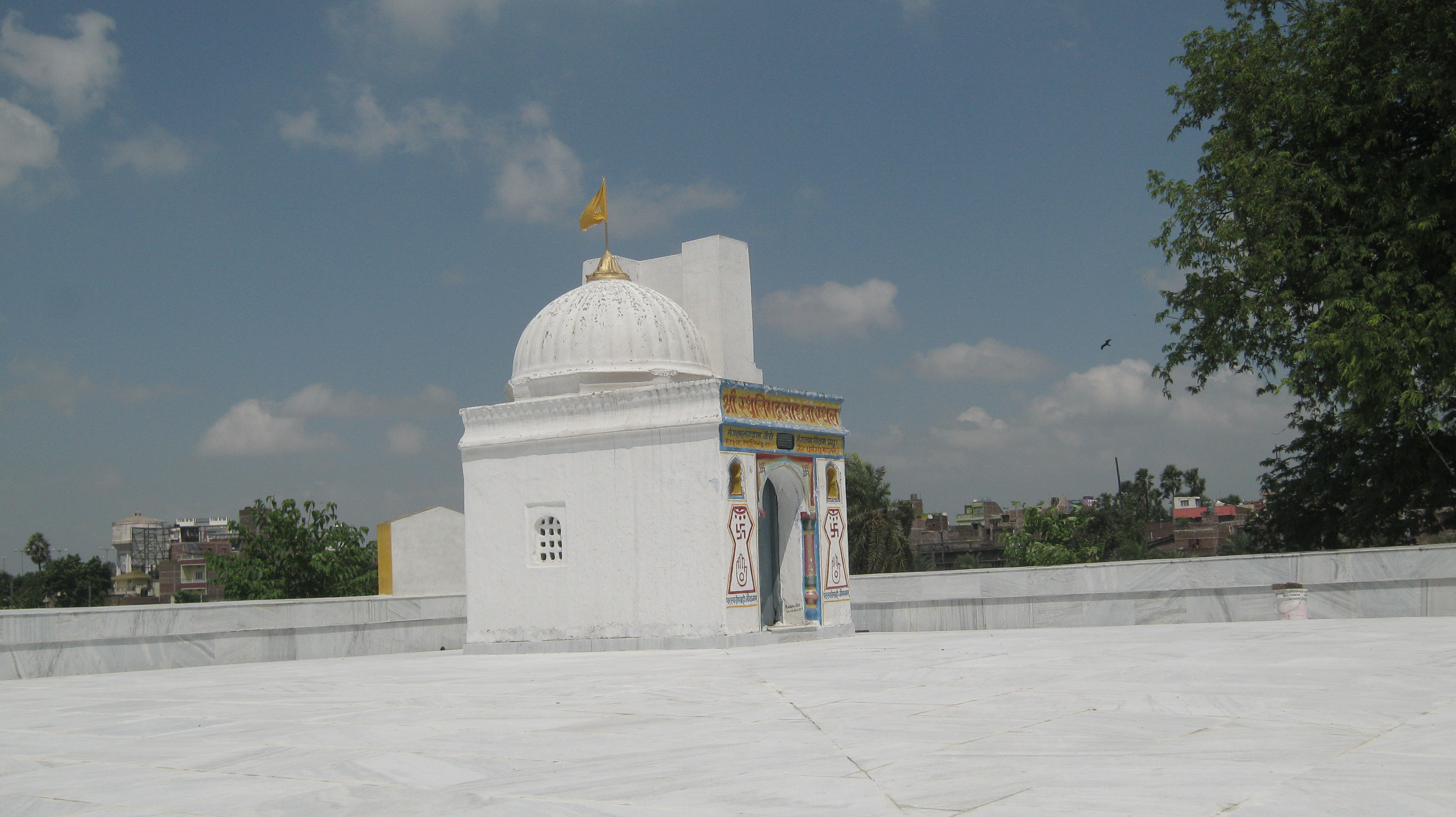
Kamaldah Jain Temple

- Kamaldah Jain Temple : Kamaldah Jain Temple Complex is the oldest Jain temple in Patna built in 18th century. This temple belonging to Śvetāmbara sect. of Jainism, is dedicated to Neminatha, the 22nd tirthankara. It is believed to be built on the site where Jain acharya Sthulabhadra (297—198 BCE) spent his last days. Sthulabhadra, a major preceptor of Śvētāmbara sect of Jainism, was the successor of Bhadrabahu The temple was built in 1729 CE (V.S. 1848) to commemorate the Sthulabhadra. The temple houses an inscription dating back to 1792 CE.

=== Infotainment complex ===
- Patna Planetarium is one of the largest planetariums in Asia. It was dedicated to the nation and opened to public on 1 April 1993.
- Patna Museum is the state museum of Bihar. It was built by the British during the British Raj in 1917 to house the historical artifacts found in the vicinity of Patna.
- Sanjay Gandhi Jaivik Udyan is classified as one of the 16 large zoos in the country and is also known as Sanjay Gandhi Botanical and Zoological Garden or the Patna Zoo. This is situated near Bailey Road in Patna.
- Srikrishna Science Centre - This institution forms a unit of the National Council of Science Museums, an autonomous body under the Ministry of Culture. It is located at the southwestern corner of the Gandhi Maidan. Of late it has become a popular destination, especially for the kids. A number of attractions have been added in the center.
- Khuda Bakhsh Oriental Library - One of the national libraries of India, it has a rare collection of Persian and Arabic manuscripts. It also hosts paintings made during Rajput and Mughal rule in India.
- Sinha Library

=== Buildings and structures ===
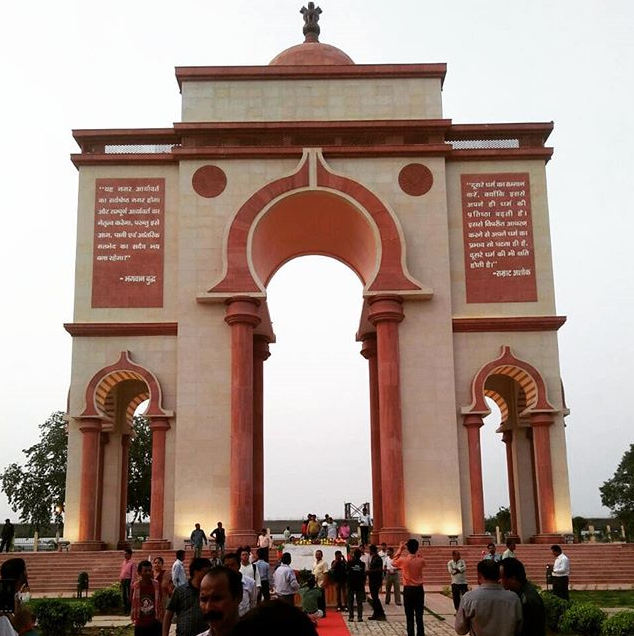
Sabhyata Dwar in Patna

- Golghar - The Golghar or Gol Ghar ("Round house"), located to the west of the Gandhi Maidan, is a granary built by Captain John Garstin in 1786.
- Sabhyata Dwar- a sandstone arch monument located on the banks on River Ganga in the city of Patna.
- Mahatma Gandhi Setu, with a length of 5,450 meters, is one of the longest bridges in the world. The approach to the bridge from the south is a 50 km long flyover. There are 40 piers to this bridge.
- Digha–Sonpur Bridge is a rail-cum-road bridge provides easy roadway and railway link between northern and southern parts of Bihar.
- Kargil Chowk is a war memorial. It was established in the year 2000, near Gandhi Maidan. It is dedicated to the soldiers from Bihar and Jharkhand who sacrificed their lives in the Kargil War against Pakistan in 1999.
- Patna High Court was established on 3 February 1916, and later affiliated under the Government of India Act 1915 (5 & 6 Geo. 5. c. 61). The court is headquartered in Patna, the administrative capital of the state.
- Naghol kothi is a palace (Kothi) located in Patna. This building was built during the British Raj by a Mughal architect and is a splendid example of Mughal architecture. This building is surrounded by a beautiful garden.
- Saheed Smarak is a landmark situated near Bihar Vidhan Sabha. It is a memorial to seven extraordinary students who attempted to hoist the Indian flag on top of the Bihar Vidhan Sabha in 1942 during British rule.
- Darbhanga House, also called Nav Lakha building, was built by Maharaja Sir Kameshwar Singh of Darbhanga. This beautiful building on the banks of Ganges houses the Kali Mandir, which is a place of worship of the goddess Durga.
- Shri Krishna Memorial Hall
- Secretariat Building

=== Parks ===
- Gandhi Maidan, previously known as the Patna Lawns, is a historic ground at Patna near the banks of the Ganges.
- Patna Zoo is classified as one of the 16 large zoos in the country and is also known as Sanjay Gandhi Botanical and Zoological Garden or Patna Zoo. It is situated near Bailey Road in Patna.
- Buddha Smriti Park, located at the place where once historical Bankipore jail of British era existed. The central attraction of this park is the Stupa, 200 feet high, situated in the middle of the park.

=== Sports complexes ===
- Moin-ul-Haq Stadium is the largest in Bihar. The stadium features a swimming pool and a cricket academy.
- Patna Golf Club - situated west of the Government House to the South Bihar Gymkhana Club. It is a 165-acre (67 ha) golf field and includes some very tough holes. This well-maintained course will prove interesting to amateur and pros alike.

=== Club ===
Patna houses such prominent clubs as the Bankipore Club, Golf Club, New Patna Club, Lions Club, and Rotary Club. The Bankipore Club, on the banks of the river Ganges, came into existence in 1913. It is affiliated with various organizations. The dance hall of this club is said to be one of the original buildings built by the Dutch in the 17th century.

=== Neighbourhoods ===
- Bankipore
- Kankarbagh
- Maner Sharif
- Bihta
- Danapur
- Khagaul
- Masaurhi

=== Places Near Patna ===
- Hajipur
- Vaishali
- Rajgir
- Nalanda
- Gaya
- Bodh Gaya
- Pawapuri
- Sonepur

== Sources ==
- Dalal, Roshen (2010) [2006]. The Religions of India: A Concise Guide to Nine Major Faiths. Penguin books. ISBN 978-0-14-341517-6.
- Singh, Pradyuman (2018). Bihar General Knowledge Digest. New Delhi: Prabhat Prakashan. ISBN 978-93-52667-69-7.
- Sinha, Nishi (1999). Tourism Perspective in Bihar. New Delhi: APH Publishing. ISBN 978-81-70249-75-7.
- Wood, Michael (2015). The Story of India. Michael Wood: The Story of India. BBC Books. ISBN 9781448141463.
