= MV Ganga Vihar =

Indian hotel

MV Ganga Vihar popularly known as Floating Restaurant or MV Kautilya is a Restaurant which helds in Gandhi Ghat, Patna, the capital city of Bihar. It was started by Bihar State Tourism Development Corporation in 2009 but it was stopped in 2017 due to some Technical Faults. It was restarted in December 2022.

M/S Sandhya Samrat Construction & Services Pvt Limited, Patna is the Company which took tender of MV Ganga Vihar.

== Informations ==
MV Ganga Vihar is a 48-seater Air Conditioned Restaurant which floats on Ganga River. It starts from Gandhi Ghat.
