= Bihar State Information Commission =

Statutory body in Bihar, India

- बिहार राज्य सूचना आयोग
- Established: 2006
- Jurisdiction: Bihar
- Location: Soochna Bhawan, Bailey Road, Patna, Bihar
- Authorised by: Right to Information Act, 2005
- Judge term length: 3 years from the date of entering office or up to 65 years of age (whichever is earlier)
- Website: http://www.bihar.com/RTIComplain.aspx

State Chief Information Commissioner
- Currently: Vinay Kumar

State Information Commissioners
- Currently: Brajesh Mehrotra; Prakash Kumar

The Bihar State Information Commission is a statutory body which was established by the Government of Bihar in accordance with Section 15 of the Right to Information Act, 2005 in June 2006. Main objective of the commission is to fulfill the mandate assigned in the Right to Information Act, 2005. State of Bihar framed its sets of rules with prescribed formats and fees, etc. in June 2006.

The State Information Commission's mandate is to exercise the powers conferred on, and to perform the functions assigned to, under the Act.

The State Information Commission consist of

- The State Chief Information Commissioner.
- The State Information Commissioners.

== History and functions ==
The Central Information Commission (CIC) was set up by Government of India under the Right to Information Act in 2005. All the states were instructed to set up their own state commissions at state level. Government of Bihar created the body as per this direction in 2006. The State Information Commission of Bihar is the representation of Central Information Commission at state level.

The commission has certain powers and functions mentioned in sections 18, 19, 20 and 25 of the RTI Act, 2005 which broadly relate to adjudication in second appeal for giving information. The body also gives direction for record keeping, imposition of penalties, suo motu disclosures receiving and inquiring into a complaint on inability to file RTI.

== Powers and duties of officers and employees ==
Chief State Information Commissioner

Over all management of the State Information Commission matters including general supervision, direction and leadership. Scrutiny of appeals and complaints under Sec 19 and 18 respectively and issue of ruling where hearing has been held on appeals or complaints. Co-ordination with the different State Information Commissions as well as with different departments of the State Government with respect to RTI act of 2005.

Secretary

To assist the Chief State Information Commissioner in various works and as directed by the Chief State Information Commissioner. To act as controlling officer for officers and staff in the State Information Commission office, Mumbai. To co-ordinate with various Government departments for matters related to the State Information Commission and the Right to Information Act, 2005.

Section officers

Scrutiny and putting up cases follow up on decisions and instructions with respect to Right to Information Act. Scrutiny of other allotted subject with reference to office administration, financial matters etc. which may allotted from time to time.
