= Gandhi Ghat, Patna =

Place in Patna, Bihar

Gandhi Ghat
- गांधी घाट (Hindi)
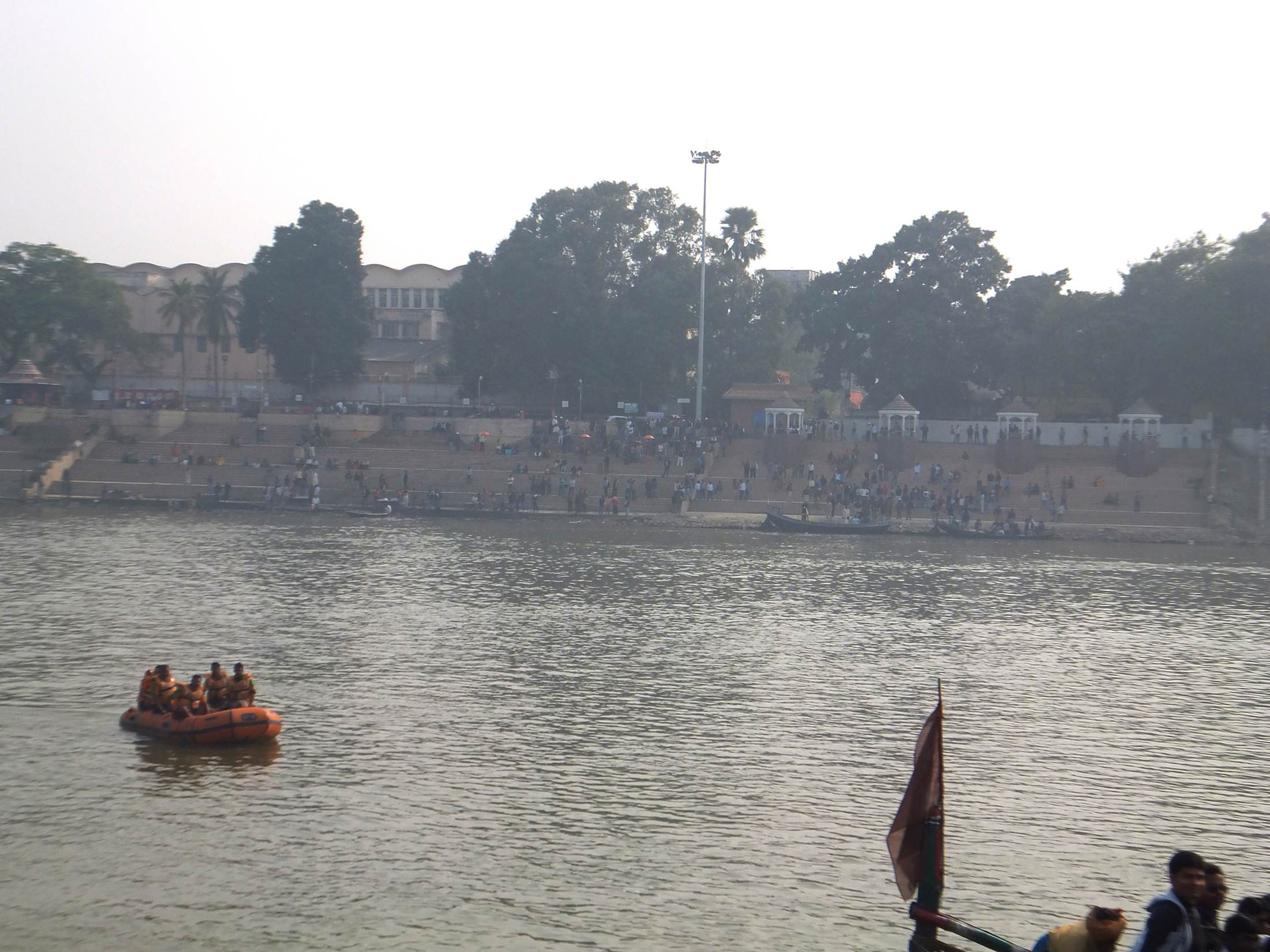
- View of Gandhi Ghat from river Ganges
- Interactive map of Gandhi Ghat
- 25°37′18″N 85°10′20″E
- Location: Patna

Site notes
- Governing body: Patna Municipal Corporation

Gandhi Ghat (Hindi: गांधी घाट) is one of the main ghats on the Ganges River in Patna. It is named after the Indian independence movement leader Mahatma Gandhi. The ghat is famous for its Evening Ganga Aarti. It is also associated with the immersion of ashes of Mahatma Gandhi in the Ganges.

== Location ==
Gandhi Ghat is situated on the bank of the Ganges. It is located behind National Institute of Technology, Patna and is around 5 kilometers north-east of Patna Junction railway station.

== Ganga Aarti ==
Ganga Aarti on Gandhi Ghat is performed with 51 lamps, by priests dressed in saffron robes. The Aarti starts with the blowing of a conch shell and continues with the movement of incense sticks in elaborate patterns and circling of large burning lamps that create a bright hue against the darkened sky. The ritual was started in 2011 on the lines of Ganga Aarti in Varanasi and Haridwar.

== Tourism ==
Bihar State Tourism Development Corporation (BSTDC) operates MV Ganga Vihar from Gandhi Ghat. Ganga Vihar is a River Cruise ship with restaurant on-board also known as the floating restaurant. It runs Sunset Cruise and Leisure Cruise/Corporate Cruise with boarding for tourists from the ghat. Another vessel MV Kautilya was added in 2016 which is a cruise boat for tourist rides on river Ganges from Gandhi Ghat. The Tourism Department also plans to keep a floating jetty that would be placed at Gandhi Ghat, from where the two vessels operate.

=== Kite Festival ===
BSTDC organises a kite festival on the Sabbalpur diara island, across the river on the occasion of Makar Sankranti. Festival first started in 2011 and has been organised every year since then.

== See also ==
- Ghats in Bhagalpur
- Tourism in Patna
