= Bihar Administrative Service =

Indian state civil service

Bihar Administrative Service (BAS)
Service Overview
- Founded: 1 April 1949
- State: Bihar
- Staff College: Bihar Institute of Public Administration and Rural Development, Patna, Bihar
- Cadre Controlling Authority: General Administration Department, Government of Bihar
- Minister Responsible: Samrat Chaudhary, Chief Minister of Bihar and Minister of General Administration Department
- Legal Personality: Governmental: Civil Service
- Current Cadre Strength: 1634 members
- Selection: Bihar Public Service Commission (BPSC) - Combined Competitive Examination (CCE)
- Association: Bihar Administrative Service Association (BASA)

Head of the State Civil Services
- Chief Secretary: Pratyaya Amrit, IAS
- Principal Secretary (GAD): B Rajendra, IAS

Bihar Administrative Service, often abbreviated to as BAS, is the administrative civil service of the Government of Bihar comprising Group A and Group B posts. It is also the feeder service for Indian Administrative Service in the state.

BAS officers hold various posts at sub-divisional, district, divisional and state level including conducting revenue administration and maintaining law and order. The General Administrative Department of the Government of Bihar is the cadre-controlling authority of the service. Along with the Bihar Police Service (BPS) and the Bihar Forest Service (BFS), the BAS is one of the three feeder services to its respective All India Services.

== Recruitment ==
Entire recruitment to the service is made on the basis of an annual competitive examination conducted by Bihar Public Service Commission called BAS officers. There is no provision for entry into BAS through promotion from Circle Officers of Bihar Revenue Service (BRS) unlike in most states where Tehsildar and equivalent revenue officers are promoted into their state administrative service. BAS officers are appointed by the Governor of Bihar.

== Salary structure ==
The salary structure of the Bihar Administrative Service
Grade/level on pay matrix	Base Salary (per month)	Sanctioned Strength	Some Positions in the Government of Bihar Government	Years of service
Special secretary grade (pay level 14)	₹131100–218200	24	Special secretary to state government, Mission director to state directorates	25th year
Additional secretary grade (pay level 13A)	₹123100–216800	48	Additional secretary to state government, Municipal commissioner, Settlement officer	21st year
Joint secretary grade (pay level 13)	₹118500–214100	192	Joint secretary to state government, Additional municipal commissioner, Regional development officer, Secretary to Divisional commissioner	17th year
Additional collector grade (pay level 12)	₹78800–209200	304	Deputy development commissioner, Additional collector, Additional district magistrate, Regional transport officer	13th year
Deputy secretary grade (pay level 11)	₹67700–208700	339	Deputy secretary to state government, city magistrate, District land acquisition officer, District transport officer, District supply officer	5th year
Entry grade (pay level 9)	₹53100–167800	727	Sub divisional magistrate, Additional sub Divisional Magistrate, Land reforms deputy collector, Sub divisional grievance redressal officer	Initial year
