= Delhi Public School, Patna =

Public co-educational school in Bihar, India

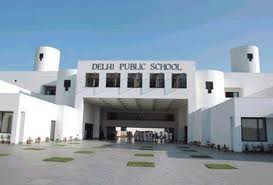
- DPS, Patna (senior wing) in Danapur

Location
- Chandmari, Danapur; Patna, Bihar; 25°37′45″N 85°01′01″E

Information
- Type: Public, co-educational
- Motto: "Service before self"
- Established: 1998
- Principal: Mr. B. Vinod
- Classes: Nursery–XII
- Colours: White and green
- Affiliation: CBSE
- Website: dpspatna.com

Delhi Public School, Patna or DPS Patna is a school in Patna, Bihar, India. It was established in the year 1998 in collaboration with DPS Society and the Takshila Education Society. DPS, Patna is affiliated with the Central Board of Secondary Education, New Delhi. The motto of the school is "Service Before Self." DPS Patna features in the top 10 CBSE Schools of Patna.

== Location ==
The school has 2 campuses in the city, the junior wing in Priyadarshi Nagar, Bailey Road, Patna, and the senior wing in Chandmari Village, Danapur Cantonment. The path to the school (Senior Wing) was recently closed due to protests from local farmers. It is selectively open for school Buses only.

== Cultural events organised by School ==
The school hosts many cultural events under another organization called "Spic Macay". These include the National School Intensive in December 2010, and "Ninad" in October 2011. The School also conducted seminars with well-known experts under the name "Beyond Boundaries" during the time of COVID-19 lockdown. It has been uploaded on YouTube.

== Important events at school ==
=== Interschool events ===
- Slam Dunk (Basketball Championship)
- Kick Off (Football Championship)
- Master Stroke (Chess Championship)
- Takshila Music and Dance Competition
- Top Spin (Table Tennis Championship)
- Takshila Hockey Championship
- Robofest (A championship in which children from different schools come and create robots)
- Take Off (Athletics Championship)
- CBSE Cluster

=== Intraschool Events ===
- Annual Athletic Meet ( For class IV-XII ) (Annual Sports Tournament)
- Get Set Go ( For class Nursery-X) (Annual Sports Tournament)
- Annual Activities ( For class Nursery-III )
- Bal Sangham ( For class Nursery-V ) (Takes place on the occasion of Children's Day)
- Khoj – An event for students of class V, in which they spend one night at school with their friends and teachers.
- Rural Immersion Programme – An event for students of class XI. The students are taken to Bhatkan, Siwan, Bihar where the school has a living accommodation. The students spend one week with their friends and teachers there.

The school conducted "Open Mic" contest which was based on oratory skills. Children from DPS Ludhiana, DPS Coimbatore, DPS Pune participated along with students of DPS Patna.

== Games and sports ==
Delhi Public School has many provisions for sports and games. It has a half Olympic-size swimming pool, a badminton arena, a lawn tennis court, a football pitch, a hockey ground, a table tennis room, and a basketball court. The School Has various sports clubs such as Football, Basketball etc. Although the school has so many arrangements for almost all kinds of sports, it lacks resources for one of the most evergreen sports which is cricket.

== Notable alumni ==
- Ishan Kishan-Indian cricketer
