= Bihar State Tourism Development Corporation =

Tourism Development in Bihar

Bihar State Tourism Development Corporation Limited
- बिहार राज्य पर्यटन विकास निगम

Agency overview
- Formed: 1980
- Jurisdiction: Bihar
- Headquarters: Beer Chand Patel Path, Patna -800001; 25°36′5″N 85°7′33″E
- Minister responsible: Nitish Mishra, Minister Tourism
- Agency executive: KANWAL TANUJ, IAS, (Managing Director)
- Parent department: Tourism Department, Government of Bihar
- Website: bstdc.bihar.gov.in

Bihar State Tourism Development Corporation (Hindi: बिहार राज्य पर्यटन विकास निगम), (abbreviated as BSTDC), is a body of the Government of Bihar responsible for the development of tourism in the Indian state of Bihar. It was established in 1980 to develop tourism in the state. The BSTDC is head-quartered at Patna and has offices across all the districts of Bihar. The agency also operates hotels, resorts, and tourist rest houses in key locations in the state. The corporation provides travellers with information about Bihar to promote travel to and in the country. It operates Tourist Information Centres as well as a website. The BSTDC disseminates information about transportation, lodging, food and beverage, and sight-seeing.

== Tourist Information Centres ==
BSTDC have several tourist reception centres in all major cities and tourist centres, from where conducted tours start and end, in addition to providing complementary information about tourist destinations, maps and guides.

Tourist Information Centres (Inside Bihar) Last Update 10-8-2021

- Tourist Information Centre, Patna Junction, Patna
- Tourist Information Centre, Jay Prakash Narayan Airport, Patna
- Tourist Information Centre, Rajendra Nagar Railway Station, Patna
- Tourist Information Centre, Patna Sahib Railway Station, Patna
- Tourist Information Centre, Patna Sahib (Gurudwara), Patna
- Tourist Information Centre, Railway Station, Gaya
- Tourist Information Centre, Tourist Complex, Bodhgaya
- Tourist Information Centre, Hotel Gargee Gautam Premises, Rajgir
- Tourist Information Centre, Vaishali
- Tourist Information Centre, Hotel Lichwi, Railway Station, Muzafferpur
- Tourist Information Centre, Combinded Building, Bhagalpur
- Tourist Information Centre, Hotel Karn Vihar, Munger

Tourist Information Centres (Outside Bihar) Last Update 10-8-2021

- Tourist Information Centre, Flat No 108-110, First Floor, Narayan Manzil, 23 Barhkamba Road, New Delhi-110001
- Tourist Information Centre, Nilkanth Bhawan, 26B, Camac Street, Kolkata-700016
- Tourist Information Centre, Jawaharlal Nehru Market, Englishia Lane, Varanasi-221001
- Tourist Information Centre, Ground Floor, MTNL Bhawan, Bandra Kurla Complex, Kurla(west) Mumbai- 400098 [Operated By Bihar Foundation]

== See also ==
- Tourism in Bihar
- Tourism in Patna
- Tourism in India
