= Eco Park, Patna =

Park in Patna, India

Coordinates: 25°21′19″N 85°38′53″E

Rajdhani Vatika
- Eco Park
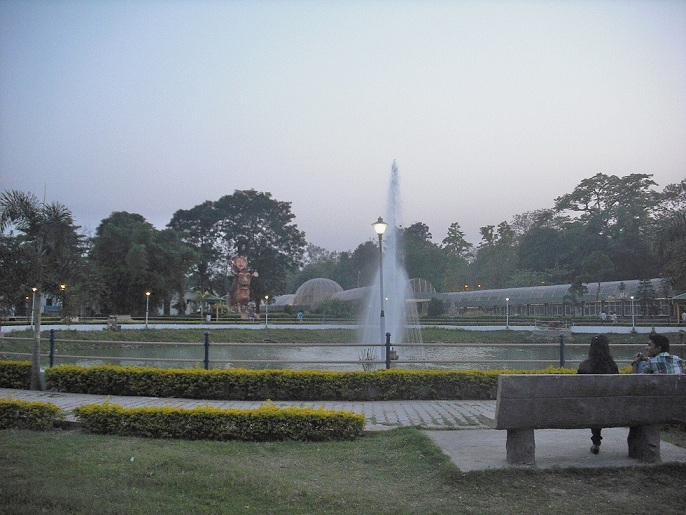
- Interactive map of Rajdhani Vatika
- Type: Urban park
- Location: Patna, India
- Status: Open all year

Rajdhani Vatika, better known as Ecological Park or Eco Park, is a park located on Strand Road in Patna, Bihar. This park was inaugurated in October 2011 by Nitish Kumar, the Chief Minister of Bihar, following an initiative of the Department of Environment and Forest, Bihar. The area has 1,445 metres of pathway, a children's corner and 1,191 metre jogging track. It has been developed to ease the load of Patna Zoo. The park is spread over 9.18 hectares of land, including two lakes.

Around 90,000 to 100,000 people visit every month. The average daily visitor numbers are between 3,000 and 5,000 on normal days. Sundays and special days attract larger numbers (6,000 to 9,000). The park received a maximum number of tourists on 1 January 2014 with 42,350 visitors.

== Overview ==
The park is full of green areas with more than 3,000 varieties of plants and has two large sections. The first section has a children corner, food court, and several fountains. The second part has theme parks like Rashi Van, Guru Vatika, Panchwati and Kewli Van. Additionally, the park hosts sculptures like the Cactus by Subodh Gupta among others.

In the second section of Eco Park, there exists a restaurant and a lake with boat rides including gym in this ecological park for visitors. Both the sections in Eco Park are interconnected through a tunnel.

== See also ==
- Buddha Smriti Park
- Hardinge Park
