= Bihar Public Service Commission =

State government agency

- Abbreviation: B.P.S.C.
- Formation: 1 April 1949; 77 years ago
- Type: Government agency
- Headquarters: Patna, Bihar
- Region served: Bihar
- Chairman: Shri Parmar Ravi Manubhai, IAS
- Members: Shri Imteyaz Ahmad Karimi, BAS Dr. Ashok Kumar Sharma, BAS Prof. Deepti Kumari Dr. Arun Kumar Bhagat, BAS Shri Shobhendra Kumar Choudhary, BAS
- Staff: 1600
- Website: bpsc.bihar.gov.in

The Bihar Public Service Commission (BPSC) is a government body in the state of Bihar, India, established by the Constitution of India, to recruit candidates for various state government jobs in Bihar through competitive examinations.

== History ==
The history of the Constitution of India reveals that the concept of conducting competitive examination for appointment to certain posts came into consideration way back in the year 1853 and a committee for giving shape to that was constituted under the chairmanship of Lord Macaulay in 1854. Later on the Federal Public Service Commission and the State Public Service Commissions were constituted under the Government of India Act 1935. The Bihar Public Service Commission came into existence from 1 April 1949 after its separation from the Commission for the States of Orissa and Madhya Pradesh, in accordance with subsection (1) of section 261 of the Government of India Act 1935, as adapted. Its constitutional status was pronounced with the promulgation of Constitution of India on 26 January 1950. It is a Constitutional body under Article 315 of the Constitution of India. The Bihar Public Service Commission initially began its functioning for the State of Bihar with its headquarters at Ranchi. The State Government decided to shift the headquarters of the Commission from Ranchi to Patna and it was finally shifted to Patna on 1 March 1951. The first Chairman of the Bihar Public Service Commission was Shri Rajandhari Sinha. Shri Radha Krishna Choudhary was the first Secretary to the Commission. The Bihar Public Service Commission (Conditions of Service) Regulations, 1960 was framed by the State of Bihar in the exercise of the powers conferred by Article 318 of the Constitution of India and in supersession of the Regulation published with the Appointment Department's notification no. A-2654 dated 31 March 1953. Under Rule 3 of the Regulations, 1960 the Commission was constituted with a Chairman and 10 (ten) other members. The strength of members was reduced to 6 (six) after bifurcation of the State of Bihar and the State of Jharkhand vide notification no. 7/PSC-1013/95 (Part-3) Per 8262 dated 9 October 2002 of the Personnel & Administrative Reforms Department, Bihar.

== The Mandate ==
Article 320 and 321 of the Constitution of India prescribes the mandate of the State Public Service Commissions, which are:
a)Recruitment by the conduct of Competitive Examinations/ through interviews to the services of the State Government.
b)Advising the State Government on the suitability of officers on appointment on promotion as well as transfer from one service to the other.
c)Advising the State Government on the matters related with recruitment to various services and posts, framing and amendment of Recruitment Rules.
d)Advising the State Government in all disciplinary cases relating to different services.
e)Advising the State Government in the matter of grant of extraordinary pension, reimbursement of legal expenses, etc.
f)Advising the State Government on any matter referred to the Commission by the Governor of Bihar.

== Recruitment ==
Recruitment is made by two methods

1. Direct Recruitment:-Direct recruitment is made mainly by way of conducting the competitive examination in which the selection is done on the basis of either of the following procedures.

Procedure 1

a) Preliminary examination
b) Main (Written) Examination of the candidates successful in Preliminary Test.
c) Interview.

Procedure 2

- Main (written) and interview

Procedure 3

- Interview only

2. Promotion:-Promotion is granted to employees through the Departmental Promotion Committee (under the chairmanship of the Commission) constituted for the same and in accordance with the rules framed by the State Government.

== Annual Report ==
Article 323 of the Constitution of India prescribes for the submission of annual report of the work done by the State Public Service Commission to the Governor of the State. The Bihar Public Service Commission accordingly submits annual report of the work done by the Commission to the Governor of Bihar.

== BPSC paper leak ==
BPSC On 8 May 2022 cancelled the examination for its 67th civil services (preliminary). Before the Exam started exam paper was shared through various media platforms. over six lakh candidates applied for the first stage examination conducted on May 8. It was meant to shortlist aspirants for 802 posts in Bihar's civil services. Those who qualified for the preliminary examination would have been eligible to appear for the second round of tests held to recruit middle-rung officials. Jharkhand connection of the paper leak case of BPSC TRE-3 Exam has come to light. In this case, 5 people have been taken into custody from Hazaribagh.

== Recent Crackdown on Coaching Institutes ==
In August 2025, the Bihar Public Service Commission (BPSC) issued an official advisory addressing fraudulent claims made by certain coaching centers and unauthorized instructors across social media platforms. These establishments allegedly promoted their practice materials as being directly aligned with actual BPSC examination questions.

The BPSC dismissed these assertions as completely false and commercially motivated. The Commission revealed that similar false claims were made regarding earlier examinations, which were thoroughly investigated and proven to be baseless. These misleading statements were also challenged and rejected during legal proceedings in the High Court.

Clarifying its standard examination methodology, the BPSC explained that all question papers follow a prescribed process. Questions are randomly selected from an official question bank to create multiple sets, making any correlation with coaching material impossible. Given this randomized selection process, the Commission emphasized that no coaching institute's study material can match the topics, language, structure, answer choices, or solutions of actual exam questions. Similarities, if any, would be purely accidental.

The BPSC has advised all aspirants to exercise caution against such misleading claims and avoid getting distracted by speculation about exam content. The Commission encouraged candidates to maintain focus on sincere and dedicated preparation for their examinations.

== See also ==
- Union Public Service Commission
- List of Public service commissions in India
