= Patna Zoo =

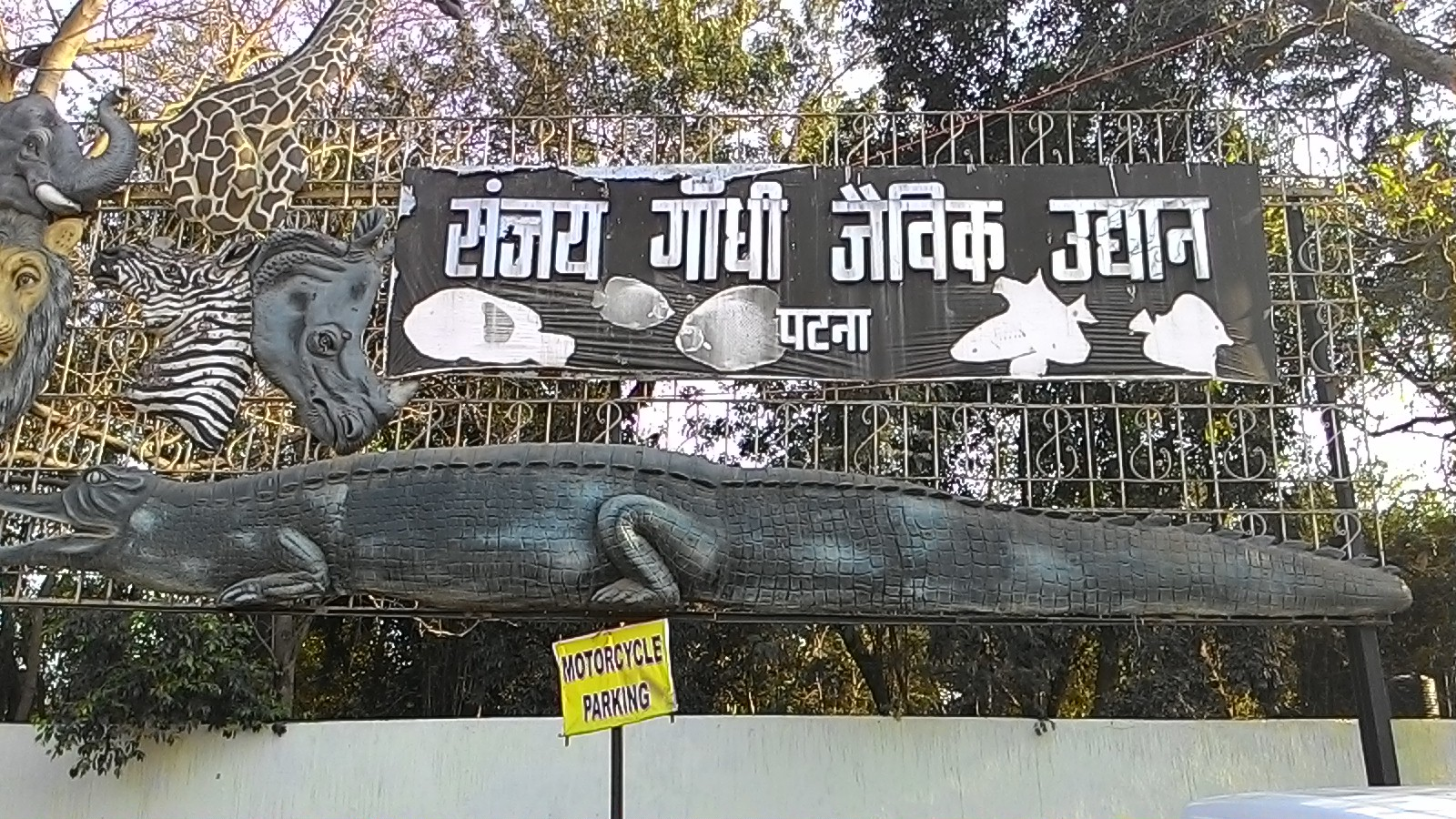
- Patna Zoo
- Interactive map of Patna Zoo
- 25.596513°N 85.099304°E
- Date opened: 1973
- Location: Patna, Bihar, India
- Land area: 152.95 acres (61.90 ha)
- No. of animals: 800
- No. of species: Trees: 300 species Animals: 70 species Fish: 35 species Snakes: 5 species
- Annual visitors: 45-55 lakh
- Memberships: CZA
- Website: patnazoo.bihar.gov.in

Patna Zoo is located off Bailey Road in Patna, Bihar, India. The park was opened to the public as a zoo in 1973. The park is Patna's most frequented picnic spot, with more than 36,000 visitors on New Year's Day alone in 2022.

== History ==
The park was first established as a botanical garden in 1969. The then Governor of Bihar, Sri Nityanand Kanungo, provided almost 34 acres (14 ha) of land from the Governor House campus for the garden. In 1972, Public Works added 58.2 acres (23.6 ha) to this, and the Revenue Department transferred 60.75 acres (24.58 ha) to the Forest Department to help expand the park.

Since 1973, this park has been a biological park, combining a botanical garden with a zoo. The land acquired from the Public Works Department and the Revenue Department was declared protected forest by the state government on 8 March 1983.

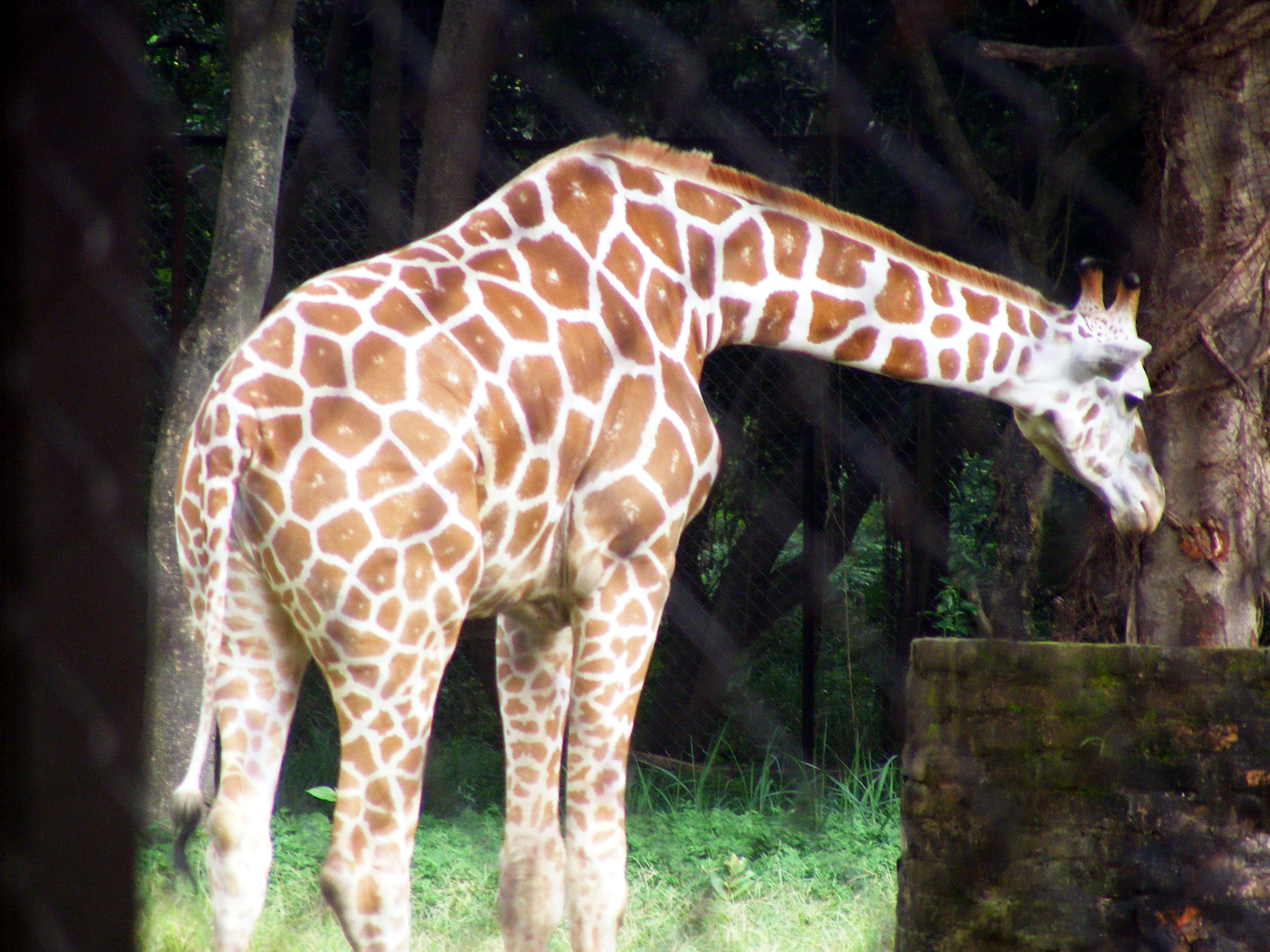
A giraffe at Patna Zoo

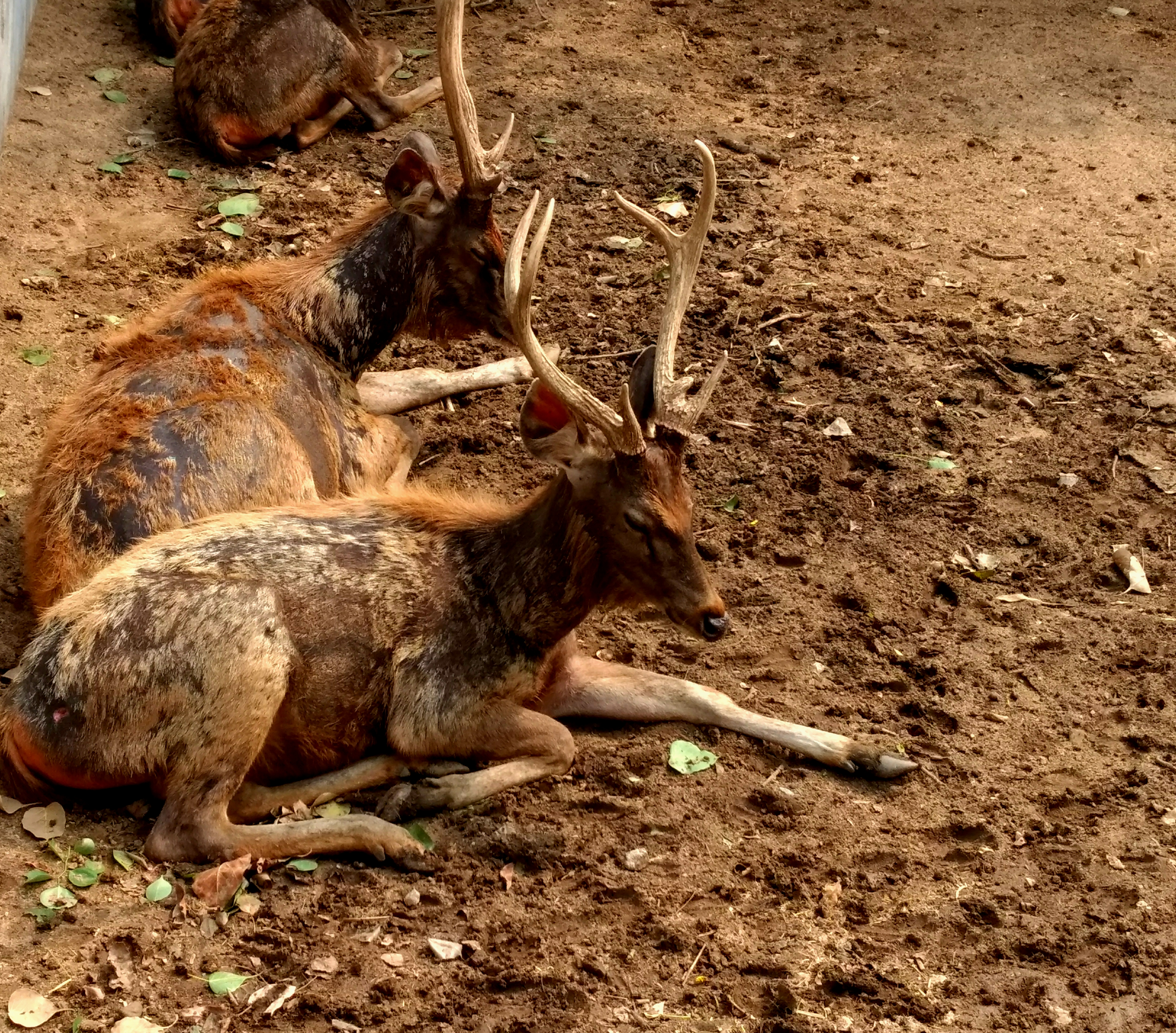
A resting antelope at Patna Zoo

In 1981, the Government of Bihar renamed the institution as the Sanjay Gandhi Biological Park in memory of Sanjay Gandhi, who had died the previous year. Despite the official name, the facility continued to be widely known locally as Patna Zoo. In April 2026, the Bihar Cabinet approved the restoration of the official name Patna Zoo, and the managing society of the park was renamed accordingly.

== Animals and exhibits ==
The zoo is currently home to over 800 animals of about 110 species, including tiger, leopard, clouded leopard, hippopotamus, crocodile, elephants, Himalayan black bear, jackal, black bucks, spotted deer, peafowl, hill myna, gharial, python, Indian rhinoceros, chimpanzee, giraffe, zebra, emu, and white peacock.

Having started as a botanical garden, the park currently houses more than 300 species of trees, herbs and shrubs. Plant exhibits include a nursery for medicinal plants, an orchid house, a fern house, a glass house, and a rose garden.

The park also includes an aquarium which is the largest revenue generator after the general admission fee. The aquarium has about 35 species of fish, and the snake house has 32 snakes belonging to 5 species.

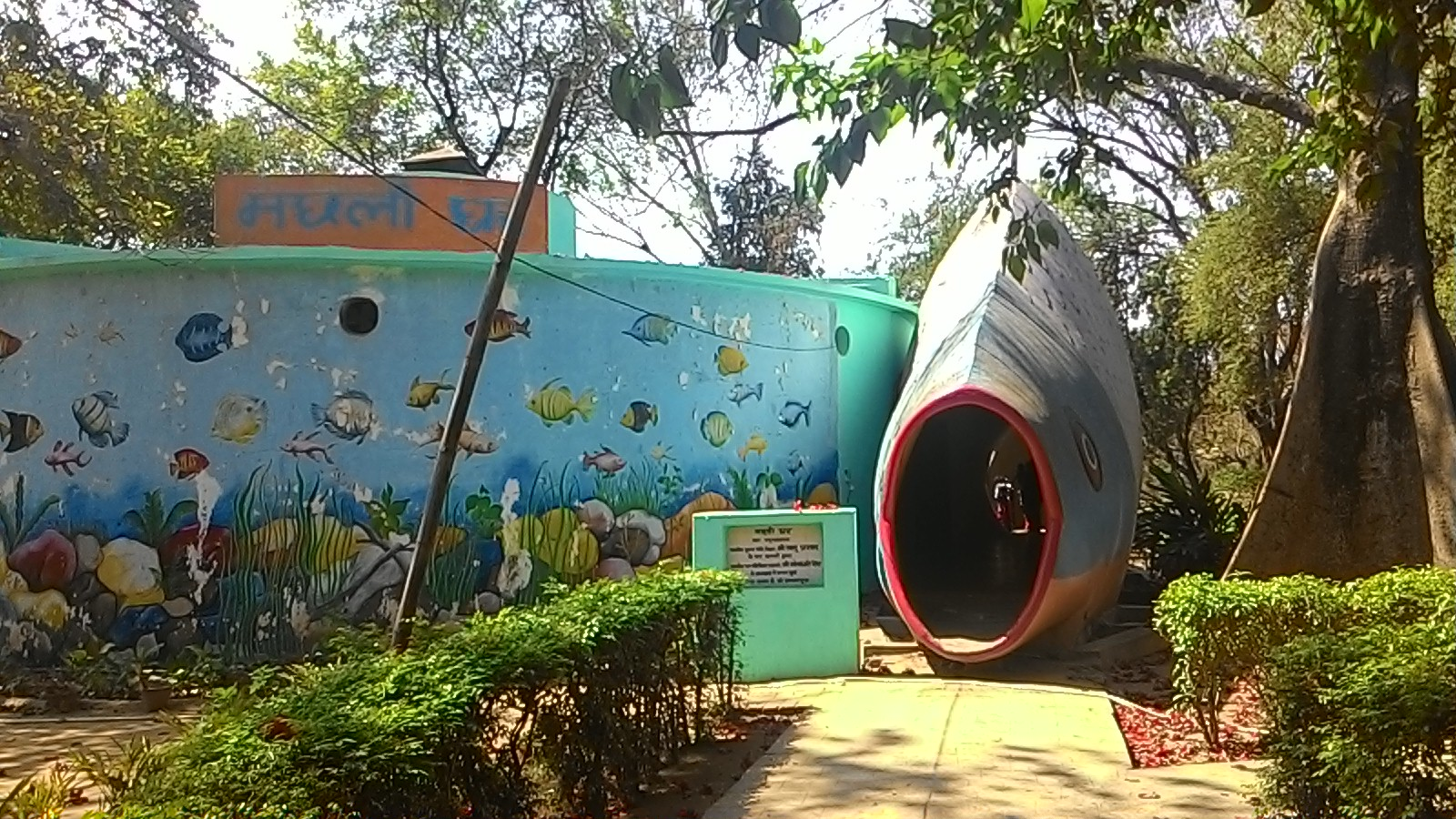
Aquarium at Patna Zoo

== Conservation and births ==
The Patna Zoo makes considerable effort to conserve and propagate endangered species from around the world. Breeding captive wild animals is a difficult challenge that the zoo has met with some notable success.

=== Success ===
- The great one-horned rhinoceros has been bred successfully several times in the past. In 2008, Patna Zoo earned acclaim for its breeding techniques.
- A hippopotamus has given birth for the first time at the zoo to a male hippo on 19 April 2001. There have been several other hippo births since, including in 2007.
- A leopardess named Reena at zoo gave birth to two cubs on 18 June 2001, marking the zoo's first successful leopard breeding in 16 years. She gave birth again to two cubs on 4 March 2002, within nine months.
- An alligator has bred for the first time in the zoo on 29 June 2001 and after that several time in past. The number of gharials or alligators here have gone up from 13 to 129 in the last five years.
- A porcupine bred for the first time in the zoo on 12 June 2001 and gave birth to two baby porcupines.
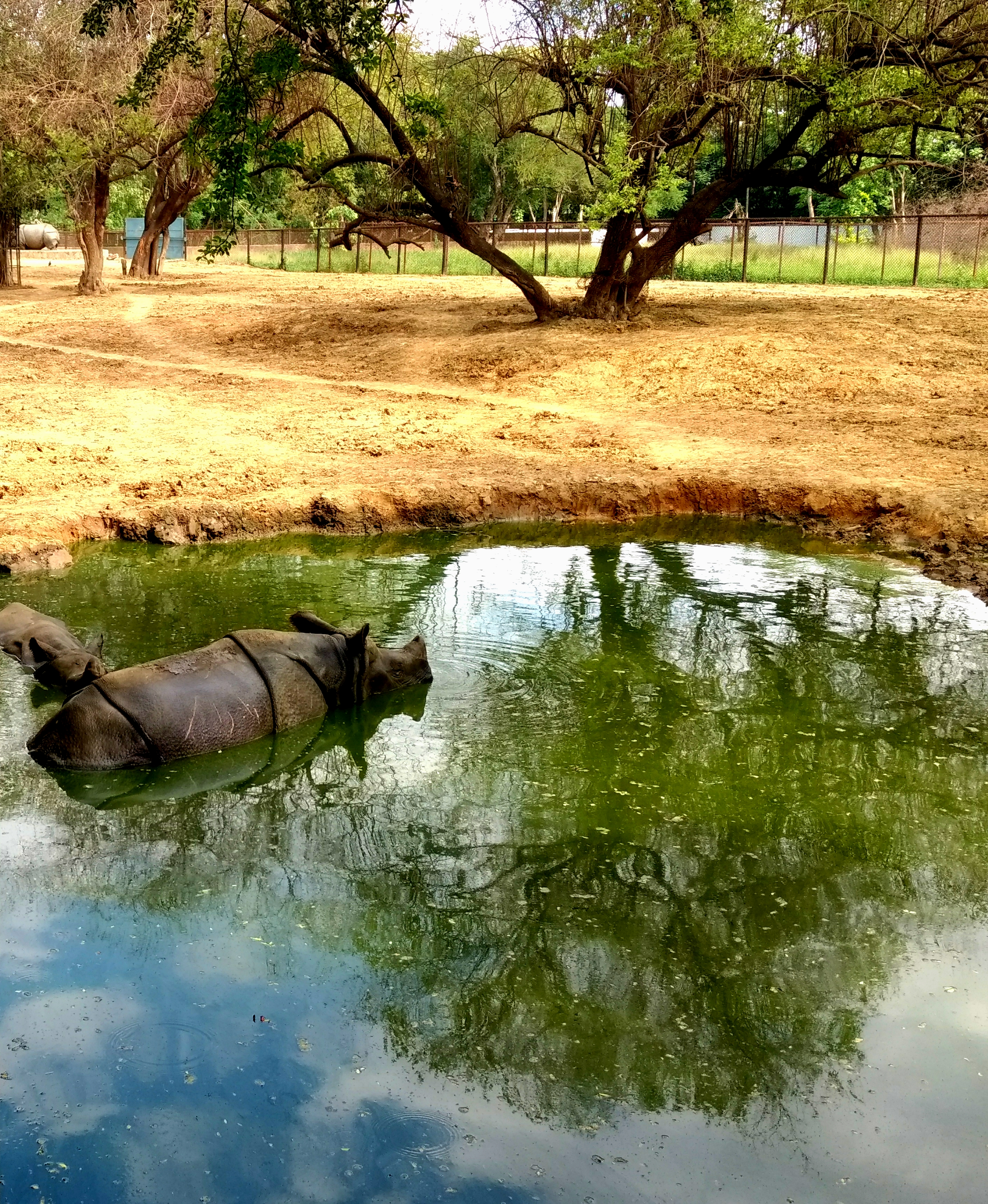
  One-horned rhino in water puddle during summer at Patna Zoo

=== Initiative ===
- The zoo received a white tiger in the first week of March from Nandankanan Zoo, Bhubaneshwar. This has improved the chances of breeding the tiger in the zoo.
- There is a single male zebra in the zoo. It is expected that a female zebra will arrive in the zoo if the Central Zoo Authority approves the proposal.

=== Birds ===
This place provides a good sighting for birders.

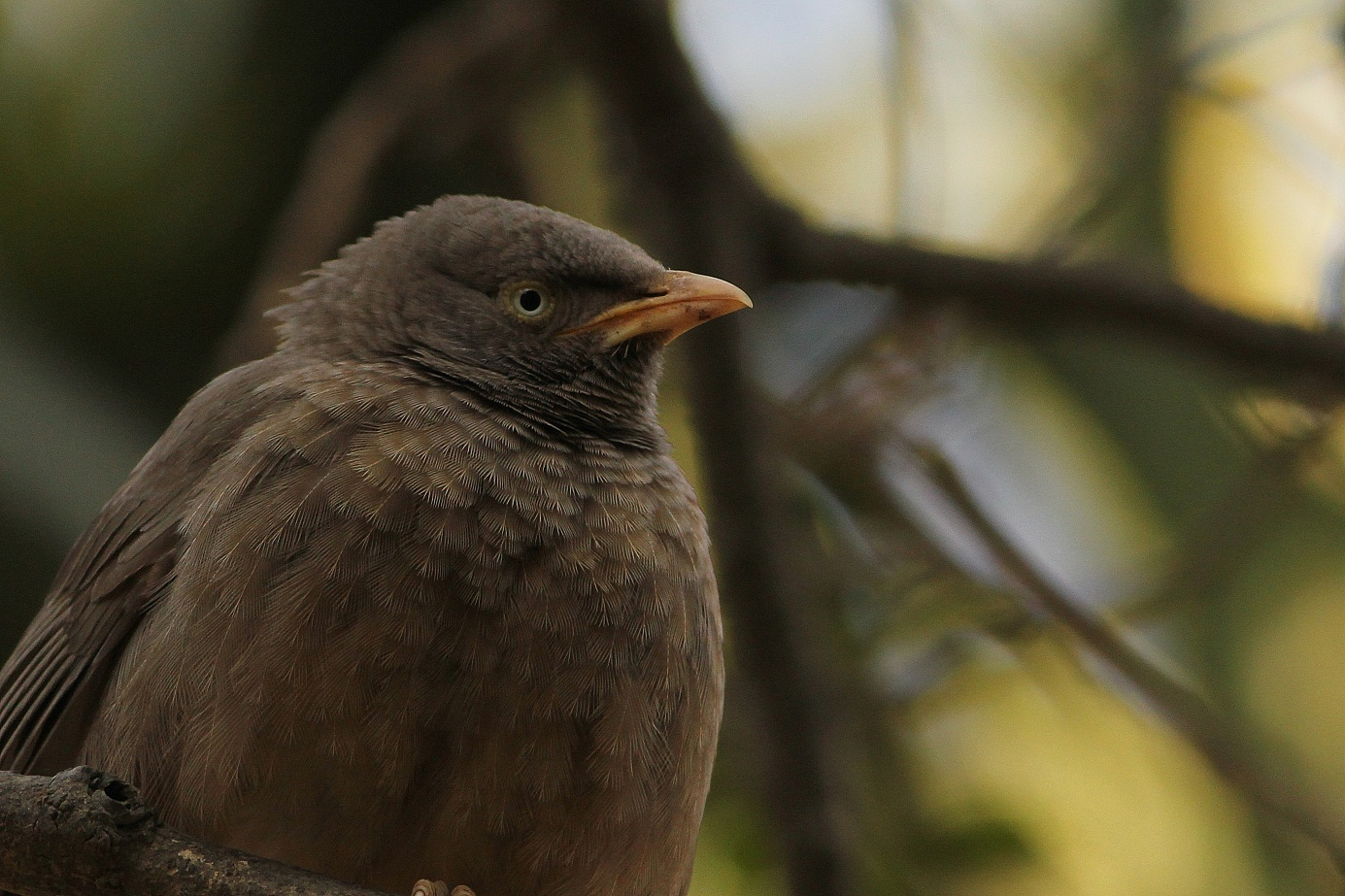
Jungle Babbler

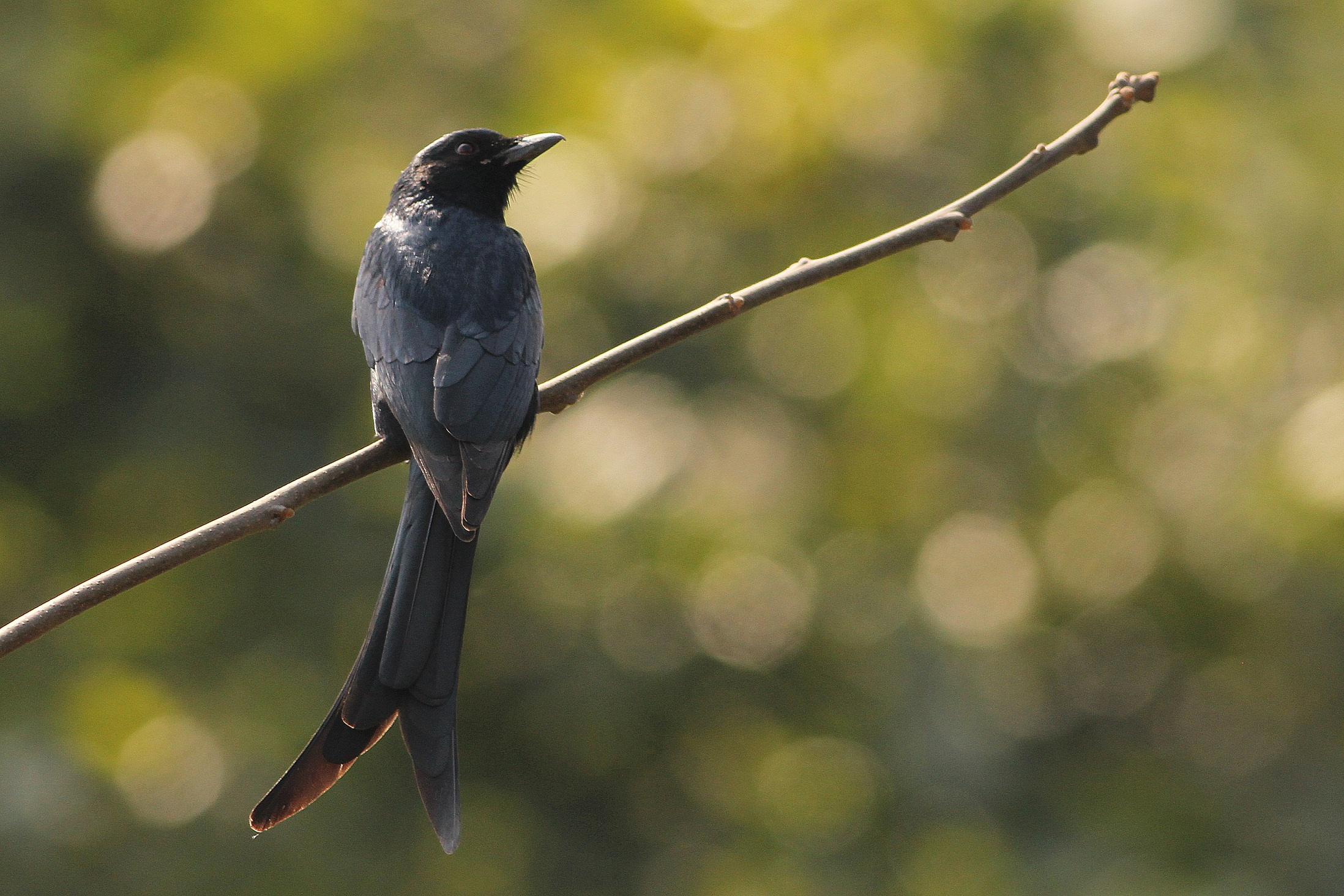
Black drongo

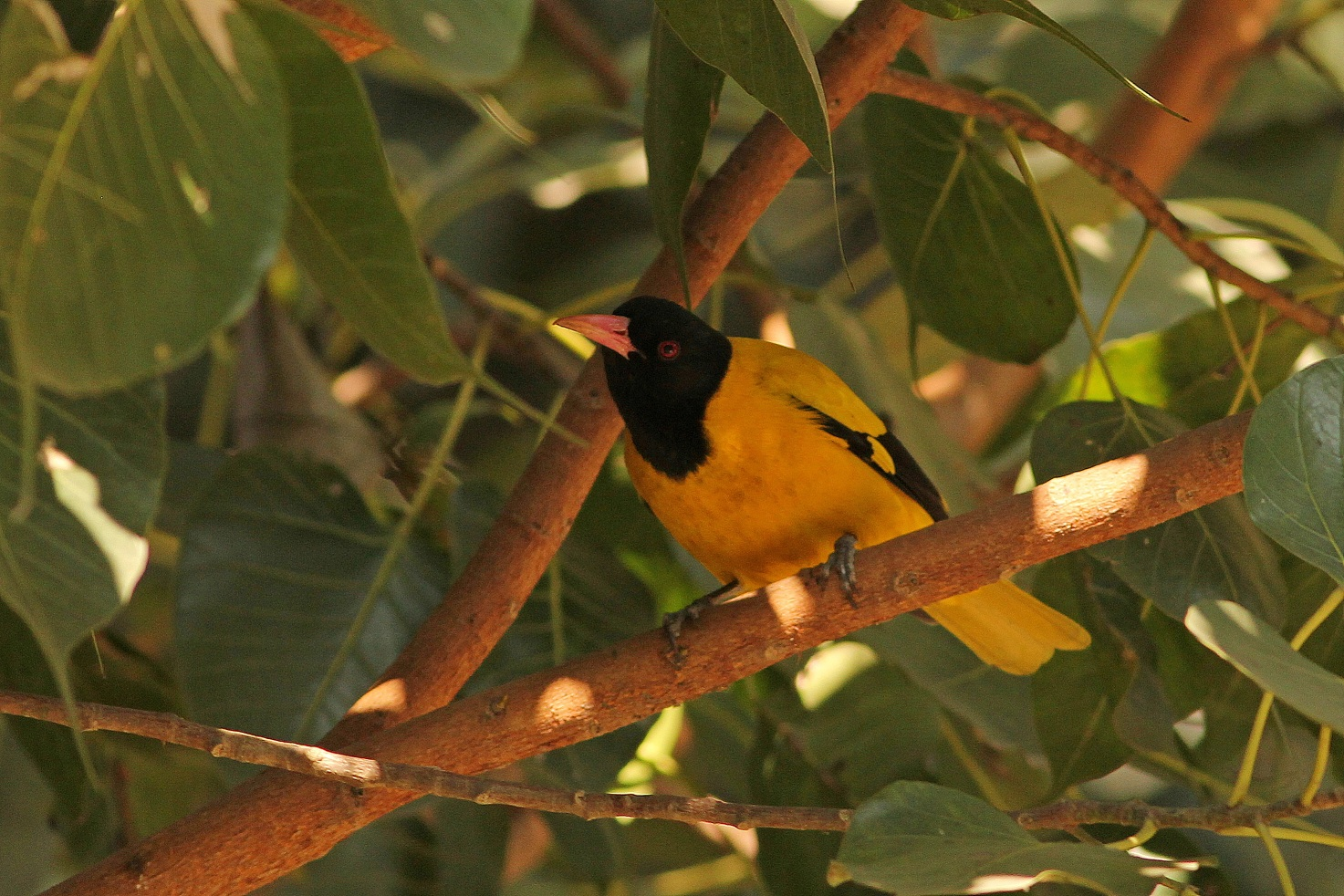
Black hooded oriole

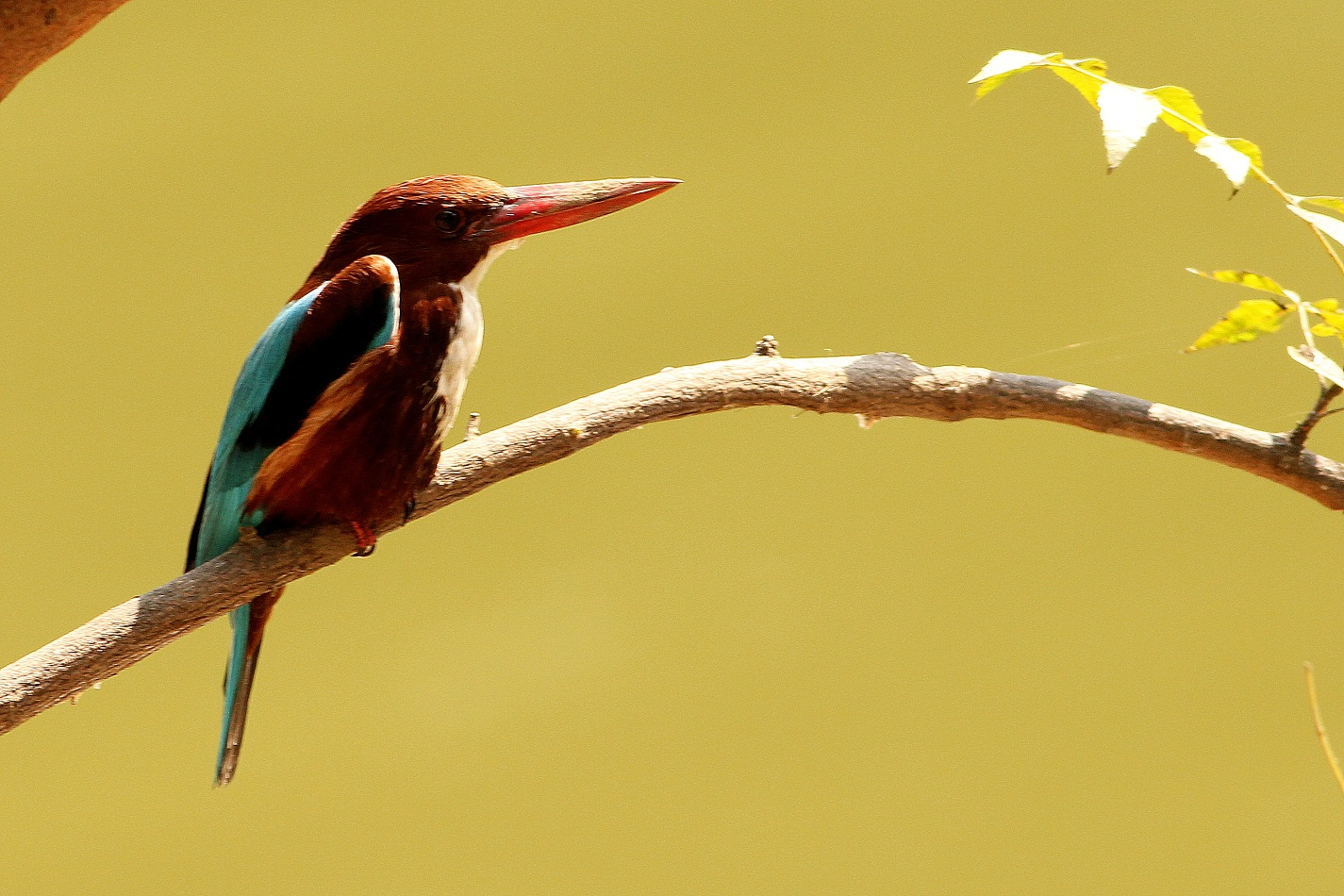
White throated kingfisher

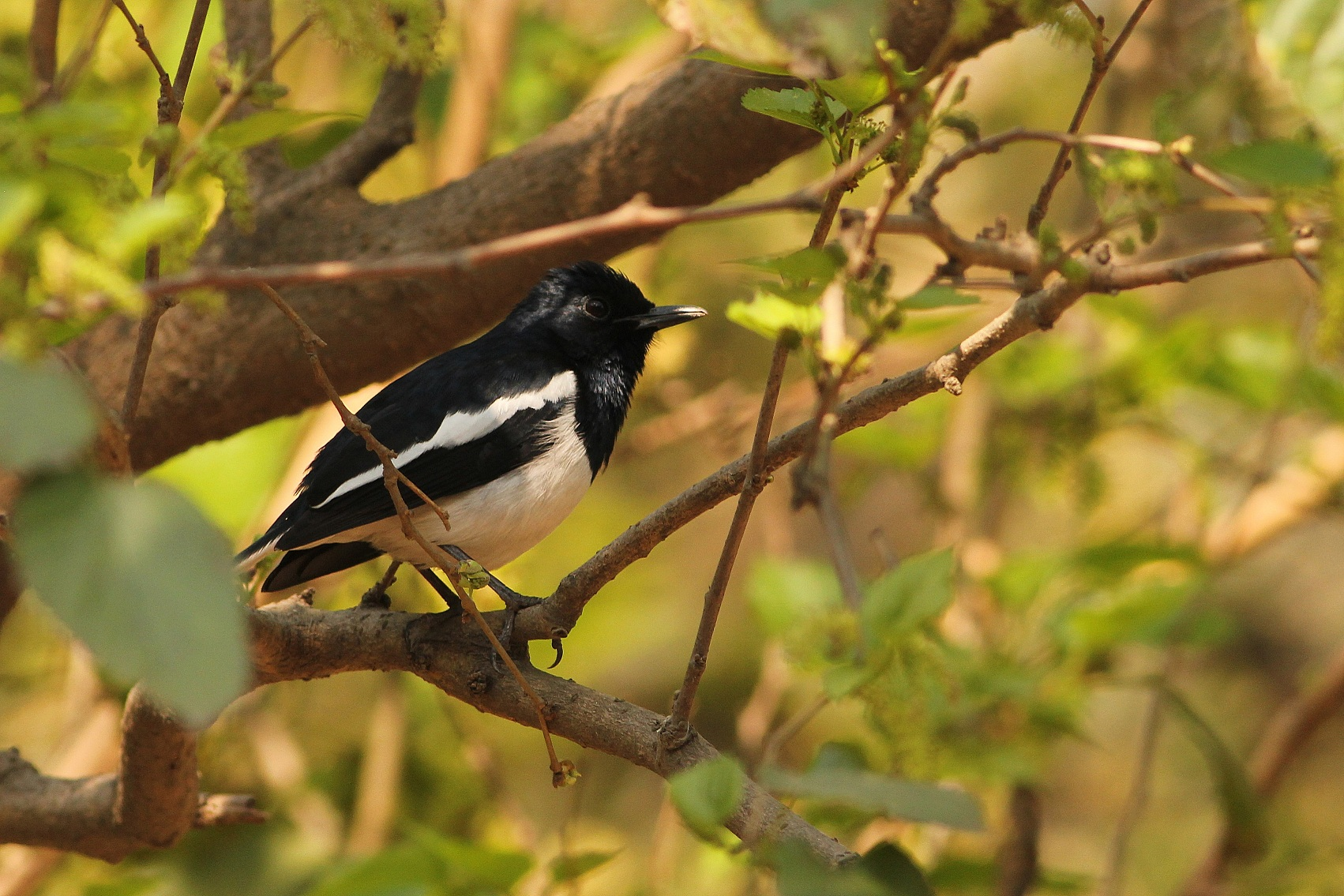
Oriental magpie robin

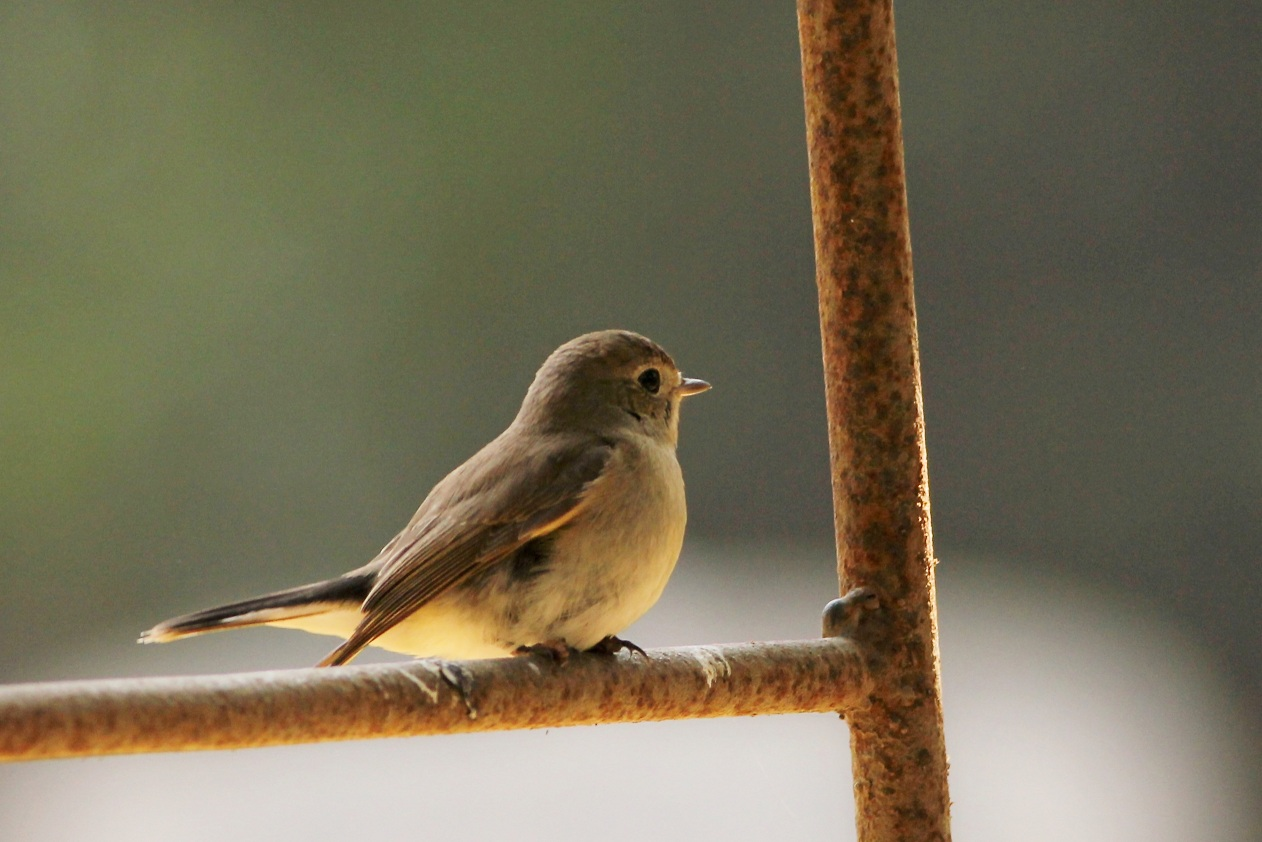
Taiga flycatcher

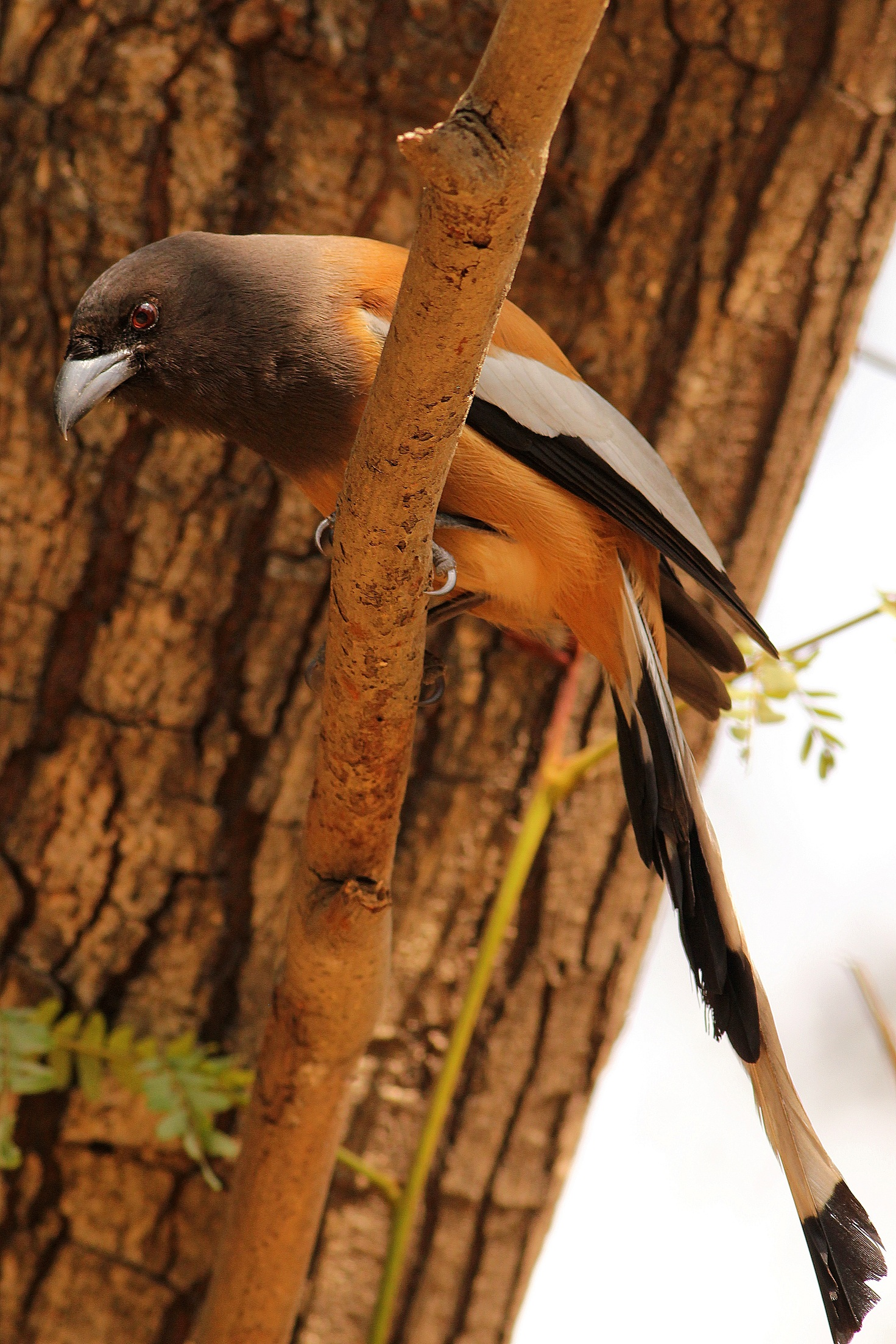
Rufous treepie

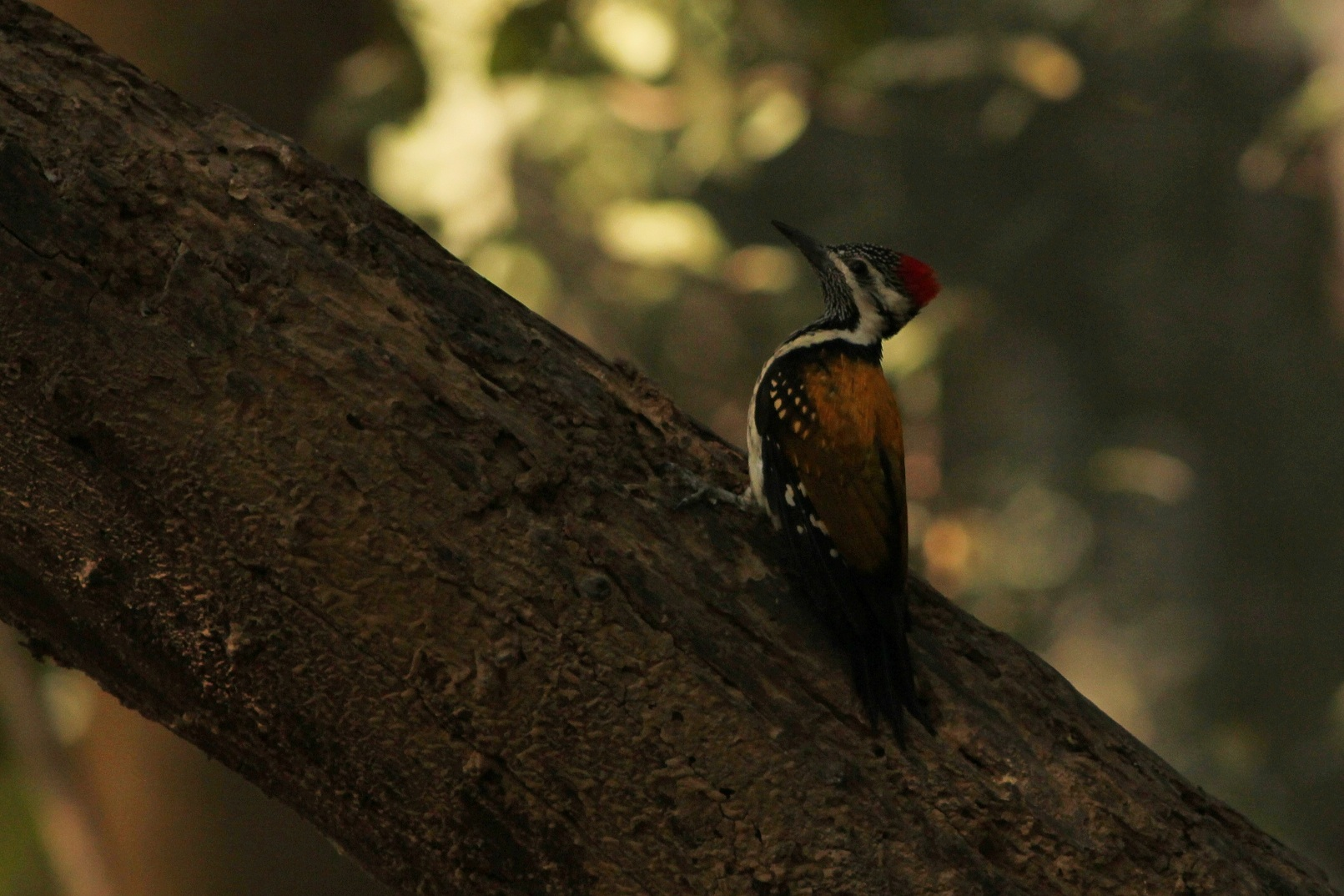
Golden flameback woodpecker

== Gallery ==
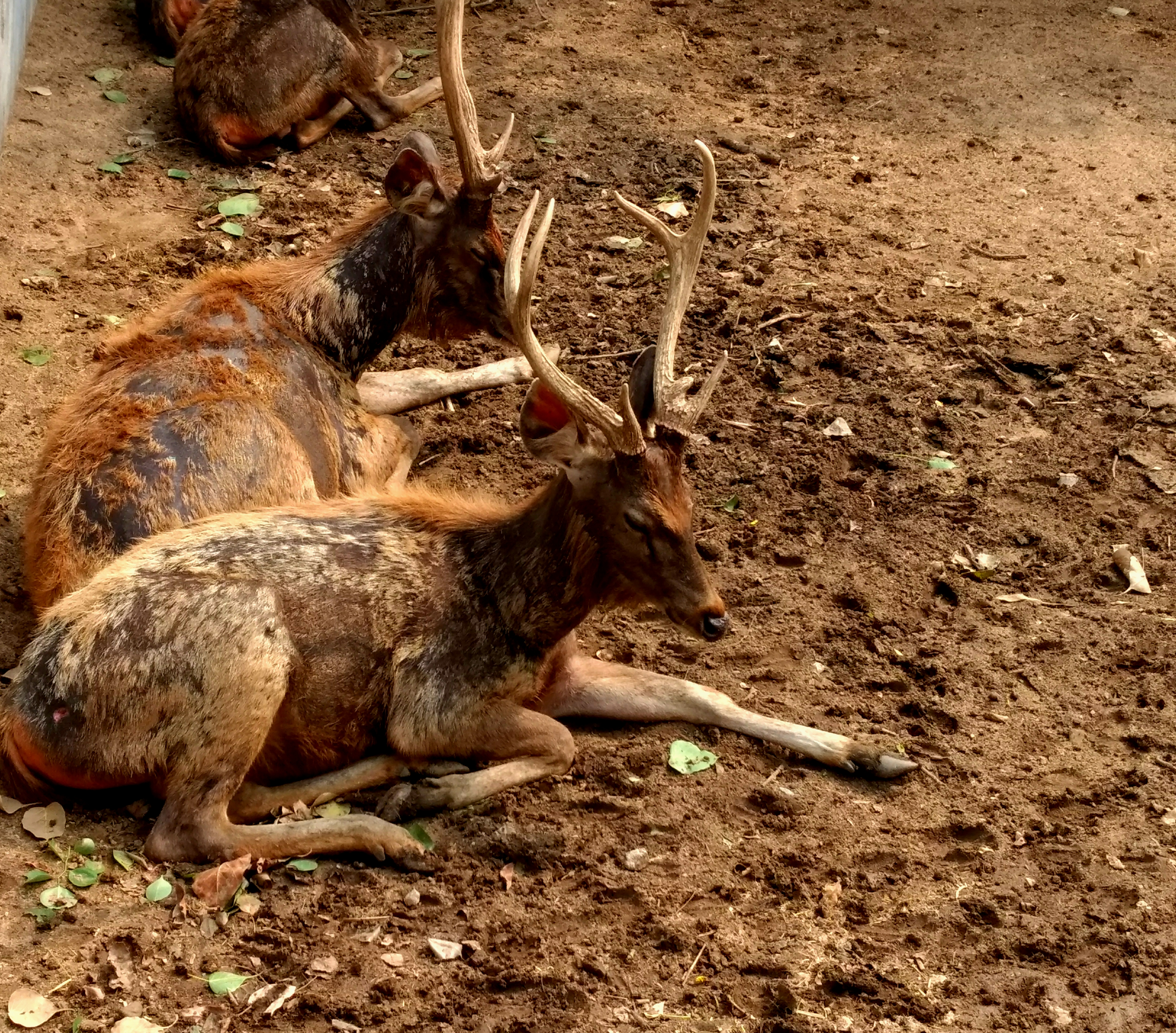
Sambar

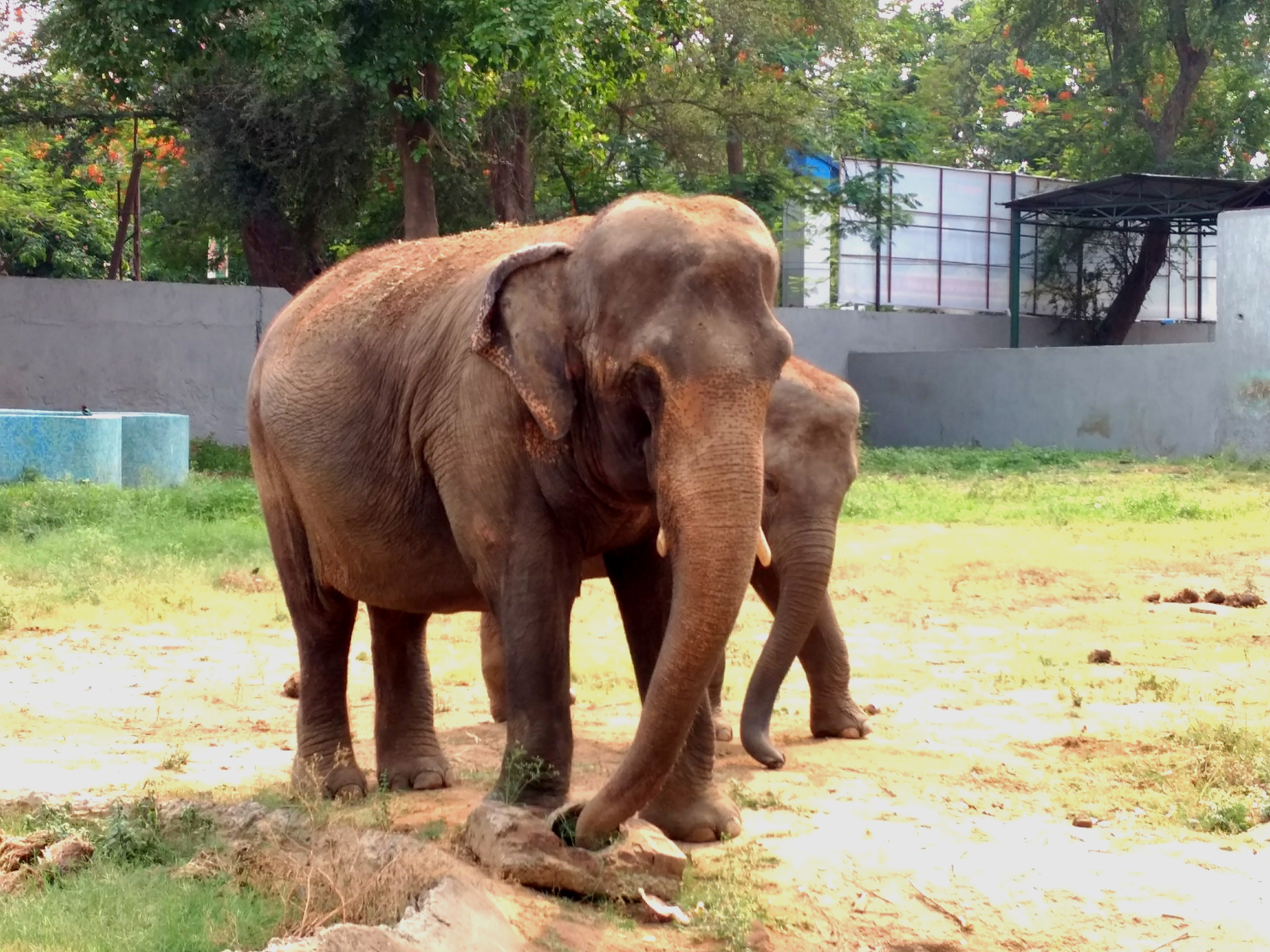
Elephant

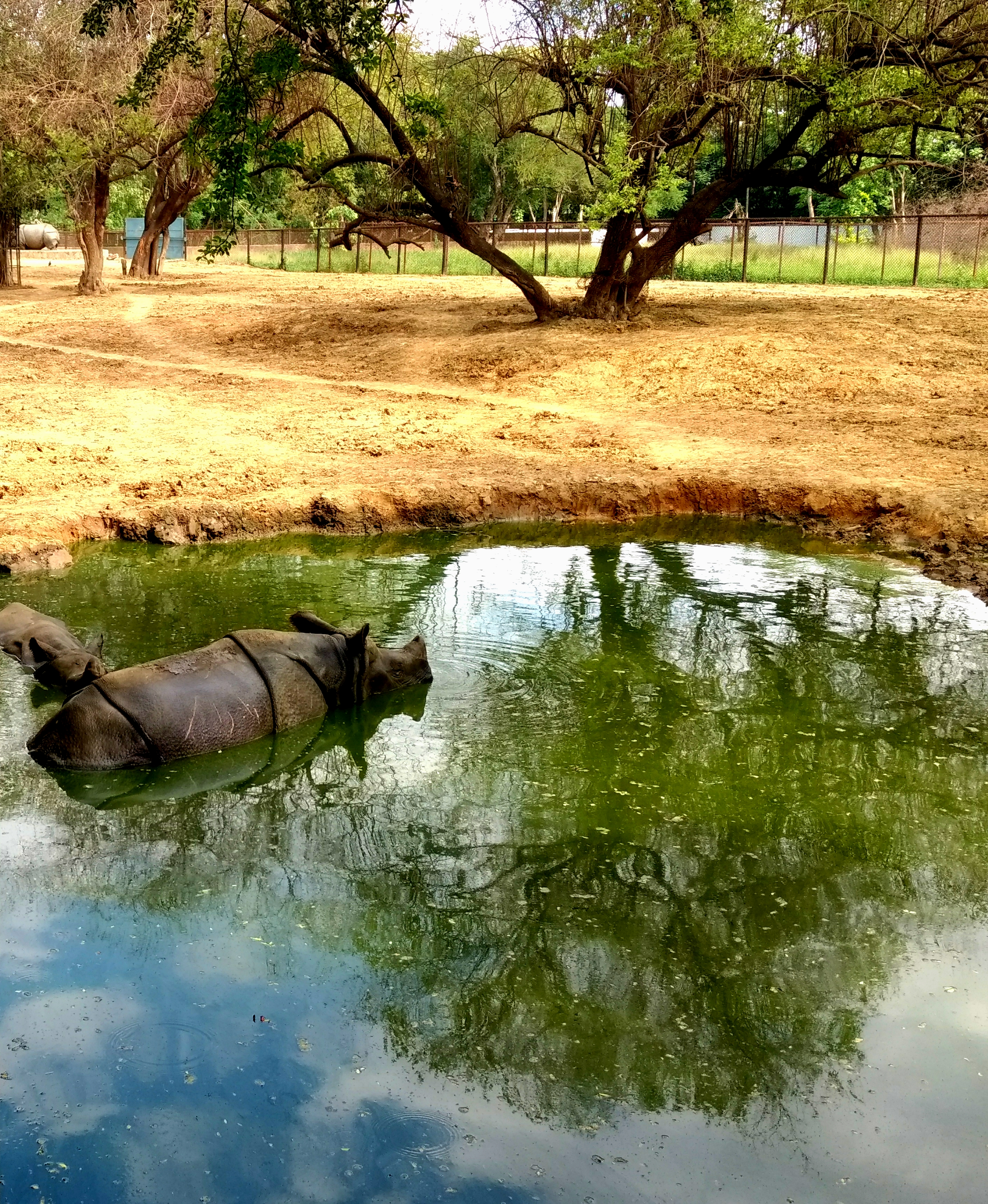
Rhinoceros

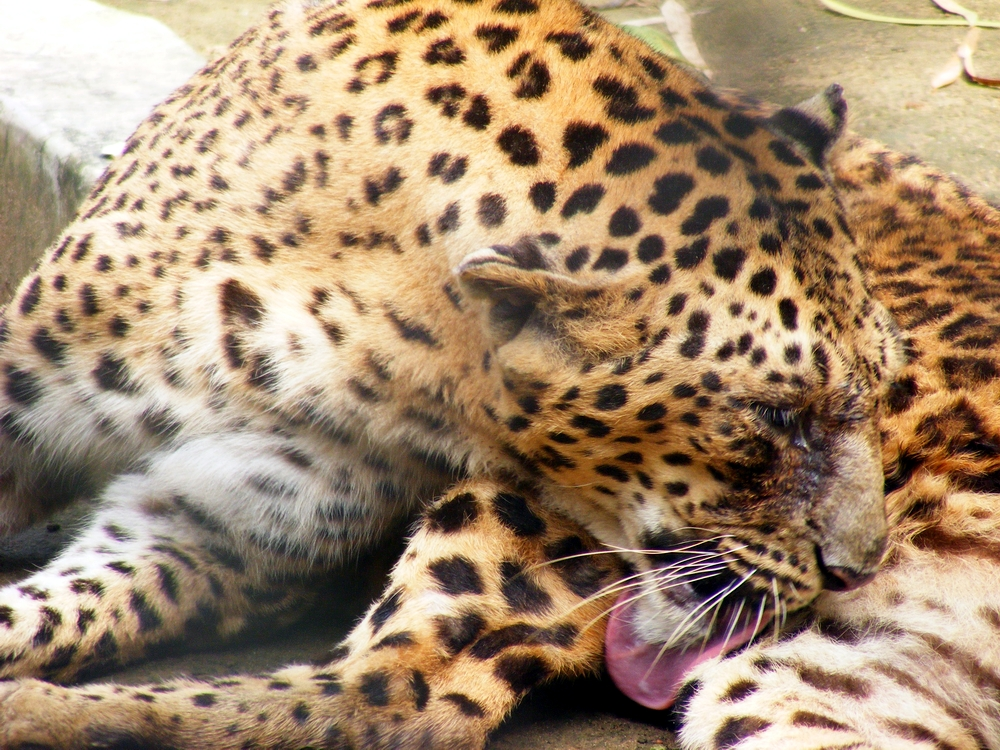
Leopard

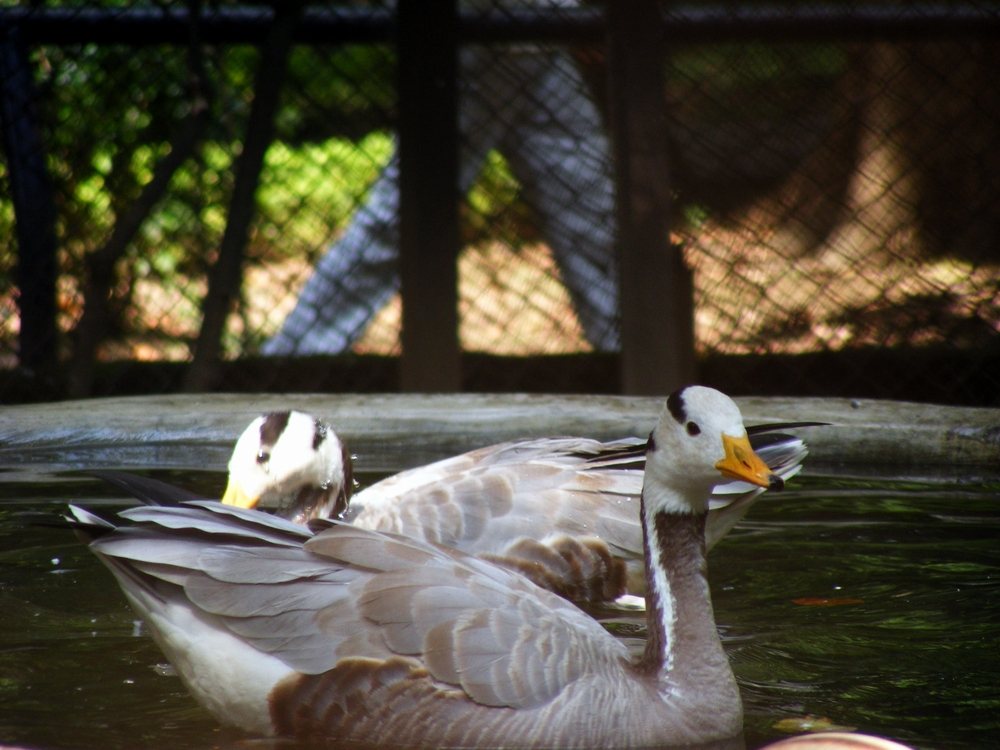
Swan

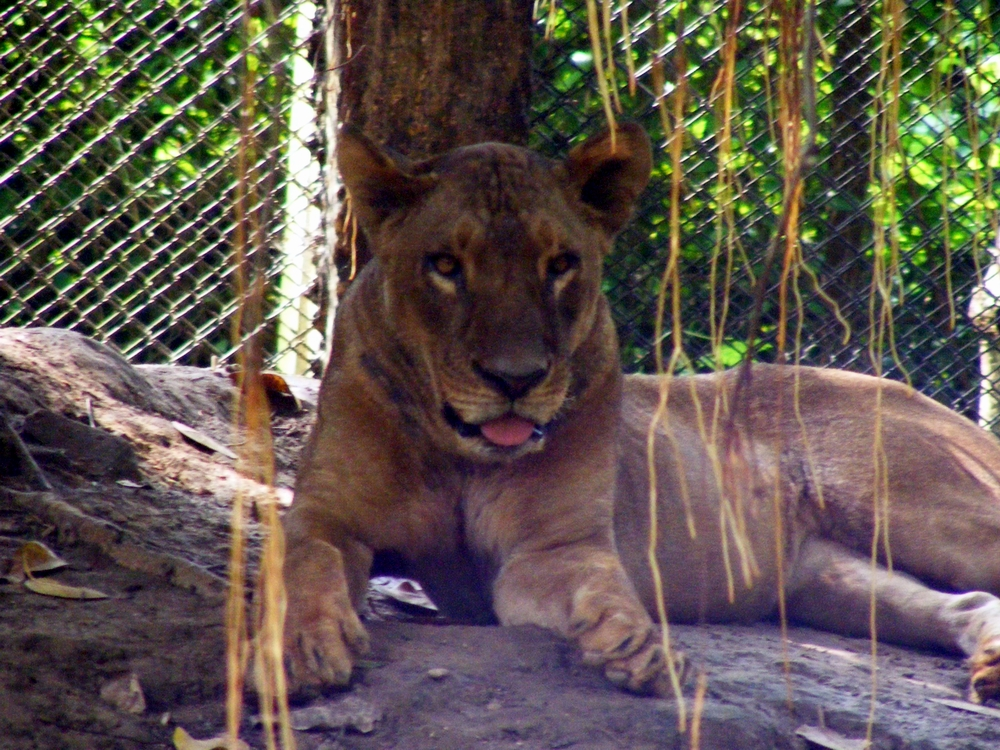
Lion

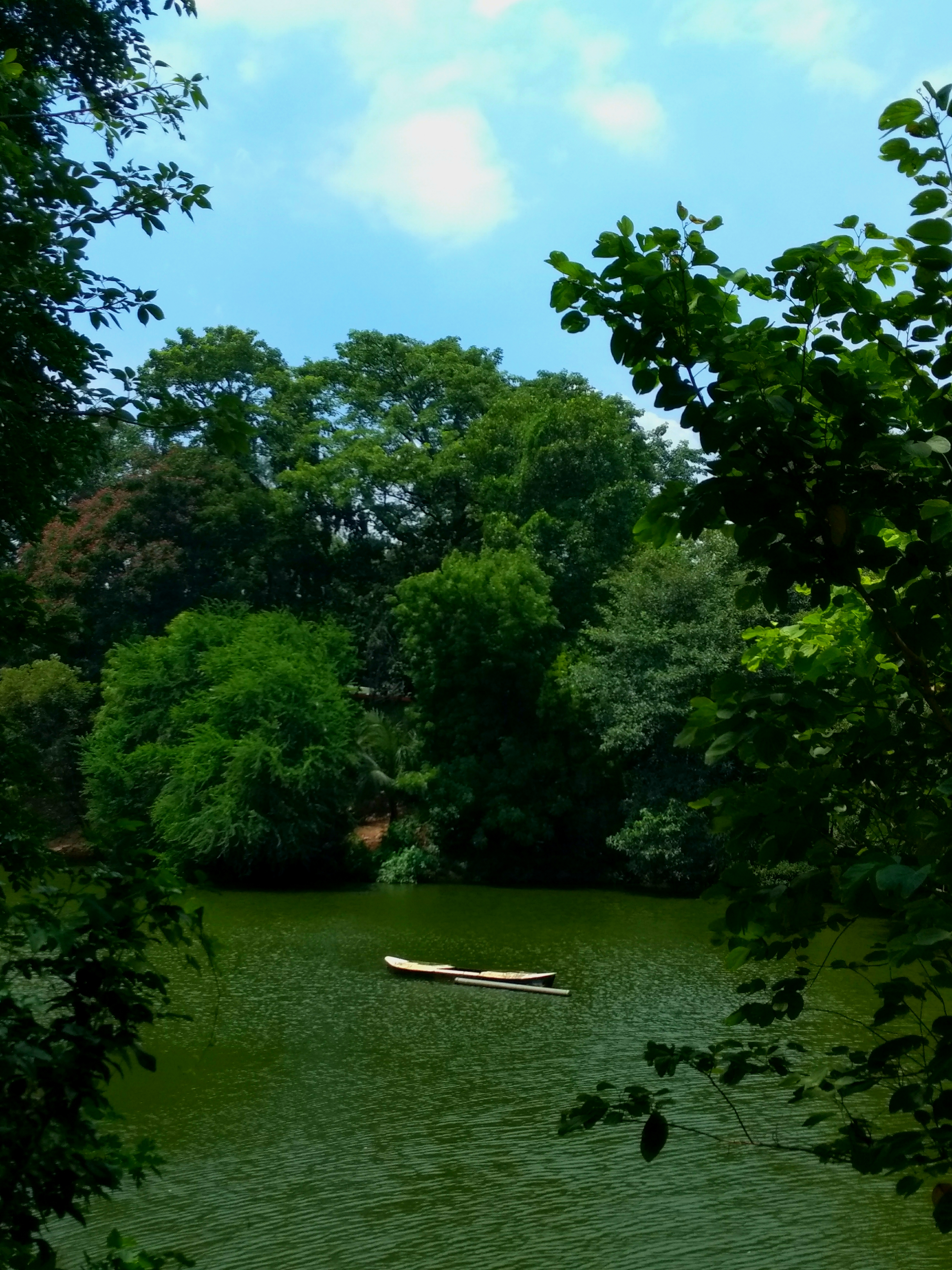
Central Lake in the zoo

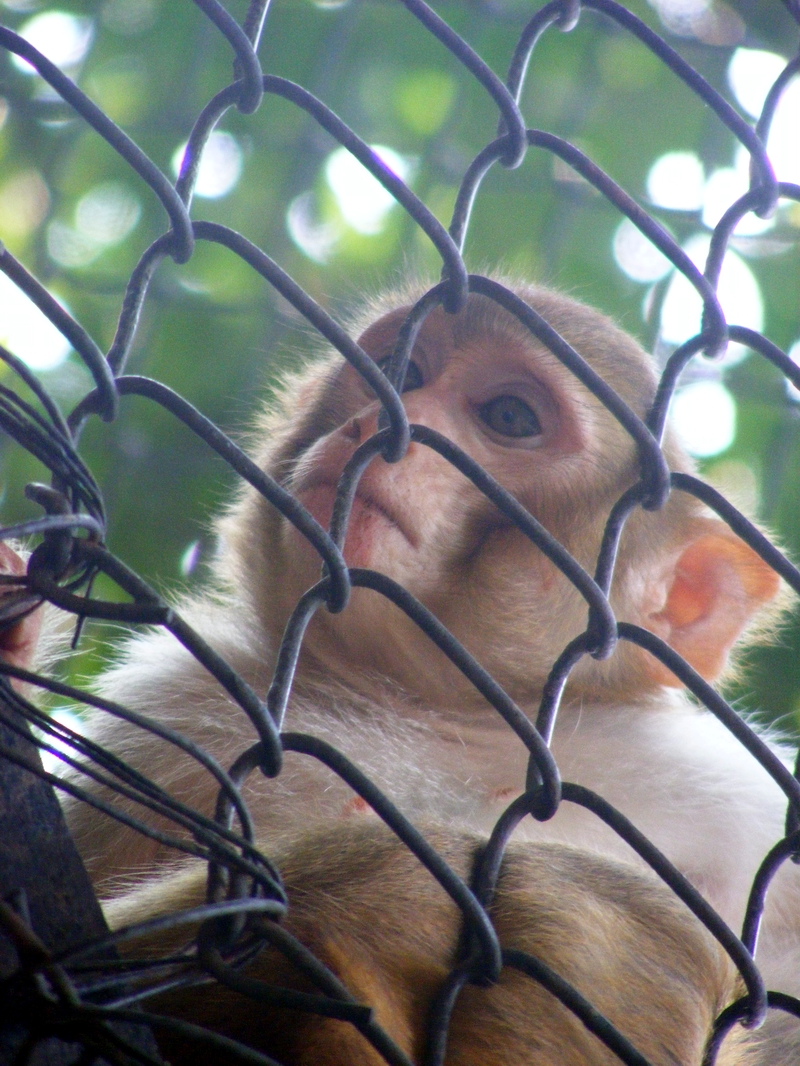
Monkey

== See also ==
- List of botanical gardens in India
- Eco Park, Patna
