= Patna Golf Club =

Golf course in Patna, India

Club information
- Location: Patna, Bihar, Patna
- Established: 1916 (110 years ago)
- Type: private
- Total holes: 18
- Tournaments: Achiever's Cup, Basant Utsav, Captain's Day, Heat & Dust Golf Tournament, Kalyan Cup, Knockout Cup, Sawan Cup, Annual Patna Open Golf Tournament
- Website: patnagolfclub.in

The Patna Golf Club was established on 21 March 1916. The land originally belonged to the government of Bihar and Orissa, and was leased to the South Bihar Gymkhana Club. The club was formed by Steuart Bayley, among others, who later became the Governor of Bihar. It has hosted many national championships from 1916. The membership requires ₹2-3 lakhs per head for lifetime. In 2004, during an open professional tournament, a number of local residents attacked the club, burning the main gate and damaging other buildings. The residents were angered because while the club had traditionally allowed non-members to use the grounds for exercise until 7:00 am, the managers decided to remove non-members at 6:00 am for tournament preparations.

== Club Management ==
The club is managed by a committee consisting of a President, a vice-president, a captain, a Secretary, a Joint-Secretary and a Treasurer among other members. The committee is elected by the permanent and life members every year in the month of September by secret ballot. His Excellency The Governor of Bihar is the chief patron of the club.

The executive committee for the year 2022-23 consist:

President: Hon'ble Justice Mr Anil Kumar Sinha; Vice-president: Mr Tapan Kumar Ghosh & Mr. Rohit Ahluwalia; Secretary: Mr Arvind Singh; Captain: Mr Kumar Tripurari Singh; Hony. Treasurer: Mr Sudhir Kumar Shahi; Member: Mr Roshan Sharan; Member: Mr Aakashdeep; Member: Mr Gyanesh Pratap Singh; Member: Mr Amar Raj; Member: Mr Subhash Kumar Patwari; Member: Mr Rohit Kriti;
