= List of gentlemen's clubs in India =

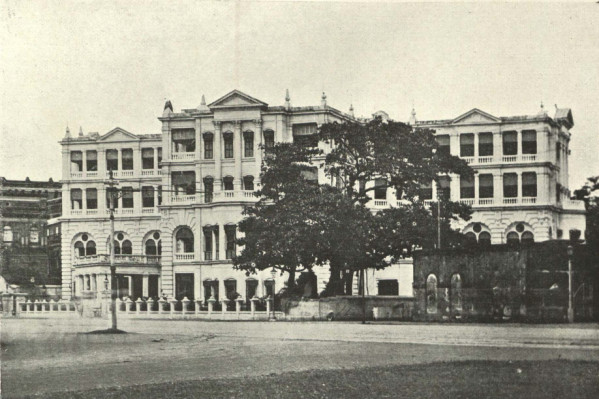
Bengal United Service Club, c. 1905

Gentlemen's clubs in India were created during the British Raj, where British Indian Army/Indian Civil Service officers went to rest after long hours of work, however several have also been created since the end of the Raj. They are mostly located in urban cities, like Bengaluru, Kolkata, Mumbai, Delhi and Chennai.

== Clubs ==
List of gentlemen's club in India established during the British Raj include:

Name	Est.	Location	Ref.
The Bengal Club	1827	Calcutta	
Royal Calcutta Golf Club	1829	Calcutta	
Madras Club	1832	Madras	
Byculla Club	1833	Bombay	
Ootacamund Club	1841	Ootacamund	
Royal Bombay Yacht Club	1846	Bombay	
Calcutta Rowing Club	1858	Calcutta	
Dalhousie Institute	1859	Calcutta	
Bankipore Club	1865	Patna	
Bangalore Club	1868	Bangalore	
Bowring Institute	1868	Bangalore	
Trichinopoly Club	1868	Trichy	
Poona Club	1868	Pune	
Royal Connaught Boat Club	1868	Pune	
Wellington Gymkhana Club	1873	Wellington	
Bombay Gymkhana	1875	Bombay	
Saturday Club	1875	Calcutta	
Mangalore Club	1876	Mangalore	
Dehradun Club	1878	Dehradun	
Secunderabad Club	1878	Secunderabad	
Waltair Club	1883	Visakhapatnam	
Madras Gymkhana Club	1884	Madras	
Nizam Club	1884	Hyderabad	
Coonoor Club	1885	Coonoor	
Ranchi Club Ltd	1886	Ranchi	
Calcutta Swimming Club	1887	Calcutta	
Chikmagalur Club	1889	Chikkamagaluru	
Trivandrum Club	1890	Thiruvananthapuram	
Tollygunge Club	1895	Calcutta	
Rama Varma Club	1897	Kochi	
Jiwaji Club	1898	Gwalior	
The Calicut Cosmopolitan Club	1898	Kozhikode	
PYC Hindu Gymkhana	1900	Pune	
Central Provinces Club	1901	Nagpur	
Deccan Gymkhana Club	1906	Pune	
Calcutta Club	1907	Calcutta	
Delhi Gymkhana	1913	New Delhi	
Banerjee Memorial Club	1914	Trichur	
New Patna Club	1918	Patna	
Willingdon Sports Club	1917	Bombay	
Tumkur Club	1921	Tumkur	
Roshanara Club	1922	Delhi	
Veera Kerala Gymkhana	1924	Thiruvananthapuram	
Lotus Club	1931	Kochi	
Gondwana Club	1932	Nagpur	
Outram Club	1934	Calcutta	
Yeshwant Club	1934	Indore	
Catholic Club	1947	Bangalore	

== See also ==
- Gymkhana
- List of gentlemen's clubs in Sri Lanka
- List of members' clubs in London
- List of gentlemen's clubs in Canada
- List of gentlemen's clubs in the United States
