= Monghyr Mutiny =

Mutiny against the East India Company

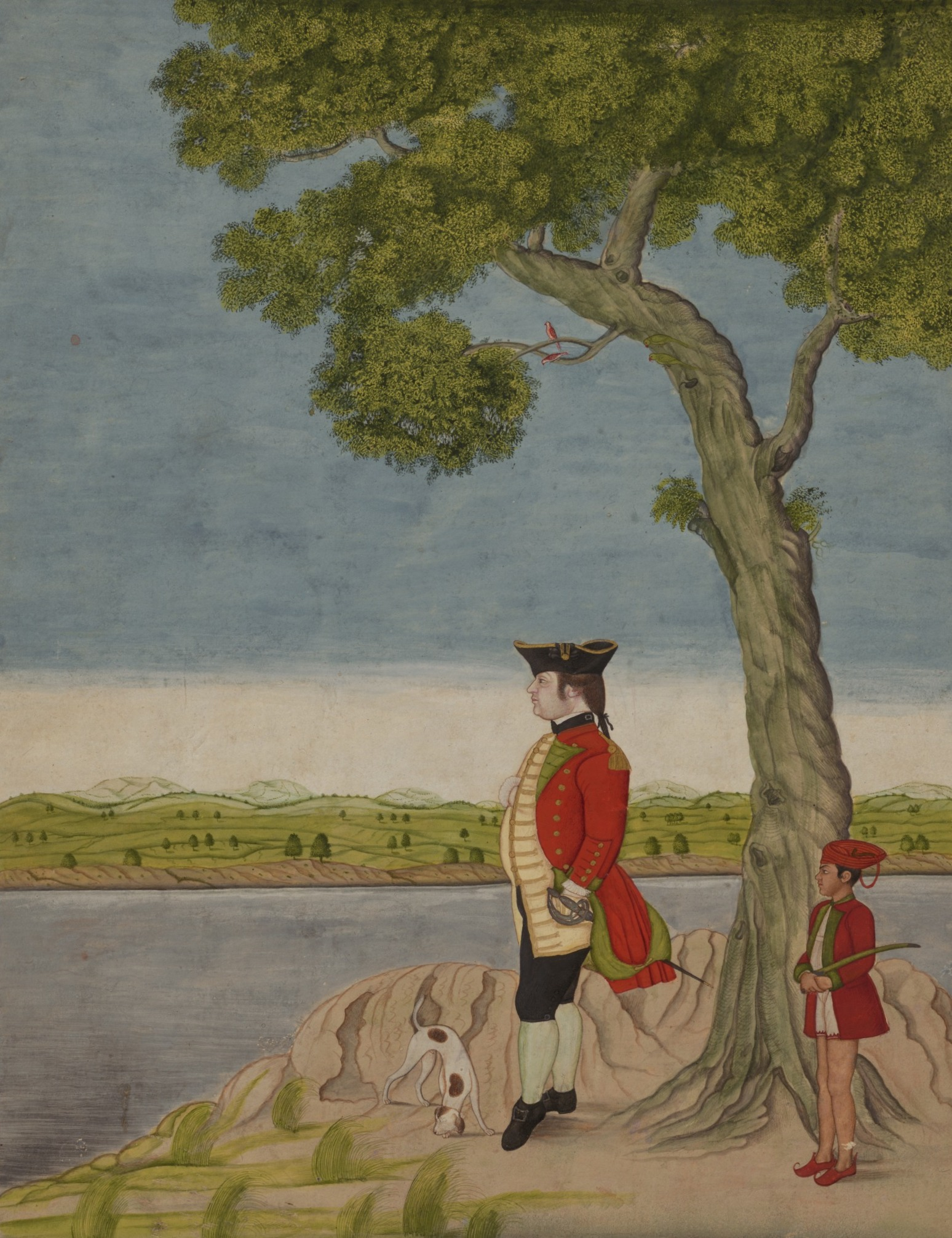
An officer of the East India Company c.1765-70

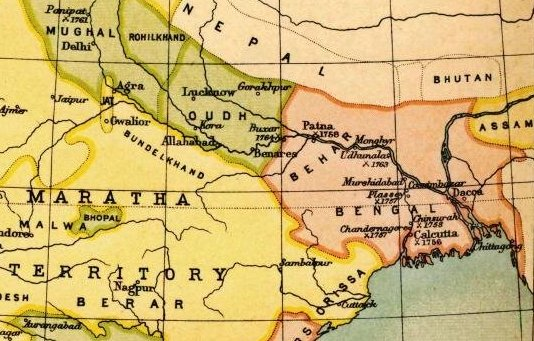
Map showing Bengal and surrounding states in 1765. The British posts at Allahabad, Patna (Bankipore), Monghyr and Calcutta are shown

The Monghyr Mutiny (also known as the White Mutiny (Note: Not to be confused with the 1858-59 White mutiny during the dissolution of the East India Company's European regiments.)) occurred among European officers of the East India Company stationed in Bengal in 1766. The mutiny arose after the East India Company's governor of Bengal, Robert Clive, implemented an order to reduce the batta field allowance paid to its army officers. The batta had been doubled while the troops were in the service of the Nawab of Bengal Mir Jafar. Clive's order came into effect on 1 January 1766 and brought the allowances into line with those paid by the company in the rest of India. At this time the company army in Bengal was divided into three brigades under the command of Sir Robert Fletcher, Richard Smith and Robert Barker.

There was some dissent against reductions to the batta and later evidence showed that plotting against Clive may have begun as early as December 1765. A scheme of mass-resignations was agreed upon and consented to by some 200 officers. The planning was carried out in secret and Clive did not learn of the impending mutiny until he received a note from Barker, via Fletcher, on 25 April stating that he had uncovered it. After this discovery the officers brought forwards their mutiny from 1 June to 1 May. Clive ordered his brigade commanders to arrest any officer who refused to do his duty and brought in reinforcements from other posts to assist him.

Clive determined that the centre of the mutiny was Fletcher's brigade at Monghyr Fort and, on 6 May, set off with a small number of men for this post. Some of Clive's officers arrived at Monghyr on 12 May and separated a number of loyal officers from the mutineers. One of the loyal officers, Captain Smith, mustered two regiments of sepoys and seized the European barracks at the fort on 14 May. Fletcher appeared and joined with Smith to quell the mutiny which was achieved without any bloodshed.

Clive arrived at the fort on 15 May and, after ensuring the post was secured, marched to Smith's brigade which was posted to the frontier to deter a Maratha invasion. The other brigades were less severely affected and only a small minority of officers were dismissed from the service for mutiny. Vacancies in Clive's command were filled with officers taken from the Madras Army. Clive determined that Fletcher had been involved in the mutiny from an early stage and he was cashiered from the service at a court-martial. The event has been described as one of the most dangerous in the history of the East India Company.

== Origins ==
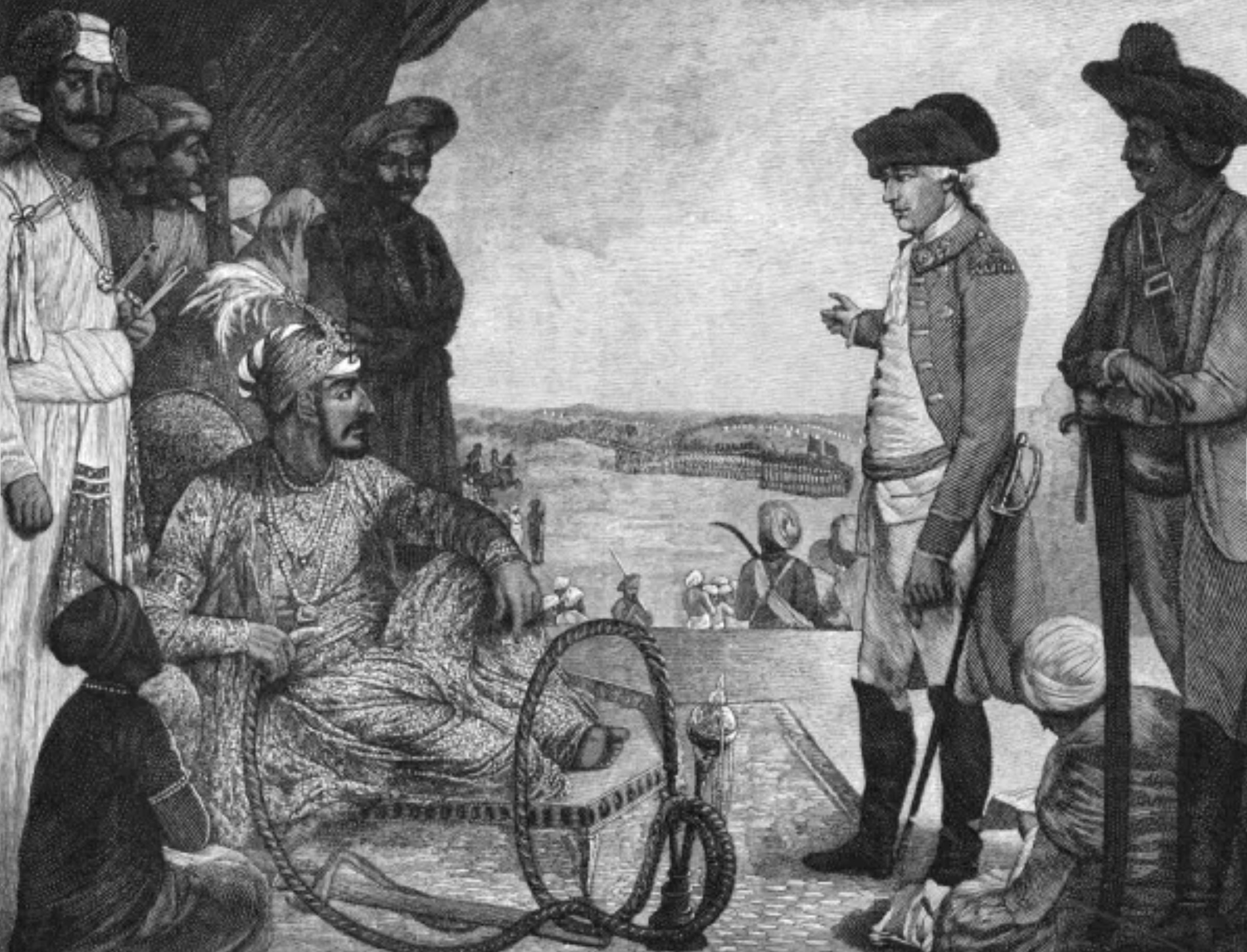
1894 illustration of Shah Alam II reviewing the British East India Company's troops in 1781

Robert Clive led British forces in India during the Seven Years' War (1756-63) against France and her allies. His victory at the Battle of Plassey in 1757 brought Mir Jafar to power as Nawab of Bengal and brought the province into the sphere of influence of the East India Company. Clive afterwards served as Governor of the company's Bengal Presidency. Clive returned to England in 1760 but failed to establish himself as a politician. Clive was appointed by the company as Governor of Bengal once more in 1765 at a time of crisis for the presidency, Mir Jafar had been deposed by Mir Qasim and the province invaded by the Mughal Emperor Shah Alam II.

Upon landing at Calcutta he found the military situation had been saved by the company's victory at the Battle of Buxar but the administration in a poor state. Clive implemented the dual-system of company rule under the nominal sovereignty of the Emperor and Nawab. Tax revenues from Bengal and Bihar were increased and he sought to restrict rampant corruption by forbidding company officials from accepting gifts or entering into commercial trade. Clive's reforms extended to the Bengal Army which had previously had no organisation above the battalion level. Clive consolidated the units into three brigades and centralised them in healthier stations than they had been posted to previously. Each brigade comprised one regiment of European infantry, (Note: European infantry regiments were formed entirely from white men in all ranks. With 18th-century wars and competition from the British Army causing a shortage of recruits the East India Company engaged contractors to source recruits from across Europe. The regiments contained men of a number of nationalities including former French, German and Swiss prisoners of war.) one company of artillery, six battalions of sepoy infantry, (Note: Clive had introduced Sepoy regiments in April 1758. These were formed from 800-1,000 Indian enlisted men with a mix of Indian and British officers. They were equipped and drilled in a semi-European fashion.) and a troop of sepoy cavalry. The First Brigade was stationed at Monghyr (Note: This article uses the contemporary British spelling of Monghyr. The town was known as Munger in the vernacular and that name is used by the modern city.) under Lieutenant Colonel Sir Robert Fletcher, the Second Brigade at Allahabad under Colonel Richard Smith and the Third Brigade at Bankipore (near Patna) under Colonel Robert Barker. The entire force numbered some 14,000–15,000 sepoys and 3,000 Europeans.

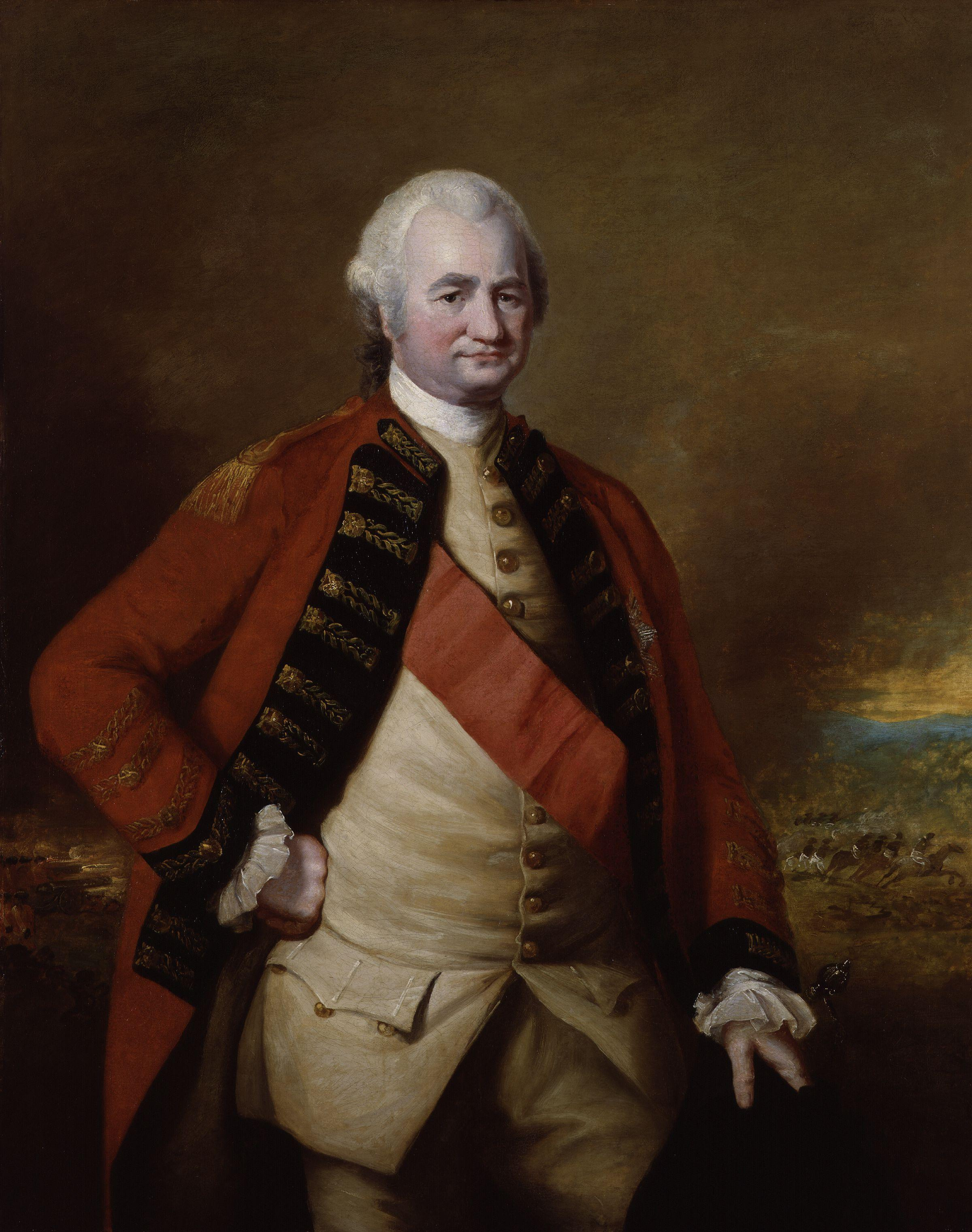
Robert Clive

The officers in the company army had previously supplemented their salaries by engaging in large scale commercial trading, at the expense of military efficiency. The officer corps had demonstrated a lack of discipline in the disorder following the distribution of price money after the February 1756 Battle of Vijaydurg, during which a number of deaths occurred. The officers had also grown accustomed to receiving an allowance, the batta, as a supplement to their salaries. This had originally been awarded to cover officers' expenses in the field and the responsibility for payment had transferred to Mir Jafar, who doubled the allowance, while the troops were in his service. Clive later claimed to have spoken to the officers at this time to caution them that the "double batta" was a strictly temporary arrangement. After the fall of Mir Jaffar, Mir Qasim refused to pay the batta and in lieu of payment offered the districts of Burdwan, Midnapore and Chittagong to the company. The revenues from these districts exceeded the cost of the batta payments so the company accepted.

In peacetime the company came to consider the batta payments an unnecessary expense and ordered Clive to withdraw the allowance. Clive ordered changes to the batta to be implemented from 1 January 1766. It was abolished completely for troops stationed in the company's factories (trading posts) and restricted to half batta for the troops of the First and Third Brigades who were in garrison. The double batta was retained for the Second Brigade while they were posted to active duty in the territory of the Nawab of Oudh, Shuja-ud-Daula, to deter a possible Maratha invasion. This would cease upon their return to Allahabad, where they were permitted a full batta payment on account of the high living expenses at that post. The payments were still in excess of those allowed to the company's officers in other regions, such as those on the Coromandel Coast, who had never received a batta. In compensation for Bengal officers, Clive allocated them a portion of the company's profits on the salt, betel-nut and tobacco monopolies.

== Planning ==
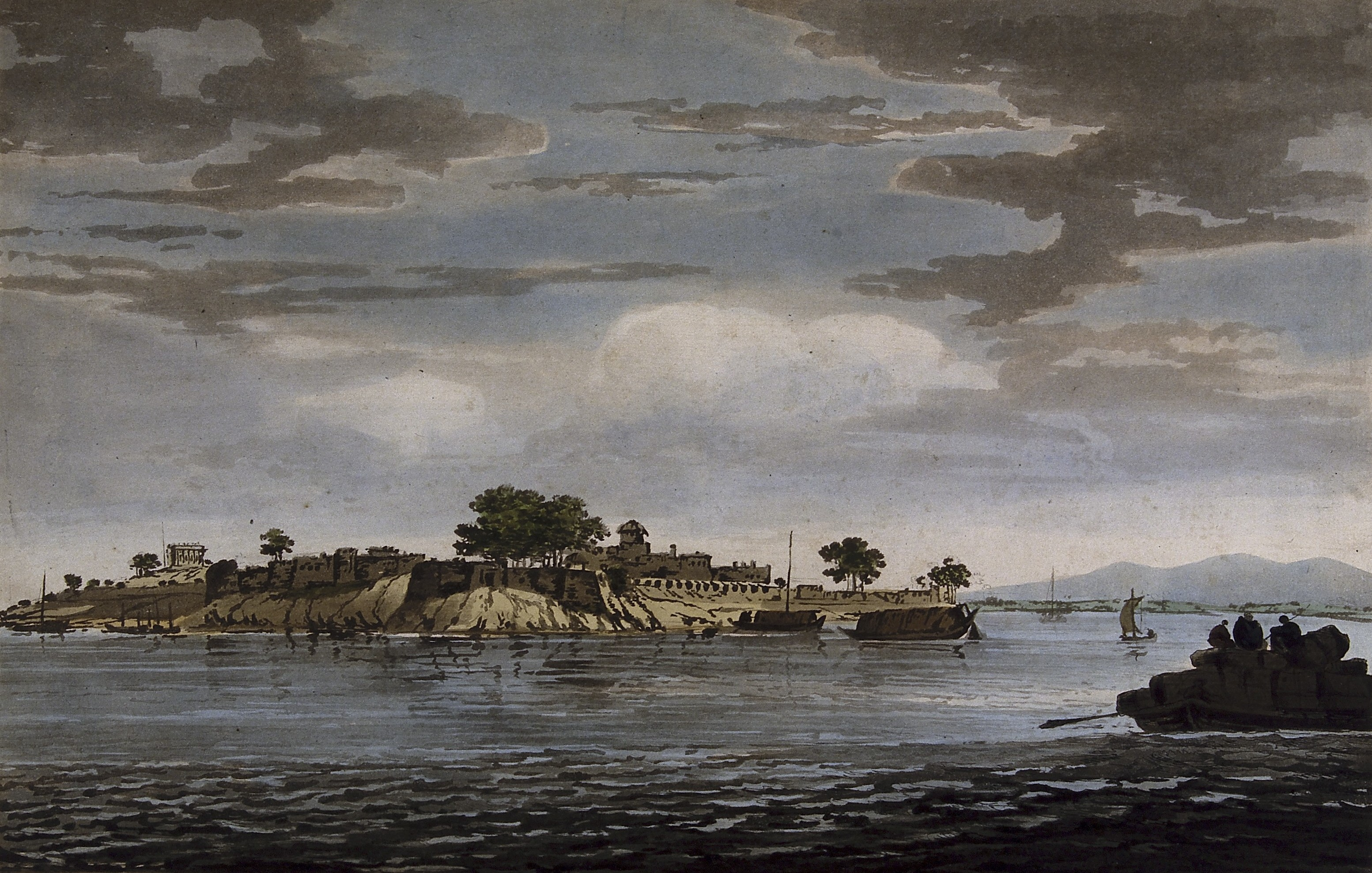
The British fort at Monghyr, depicted in 1787

Although there were complaints made to Clive over the batta order, these did not initially strike him as serious in nature. However in a report made by Clive's private secretary Henry Strachey to a secret committee of the House of Commons, from which much of the historical record of the mutiny is derived, Strachey states that he believes the mutiny had been planned as early as December 1765. An investigation later thought the mutiny had its origin at the Monghyr garrison where secret committees of officers, disguised as masonic lodges, met to plan the restoration of the batta. The officers from Monghyr appointed a correspondence officer who communicated with others appointed in the Second and Third Brigades to seek their support. The correspondence officer of the Second Brigade responded to the letter from Monghyr stating that the officers of the brigade considered themselves on active service and would not join the mutiny at this time but would do so if, upon returning to garrison, the batta payment was reduced. The Third Brigade was more committed in its resolve and there was almost unanimous support for the mutiny among its officers.

The plan was for all officers to resign their commissions en masse on 1 June 1766 if the batta order was not rescinded, though as a bargaining strategy they would agree to serve unpaid for a further two weeks to allow Clive time to meet their demands. To avoid accusations of mutiny the officers would refuse to draw their salary for June, which was paid in advance. Some 200 officers joined the plot, swearing oaths to not accept reinstatement unless the batta was restored on penalty of a fine of £500. The officers also swore oaths that they would intervene to prevent the executions of any of their comrades. Acknowledging that some officers may be dismissed from the service as a result of the action a subscription was raised among the mutineers and some of the civilians in Calcutta to pay for passage to Britain and for replacement commissions in the British Army for any such man.

== Discovery ==
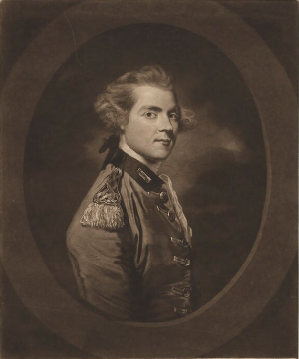
Sir Robert Fletcher

Clive first learnt of the impending mutiny by a letter from Fletcher, dated 25 April, in which he stated that the officers of his brigade had communicated their intentions to resign their commissions. Fletcher enclosed a letter from Barker which stated that he had uncovered the impending mutiny at a court martial held after a captain had attempted to force an ensign to hand over his commission. Barker claimed he had not learnt of it earlier due to being away from the cantonment on an expedition to Bettiah. The discovery of the plot seems to have convinced the mutineers to bring forwards the date of their resignations to 1 May. Clive ordered Barker and Fletcher to find those involved in the plot and arrest them, for trial by officers of Clive's choosing (they would normally be tried by officers of their own brigade). Clive received no reply to this letter and began to suspect that Fletcher may have been involved in the affair.

Clive considered that the company's order to withdraw the batta was premature but did not want to appear weak by making concessions to the officers. There was considerable ill feeling towards Clive as a result and some threats against his life were made, which he dismissed saying the officers were "Englishmen, not assassins". However, Clive worried that the threatened Maratha invasion or a spread of the mutiny to his Indian regiments would compel him to reach a settlement.

Clive wrote to Calcutta on 29 April to notify the company leadership of the mutiny and to request as many spare officers, cadets in training and European volunteers as could be found be sent to reinforce him. Although some existing military personnel were sent, the request for civilian volunteers went largely unheeded. Of around 100 men of suitable age and ability in Calcutta only two volunteers were forthcoming; these men, who stood a few weeks of parade duty in the city, were rewarded with duty free trade privileges. It seems that the mutineers wrote to their friends elsewhere in India to ask that they refuse to deploy to Bengal. When Clive discovered this he wrote to Calcutta to ask that they hold all post from Bengal.

At the same time Clive wrote to his brigade commanders to reinforce his order that the batta be reduced, to make it clear to the officers that he would not abide dissent in this matter and to request that the commanders seek support from the subedars (Note: Subedars were Indian officers in the Company's Indian battalions. Although junior to British officers of the battalion they carried out much of the day-to-day running of the unit.) in case their troops were needed. It appears that the subedars supported Clive and indicated that they would, if necessary, fire upon the mutineers.

== Suppression ==
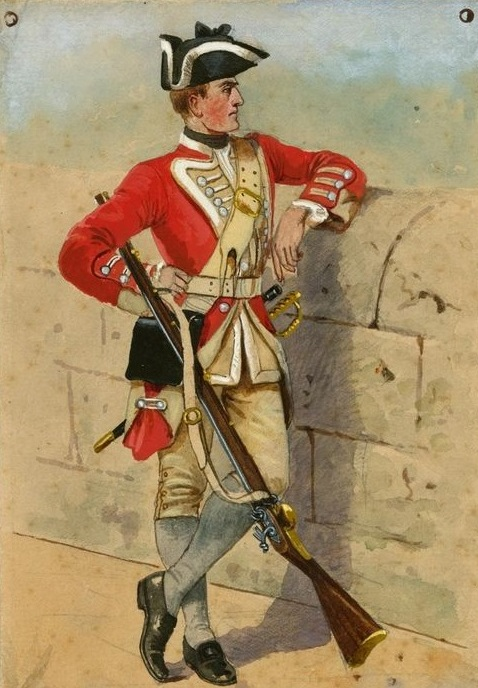
A private of the 1st Bengal European Regiment, 1756

On the new date of the mutiny, 1 May, Fletcher received the commissions of 42 of his officers and informed Clive of this. He arrested two officers and ordered them to Calcutta, but was not certain if these were the ringleaders. The mutiny was less widespread in Barker's brigade, and he refused to accept the commissions offered to him. Barker discovered his adjutant, Ensign Robertson was a ring leader and sent him and three others to Calcutta under arrest. Barker also discovered 140,000 rupees (£16,000), sent to support the mutineers from civilians in Calcutta, into which Clive requested the company investigate.

Clive gathered the few reliable officers he had to hand - his aide-de-camp John Carnac, his body guard and five others - plus a number of sepoys and marched for Monghyr on 6 May. En route he intercepted an express package containing the commissions of officers from Barker's brigade sent to the company leadership in Calcutta. Clive also received communications from Fletcher stating that he had full confidence in his officers, despite their resignations, and thought no trouble would arise. Clive also received authorisation from the company council to accept any resignations tendered and that such men should be sent to Calcutta.

At 9.00 pm on the night of 12 May a detachment of officers loyal to Clive arrived at Monghyr. They spent the next day visiting the officers there to try to persuade them to return to their duties and end the mutiny. Some of the officers alleged that Fletcher was the originator of the mutiny and had withheld information from them. Some of these officers were detached from the mutineers in the fort, while Clive's men remained in the garrison in case the mutiny came about.

On the night of 13 May night two battalions of sepoys under Captain Smith, one of the officers detached from Monghyr, were brought to the exercise ground at Monghyr from their quarters at Kharagpur. They slept on the ground and the next morning Smith proposed to Fletcher that the sepoys be brought into the fort to take charge of the principal entrances. That afternoon Fletcher ordered Smith to bring the soldiers to the barracks of the European regiment, stating that they had mutinied. Smith's sepoys seized the signal battery overlooking the barracks which seemed to forestall the European other ranks, who had drawn arms and seemed to be making moves to join their officers. Smith's men fixed bayonets and ordered the Europeans to withdraw to their quarters. At this juncture Fletcher appeared and harangued the other ranks, who replied that they had turned out in the belief that it was Fletcher's order. After granting the men two rupees apiece Fletcher ordered almost all of the officers out of the fort.

Fletcher afterwards claimed to have forestalled the mutiny, having detected it in January. Though Clive doubted this as the earliest communication he had received from Fletcher regarding the mutiny was 25 April. Arbuthnot (1899) claims that Fletcher had "played a double game" since the earliest stages of the mutiny. He alleges that he encouraged or even instigated the affair and only switched to Clive's side at the last moment.

== Clive's arrival and the other brigades ==
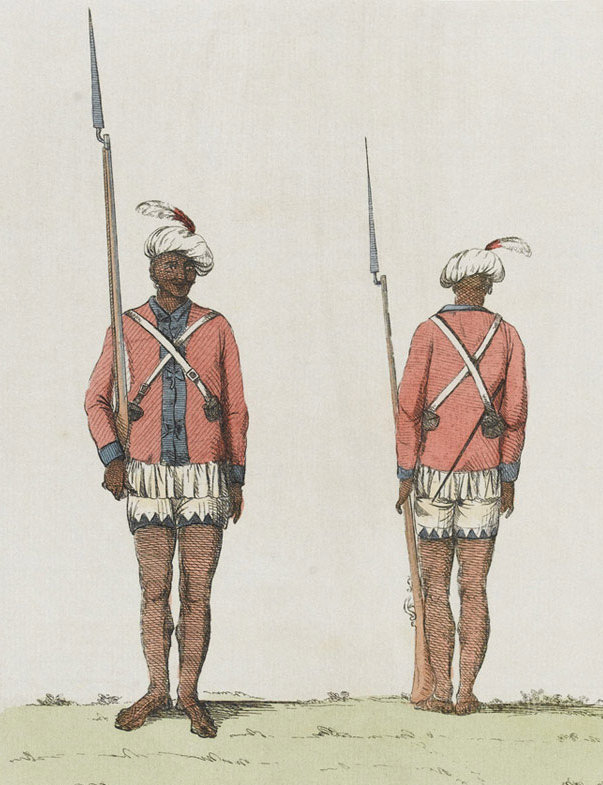
Sepoy of the third battalion of Bengal Native Infantry (raised 1769)

Clive and Carnac arrived at Monghyr on the morning of 15 May and immediately gave orders for a general inspection of the brigade to take place the following day. The garrison turned out in good order but few of their officers were present, having been sent away by Fletcher. Clive spoke, by interpreter, to the Indian soldiers. He commended them for their good behaviour, decorated several of their officers and non-commissioned officers (possible the Monghyr Mutiny Medal) and awarded the entire body two months double pay. Clive sent a detachment to the mutineer officers, encamped a few miles away, with orders that they were to go to Calcutta, which they obeyed. A small number of fresh officers sent out from Calcutta reached the post and, with around a dozen more expected in the coming days, Clive felt able to leave Monghyr on 17 May to check on Smith's Brigade on the frontier.

Colonel Smith had weathered the mutiny reasonably well. He had arrested all of his officers, bar four that he considered reliable and made a speech requesting that they obey his orders. Almost all of the officers relented and ended their mutiny, apart from six who Smith sent as prisoners to Patna. These six men were dismissed the service and sent on to Calcutta; Clive requested that the French and Dutch outposts at nearby Chandannagar and Chinsura not accept these men into their service. Smith was later authorised by Clive to pardon those officers who he chose to retain and to dismiss the remainder. All of the ensigns, many of the lieutenants and some of the captains were accepted back into the company's service. Those who rejoined were compelled to sign a contract requiring one years notice of resignation. Barker's brigade was brought up to Allahabad to reinforce the frontier against the threatened Maratha invasion but it was not necessary, the frontier remained quiet.

The mutiny in Barker's command was much smaller, his officers proved more loyal and his European enlisted men, being recent recruits, had little connection with the mutinying officers and chose not to side with them. Barker was suspicious of the artillery detachment and chose to take command of that unit himself. Because all officers in this brigade continued to serve Clive chose to restore all of the officers of that unit whose resignations he had received. Vacancies in the Bengal Army were filled with replacement officers drawn from the Madras Army. Strachey described the resulting officer corps as the best ever seen in India to that time.

== Legal proceedings ==
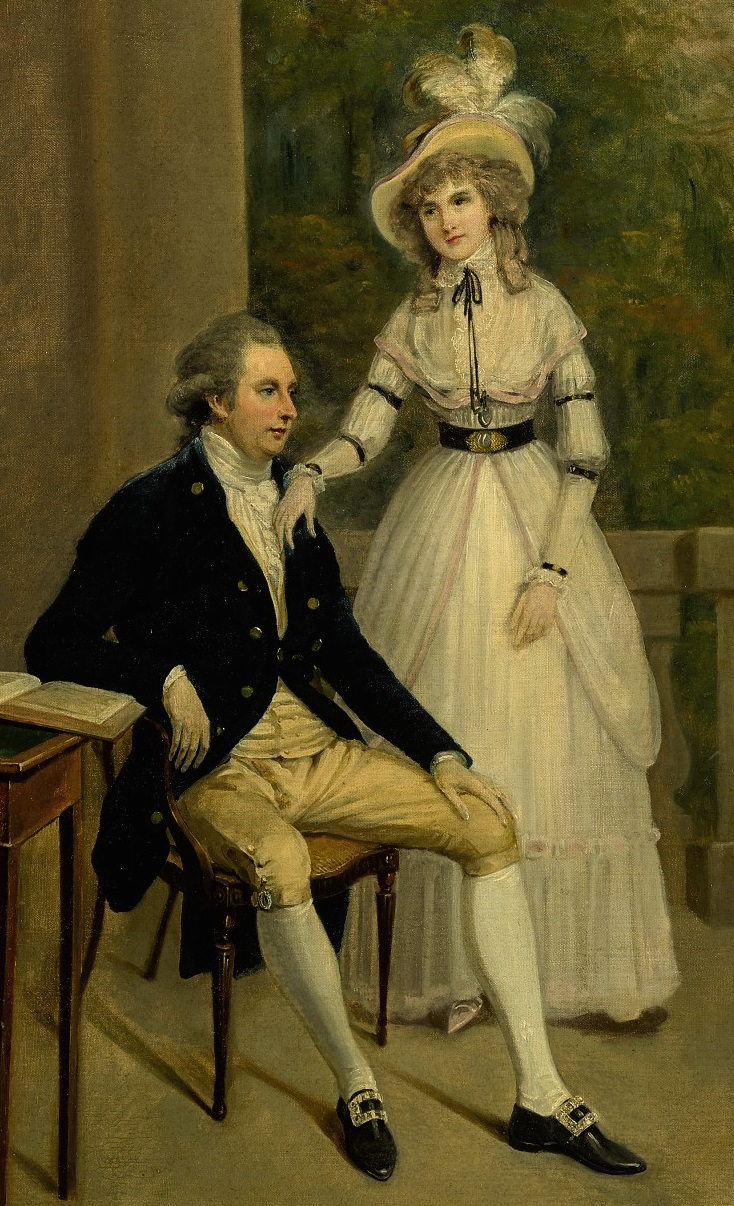
The mutineer John Petrie, who had been cashiered by Clive in 1766, depicted with his wife after his return to India as a civil administrator

The officers dismissed were ordered to leave Calcutta and British India; two refused to do so and barricaded themselves in their rooms, they were arrested a number of days later. Efforts to track down the civilians who had financed the mutiny proved unsuccessful; they had sent their communications by private means and often disguised as letters to ladies, which were unlikely to be intercepted and read.

Clive ordered Fletcher to place himself under arrest and await a court-martial for mutiny. He requested instead that he be tried by a civil court, which he thought would be more favourable, but Clive refused, noting that the offence was a matter of military law only. The court-martial heard that Fletcher may have been aware of the planned mutiny as early as December, but had not passed on this information to Clive until his letter of 25 April. Additionally it heard evidence that Fletcher had been the instigator of the mass resignations.

The court-martial found Fletcher guilty of breaching the third and fourth articles of the second section of the articles of war, for having incited sedition and failing to pass on knowledge of the intended mutiny. The court-martial was hesitant to pass a severe sentence (capital punishment was permitted for mutiny) as it considered that the act of parliament under which the mutineers were tried implied a formal contract of employment was necessary to bring a mutiny charge. The men were sentenced to be cashiered instead. At least one of the officers was subject to a formal cashiering where his sword and spontoon were broken over his head and his officer's sash cut up in front of a parade of the troops at Bankipore.

== Aftermath ==
Clive's private secretary, Henry Strachey, made a report on the mutiny to a secret committee of the British House of Commons, which was published publicly in 1773. Strachey was of the opinion that, had the mutiny over the batta succeeded, the officers would have expanded their demands to include reinstatement of their trading rights, the revocation of the ban on accepting gifts, the abolition of the control of the army by the East India Company select committee and a guarantee that new officers would not be appointed to replace them. Arbuthnot stated that "not one of Clive's other achievements have surpassed, in the courage which he evinced, and in the genius which he displayed, his suppression of this mutiny". Martin, writing in 1879, regarded the mutiny as "one of the most dangerous storms which ever menaced the power of the East India Company". A Monghyr Mutiny Medal is said in some sources to have been awarded to Indian soldiers who helped quell the mutiny, if so this would be the first medal awarded by the company in India.

Clive himself left India for the final time in January 1767, after falling ill. The reforms he put in place did much to reduce corruption among the company's officers but in spite of these, the company had to request financial support from the British government in 1772 to avoid bankruptcy. A government investigation found corruption among company officials and laid the blame with Clive, who had himself made a fortune while in India. Clive vigorously defended himself in parliament and the government later admitted he rendered "great and meritorious services to his country". With his health failing he committed suicide in November 1774.

Fletcher, upon his return to Britain, lobbied in parliament for his reinstatement and was posted to command the Madras Army in 1772, after Clive withdrew his opposition. Fletcher came into conflict with the Madras governor, Josias Du Pre, and was dismissed from the council. He returned home in 1773 but was posted again to India in 1775 to command the Madras Army. Fletcher came into dispute with the new governor Lord Pigot, which culminated in Pigot's arrest. Fletcher afterwards fell ill with tuberculosis and died whilst on a convalescent sea voyage. One of Fletcher's fellow mutineers, Thomas Goddard, also later became a general. Another, John Petrie, returned to India as a company employee in a high-ranking civil appointment.

With the expansion of British India, Monghyr lost its importance as a frontier garrison. Though regarded as a "healthy station", it was used as a hospital for British and Indian troops and as a clothing depot. The district was not troubled during the sepoy mutiny of 1857.

== Bibliography ==
- Arbuthnot, Sir Alexander John (1899). Lord Clive: The Foundation of British Rule in India (PDF) (Builders of Greater Britain ed.). London: T. Fisher Unwin.
- Chakravorty, B. (1995). Stories of Heroism: PVC & MVC Winners. Allied Publishers. ISBN 978-81-7023-516-3.
- Fisher, Michael H. (1997). Introduction and biographical essay to: The Travels of Dean Mahomet. Berkeley: University of California Press.
- Kaye, John; Malleson, George Bruce (2010). Kaye's and Malleson's History of the Indian Mutiny of 1857-8. Cambridge University Press. p. 152. ISBN 978-1-108-02323-8.
- Martin, Robert Montgomery (1879). Our Indian Empire and the Adjacent Countries of Afghanistan, Beloochistan, Persia, Etc., Depicted and Described by Pen and Pencil. London Print. and Publishing Company.
- O'Malley, L. S. S. (2007). Bihar And Orissa District Gazetteers : Monghyr (1926 ed.). New Delhi: Logos Press. ISBN 978-81-7268-135-7.
- Reid, Stuart (2012). Armies of the East India Company 1750–1850. Bloomsbury Publishing. ISBN 978-1-84908-096-5.
- Strachey, Sir Henry (1773). Narrative of the Mutiny of the Officers of the Army in Bengal, in the Year 1766. Becket.
