= Country club =

Private club typically offering recreational sports and entertainment facilities

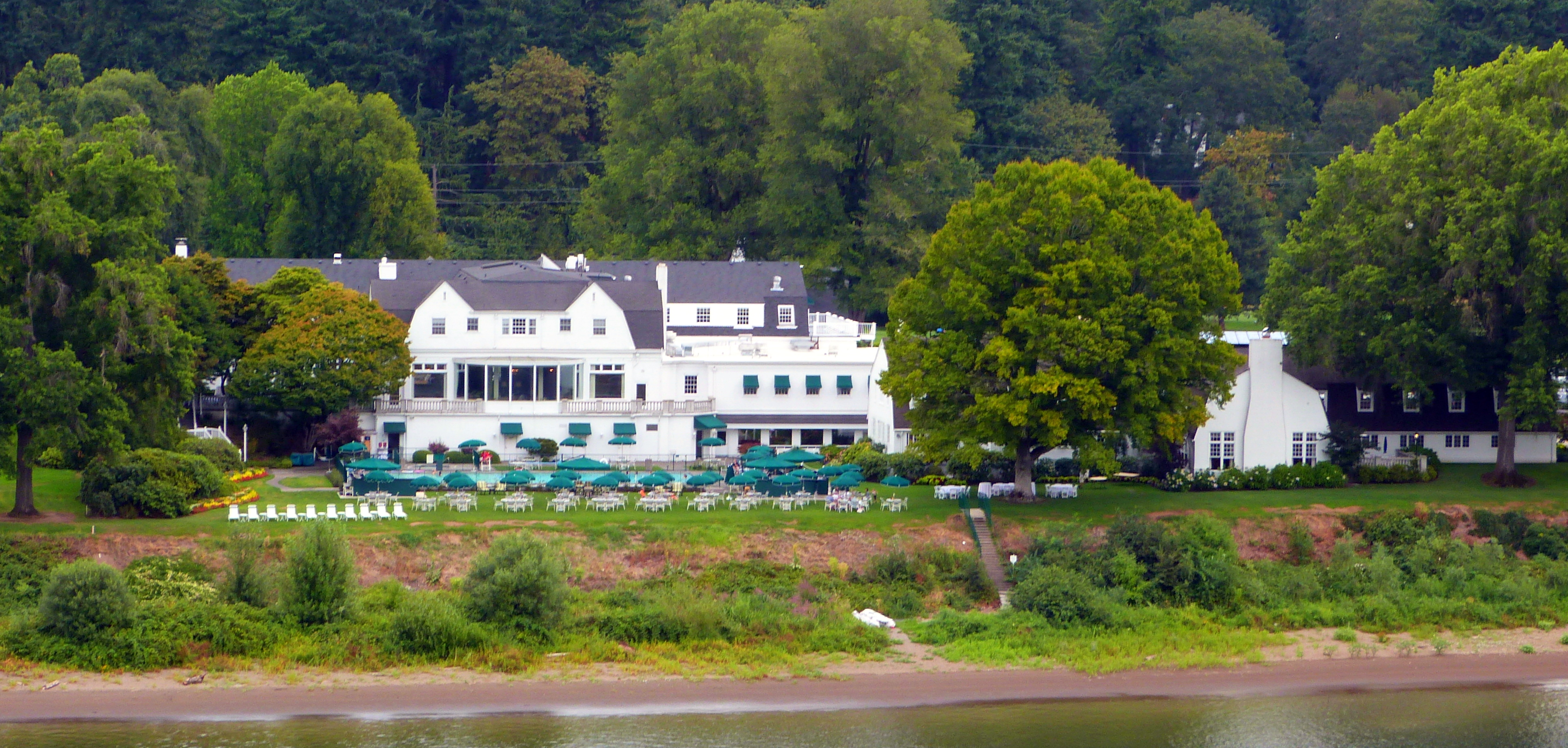
Waverley Country Club in Oregon, United States

A country club is a privately owned club, often with a membership quota and admittance by invitation or sponsorship, that generally offers both a variety of recreational sports and facilities for dining and entertaining. Typical athletic offerings are golf, tennis, and swimming. Where golf is the principal or sole sporting activity, and especially outside of the United States and Canada, it is common for a country club to be referred to simply as a golf club. Many country clubs offer other new activities such as pickleball, and platform tennis.

Country clubs are most commonly located in city outskirts or suburbs, because of the need for substantial grounds for outdoor activities. This factor distinguishes them from an urban athletic club.

Country clubs originated in Scotland and first appeared in the US in the early 1880s. Country clubs had a profound effect on expanding suburbanization and are considered to be the precursor to gated community development.

== By nation ==
=== United States and Canada ===
Country clubs can be exclusive organizations. In small towns, membership in the country club is often not as exclusive or expensive as in larger cities where there is competition for a limited number of memberships. In addition to the fees, some clubs have additional requirements to join. For example, membership can be limited to those who reside in a particular housing community. Early clubs focused primarily on equestrian-related sports: coaching, racing, jumping, polo, and foxhunting. In the 1980s, the nationwide interest shifted more towards golf.

Country clubs were founded by upper-class elites between 1880 and 1930. The Brookline Country Club was founded in 1882 and is esteemed to be the nation's first by the Encyclopaedia of American Urban History. By 1907, country clubs were claimed to be "the very essence of American upper-class." The number of country clubs increased greatly with industrialization, the rise in incomes, and suburbanization in the 1920s. During the 1920s, country clubs acted as community social centers. When people lost most of their income and net worth during the Great Depression, the number of country clubs decreased drastically for lack of membership funding.

Historically, many country clubs were "restricted" and refused to admit members of specific racial, ethnic or religious groups such as Jews, African Americans and Catholics. Beginning in the 1960s civil rights lawsuits forced clubs to drop exclusionary policies. In a 1990 landmark ruling at Shoal Creek Golf and Country Club, the PGA refused to hold tournaments at private clubs that practiced racial discrimination. This new regulation led to the admittance of black people at private clubs. The incident at Shoal Creek is comparable to the 1966 NCAA basketball tournament, which led to the end of racial discrimination in college basketball.

The Philadelphia Cricket Club is the oldest organized country club in the United States devoted to playing games, while The Country Club in Brookline, Massachusetts is the oldest club devoted to golf.

=== Spain ===
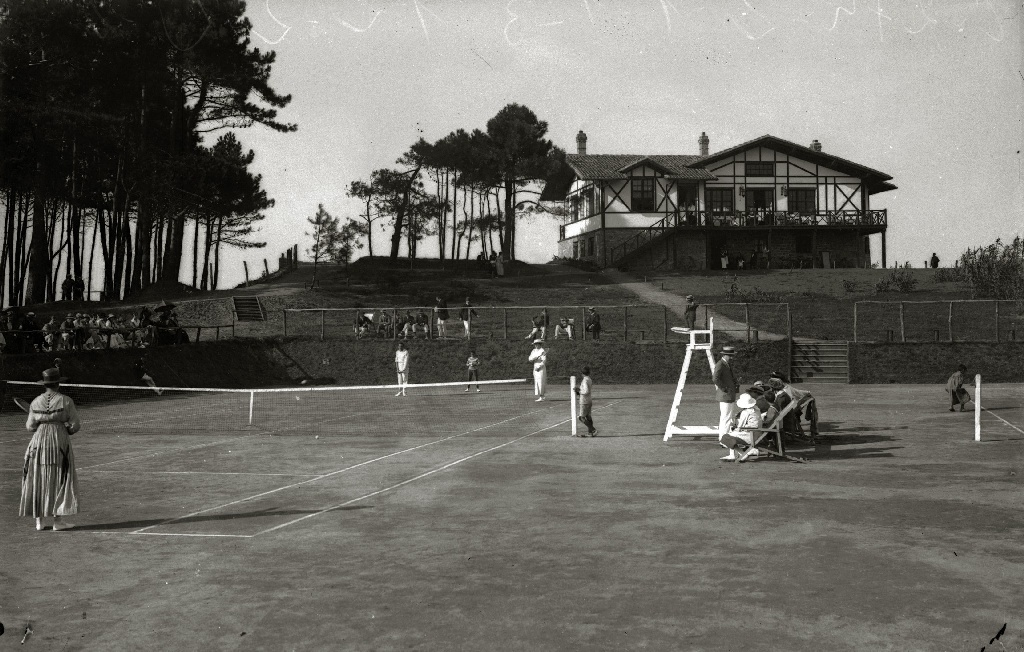
Tennis being played at Real Golf Club de Zarauz, 1916

Similar to the United States, Spain has had a tradition of country clubs as a pillar of social life. This began during the reign of Alfonso XII and was consolidated during the reign of his son and successor Alfonso XIII, who granted royal status to a handful of country clubs. Most country clubs in Spain are typically associated with the upper classes, and were conceived around a central sport such as golf, polo or tennis, although some of them did eventually offer other sports. Examples include Real Club de la Puerta de Hierro, Club de Campo Villa de Madrid, Real Club de Polo de Barcelona, Real Sociedad de Golf de Neguri, Real Club Pineda etc. Many of them are also located in those cities or towns that hosted the summer vacations of the royal family. Such is the case of Real Sociedad de Tenis de la Magdalena, Real Golf de Pedreña or Real Golf Club de Zarauz for example.

=== Indian subcontinent ===
Many of the gentlemen's clubs established during the British Raj are still active in major cities, for example the Bangalore Club, Lahore Gymkhana, Karachi Gymkhana, Nizam Club, and Bengal Club.

Gymkhanas are sporting or social clubs across the subcontinent.

=== Australia ===
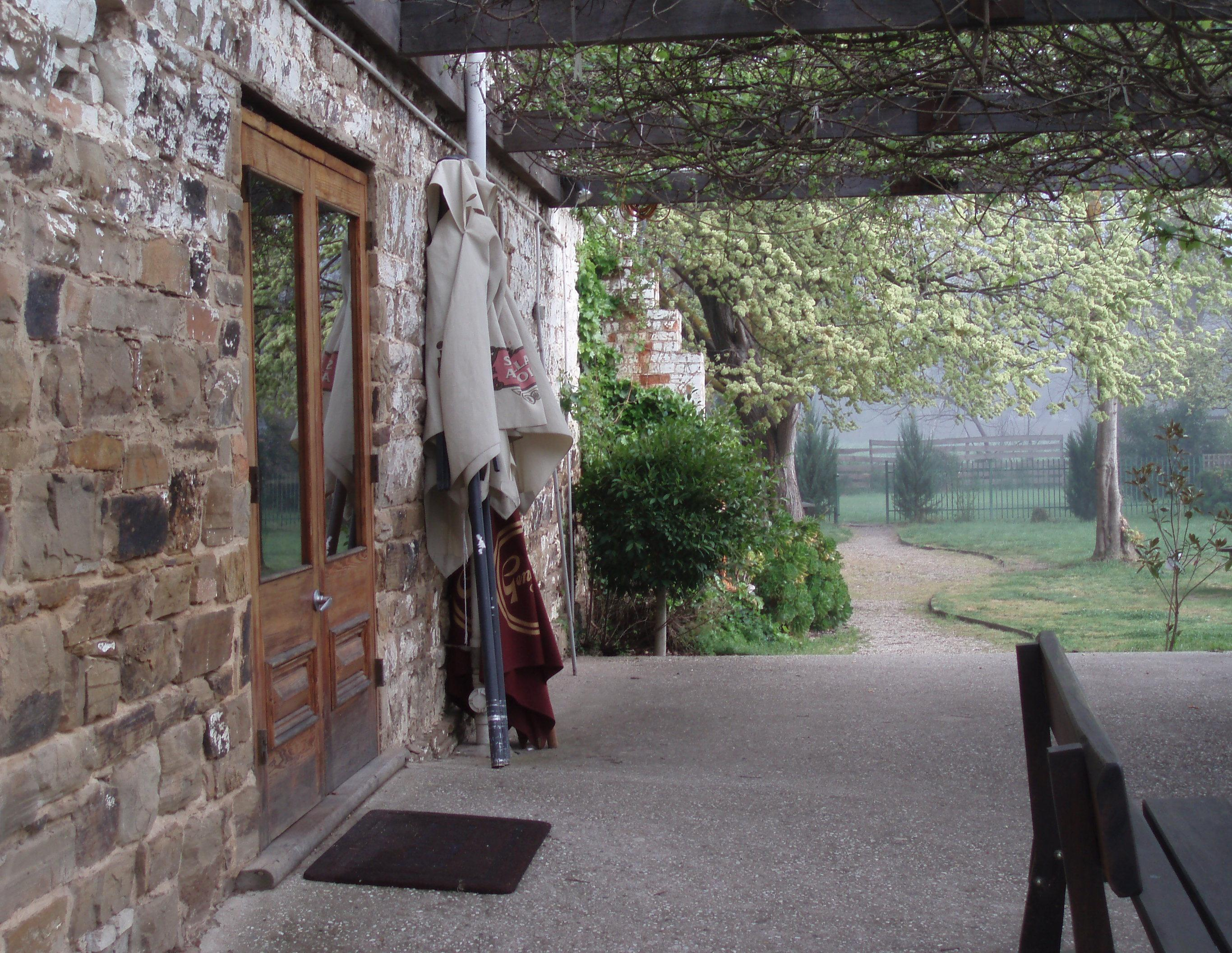
A beer garden at an Australian country club.

Country clubs exist in multiple forms, including athletic-based clubs and golf clubs. Examples are the Breakfast Point Country Club, Cumberland Grove Country Club and Terrey Hills Golf & Country Club in Sydney, the Castle Hill Country Club, the Gold Coast Polo & Country Club, The Heritage Golf and Country Club, Elanora Country Club, and the Sanctuary Cove Golf & Country Club.

=== Japan ===
In Japan, almost all golf clubs are called "Country Clubs" by their owners.

== See also ==
- Jewish country club
- Membership discrimination in California clubs

== Bibliography ==
- Espinosa de los Monteros, Patricia (2020). Clubs Históricos de España. Ediciones El Viso. ISBN 978-84-12084-62-7.
