= Ramesh Barial =

Indian educationist

Ramesh Nandan Prasad Barial

Principal, Patna Training College, Patna University
- In office 1 February 1992 – 31 Dec 1996
- Preceded by: S. N. Sharma
- Succeeded by: Indira Jha

Personal details
- Born: 31 August 1934 Shiv Bhawan, B. M. Das Road, Patna, Bihar
- Died: 11 March 2008 (aged 73) Patna, Bihar, India
- Spouse: Dr. Pusplata Lal
- Education: Patna University

Ramesh Nandan Prasad Barial (Hindi: प्रो॰(डा॰)रमेश नंदन प्रसाद बरियाल; 31 August 1934 – 11 March 2008) was an eminent educationist in India. He retired in 1996 as university professor and principal of Patna Training College, Patna University. Before that he was head, postgraduate department of education, dean, faculty of education. Apart from his valuable contribution to the research in educational psychology he was actively involved in an "Education for all" campaign. He had a vision of literacy for everybody, especially women, so he became part of the Centre for Adult and Continuing Education at its inception and later became the director of the centre.

He was the first scholar to receive a Ph.D. degree in the faculty of education in Bihar. For this he received a prestigious fellowship from Dr. Rajendra Prasad, the first president of the Republic of India. Every year Prof. R.N.P. Barial Memorial Gold Medal is awarded to four toppers at the Patna University convocation from 2018 onwards. The medals are awarded to women toppers in M.Ed., B.Ed., M.Com. and male topper in B.Ed.
