= Monghyr Mutiny Medal =

Campaign medal

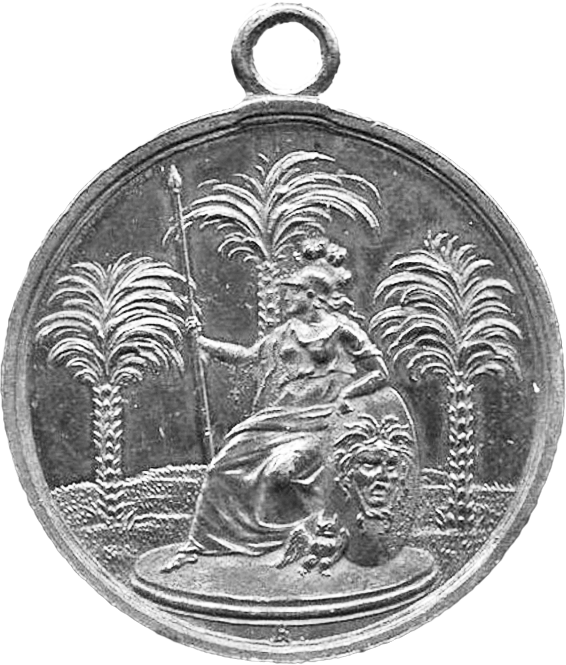
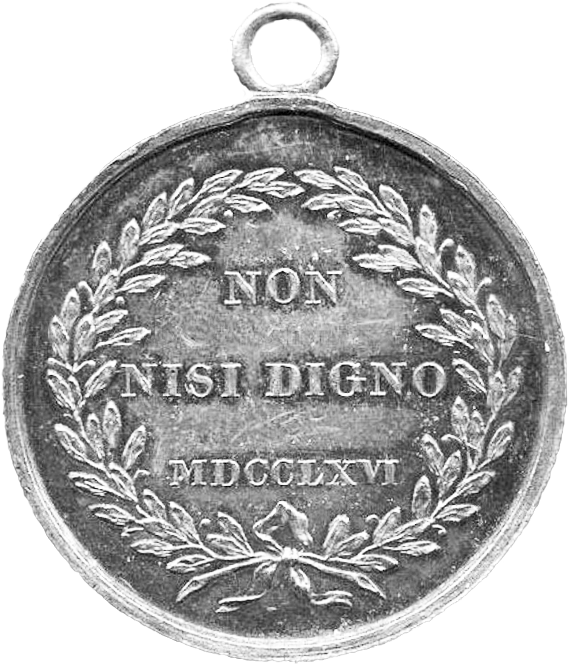
- Obverse and reverse of the Minerva medal, identified by some sources as the Monghyr Mutiny Medal
- Type: Campaign medal
- Awarded for: Campaign service
- Presented by: the East India Company (EIC)
- Eligibility: Native EIC forces
- Campaign(s): Monghyr Mutiny
- Clasps: None
- Status: Unclear if ever awarded
- Established: 1766
- Suspension cord for other early EIC medals

The Monghyr Mutiny Medal is a possible early campaign medal of the British East India Company. Robert Clive is known to have decorated a number of sepoys for their service in the Monghyr Mutiny. A campaign medal is listed in some sources as having been awarded, and both the National Army and Victoria and Albert Museums hold a medal depicting Minerva, which they attribute to this action. Other sources dispute this and identify the Minerva medal as being awarded by a Freemasons lodge in Leipzig. If awarded, the medal would have been the earliest of those issued by the company in India.

== Background ==
The Monghyr Mutiny, which took place in 1766, was a mass resignation of white officers of the East India Company's Bengal Army, over the withdrawal of the batta allowance. The mutiny was quelled without bloodshed by Robert Clive, who was then Governor of Bengal, with a few loyal officers and a number of Indian sepoy troops. He is known to have commended the sepoys for their good behaviour and to have decorated a number of their officers and non-commissioned officers. The entire force also received two-months double pay.

== Medal ==
A Monghyr Mutiny campaign medal is listed in Steward (1915) as having been awarded by the East India Company in 1766. The National Army Museum holds a silver medal that it states is "believed to have been issued on the recommendation of Robert, Lord Clive, to the Indian officers of two Indian battalions who succeeded in quelling a mutiny among the European troops at Monghyr in Bengal, in June 1766". The Victoria and Albert Museum also holds one of these medals and describes it as having been given as a reward for service during the "batta disputes". It notes the medal is silvered by electrotyping and that the obverse shows Minerva, Roman goddess of wisdom, seated by some palm trees. The reverse shows laurel branches, the Latin inscription "non nisi digno" (only for the worthy) and the year "MDCCLXVI" (1766). The means of wearing the medal are not known but other early medals of the East India Company were worn suspended around the neck by means of a yellow cord.

Chakravorty (1995) states that this was the "earliest medal issued by the Company on the Indian soil", while Clark (2016) notes that it was only awarded to Indian soldiers. The next known medal issued by the company is the Deccan Medal awarded in 1784.

However, doubts have been raised with regards to this medal. The Freemasons' Quarterly Review of 1846 lists a medal struck by the Minerva zu den drei Palmen (Minerva with the three palms) lodge of Leipzig. This medal had "Minerva sitting under three palms" on the obverse and the same wreathed date and motto as the museum examples on the reverse. The British Numismatic Society identified the medal as that of the Minerva Lodge of the Freemasons in 1927. The United Service Institution of India noted in 1929 that the motto and depiction of Minerva make the medal better suited to a non-military application and that it "may be discarded as a military decoration". They also noted that it does not resemble any other medal ever issued by the East India Company and is not mentioned in its official records.

== Bibliography ==
- Chakravorty, B. (1995). Stories of Heroism: PVC & MVC Winners. Allied Publishers. ISBN 978-81-7023-516-3.
- Clark, Samuel (2016). Distributing Status: The Evolution of State Honours in Western Europe. McGill-Queen's Press - MQUP. ISBN 978-0-7735-9857-7.
- Das, Chand N. (1984). Traditions and Customs of the Indian Armed Forces. Vision Books.
- The Freemasons' Quarterly Review (1846). The Freemason's Lexicon. Sherwood, Gilbert, and Piper, Paternoster-Row.
- British Numismatic Society (1927). British Numismatic Journal.
- Steward, W. Augustus (1915). War Medals and Their History (Google Books). London: Stanley Paul and Company. pp. 9–17. ISBN 978-1-4086-9712-2. OCLC 459070961.
- Strachey, Sir Henry (1773). Narrative of the Mutiny of the Officers of the Army in Bengal, in the Year 1766. Becket.
- United Service Institution of India (1929). Journal of the United Service Institution of India.
