= New Patna Club =

- Formation: June 26, 1918; 108 years ago
- Headquarters: Beer Chand Patel Path
- Location: Patna, Bihar
- Services: Club

New Patna Club is a social club in Patna and is one of the oldest clubs of Bihar. It was founded in 1918 during the British Raj. The club is located on Beerchand Patel Path.

== History ==
The club was founded in 1918 by Justice F.R. Roe. He was assisted in its founding by Sir Ali Imam, Justice P.R. Das and Mr. Saiyid Sultan Ahmed. The Bihar and Orissa District Gazetteers Patna of 1924 reports that the club had a good building and had a member strength of eighty, both European and Indian. The club was established in the new capital of Patna at that time. Bankipore Club already existed in older part of Patna in Bankipore locality.

== Club Building ==
The club currently has two towers on its premises with several facilities for its members.

== Facilities ==
The club facilities include 4 tennis courts, a swimming pool and various rooms for indoor games such as carrom, billiards and cards among others. The club also provides its grounds for marriages and various events.

== Membership ==
The club currently has 800 permanent members, including 100 life members. About 750 people have taken service membership.

== Other facilities ==
The club also has guest rooms, gym, swimming pool, conference hall for about 250 people and 14 rooms for affiliated club members. There is parking facility for about 215 cars on club's premises.

== See also ==
- List of India's gentlemen's clubs
- Bankipore Club
