= White mutiny =

1850s mutiny of the East India Company's European troops

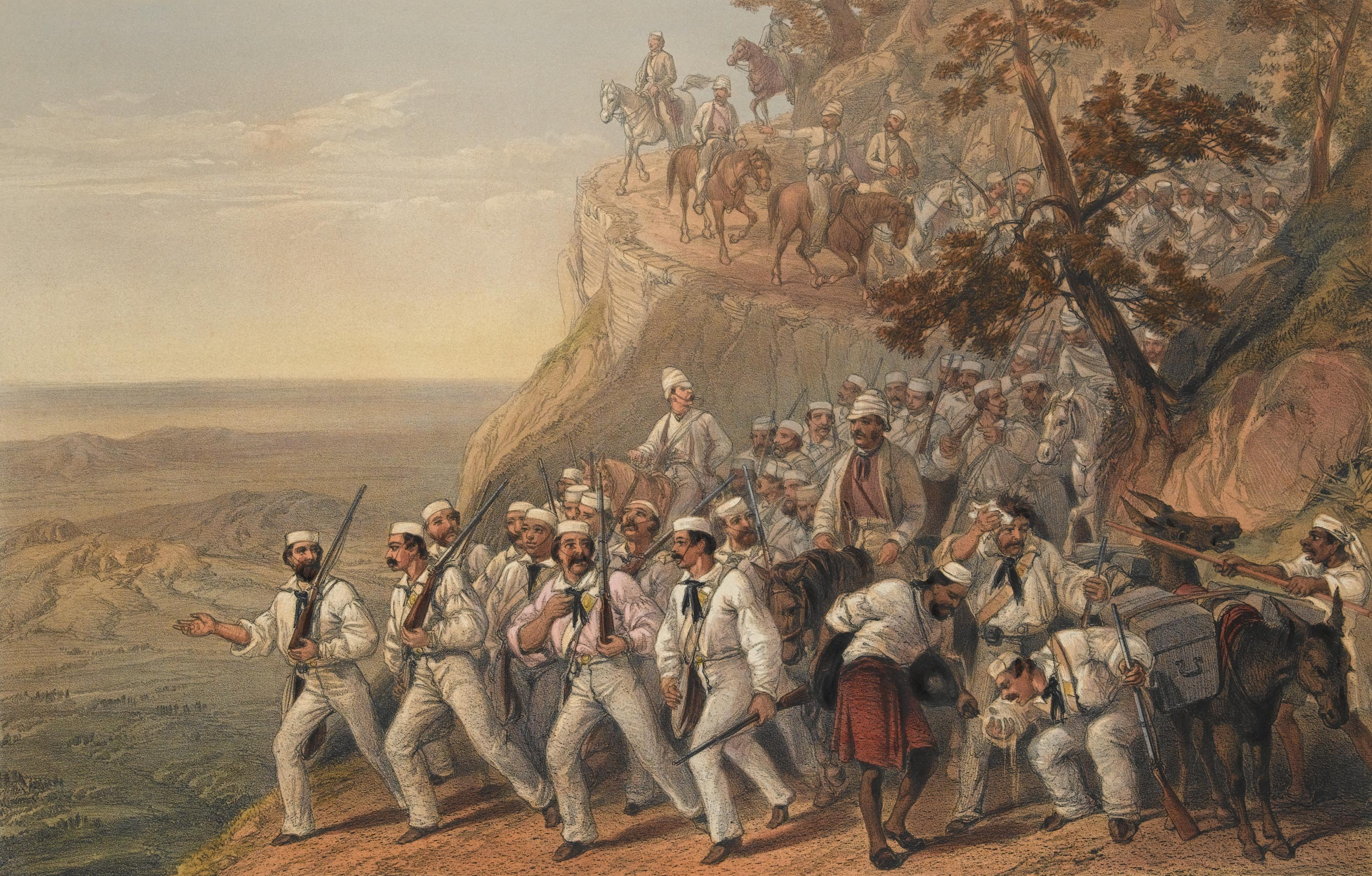
The 1st Bengal European Fusiliers in 1857

The White mutiny was a mutiny among the European regiments of the East India Company's Presidency armies as they were integrated into the British Army between 1858 and 1859. Occurring in the aftermath of the Indian Rebellion of 1857, the mutiny started due to concerns by the regiment's troops over their integration into the British army. It was quickly and bloodlessly suppressed by British colonial authorities.

== Background ==
Until 1861, there were two separate British ground forces in India: the British Army, under the control of the Crown, and the Presidency armies of the East India Company (EIC), consisting of the Bombay, Bengal and Madras armies. The British army in India consisted of various units who were sent to South Asia to serve tours of duty, while the Presidency armies primarily consisted of Indian troops under white officers who were stationed full-time in the Indian subcontinent. The EIC also maintained several European regiments consisting solely of white troops. Unlike the British Army, where officers purchased their commissions, the officer corps of the EIC's European regiments attained their ranks by seniority. In both forces, promotion could be accelerated by losses or transfers on active service.

EIC troops had traditionally received batta, extra monetary allowances to cover various expenditures relating to operations out of the home territories, which British Army troops did not. However, British army officers were considered senior to those of the same rank in the Presidency armies. The dissimilarities in the ethnic makeup between two forces led to many cultural differences in how they operated and viewed each other. These cultural differences often led to deep misunderstandings between the two forces. In 1858, the Parliament of the United Kingdom passed the Government of India Act 1858, transferring European regiments of the East India Company into the British Army.

== Mutiny ==
In the negotiations of the terms for the transfer there were several issues. One was that the Governor General of India Charles Canning did not give the European regiments notice of their transfer to the British army. Another was a result of Canning's legalistic interpretation of the laws surrounding the transfer. A third was in the misunderstanding that stemmed from cultural differences between the two forces. This was aggravated by influential articles printed by British periodicals of the time that wrongly painted the European regiments as undisciplined, unhealthy and mutinous in nature. The laws were quite clear and the legality of the transfer was well established, but because British authorities in both Britain and India ignored the views of those it was to affect, the officers and men of the European regiments were alienated to the point of open mutiny. Aggravating the condition was the still unsettled Indian Rebellion of 1857. The mutiny was seen as a potential undermining of the already rocky British rule in India with a potential of inciting renewed rebellion among the "still excited population throughout India".

Soldiers of the 1st Bengal European Light Cavalry performed "only guard and barrack duties" and "refused to turn out for parade, and mutinous language was used." The mutiny was highly successful in meeting its aims. The demands of the European regiments were centralised around demands for either an enlistment bonus for joining the British army or being given a military discharge. In this aim they were highly successful, achieving a promise of free and clear release with free passage home. Events that had occurred at some of the installations, including open rebellion and physical violence both on the part of the men and the officers of the European regiments, were such that there was little possibility of the regiments being successfully integrated into the British Army. Ultimately 10,116 officers and soldiers opted to return home to Britain, of whom only 2,809 re-enlisted in the British army.

== In popular culture ==
- In Robert A. Heinlein's novel The Number of the Beast, a form of nonviolent protest consisting of exact and literal obedience to instructions is referred to as a "White Mutiny".
- It is used in that sense in Patrick Rothfuss's novel The Name of the Wind (p. 593, New York: DAW Books, 2008 paperback).
- A synonym for "malicious compliance"
