= Bankipore Club =

Social club in Bankipore, India

- Formation: 1865; 161 years ago
- Headquarters: Bankipore
- Location: Patna, Bihar
- Services: Club

Bankipore Club is a social club in Patna and is one of the oldest clubs of India and second oldest in East India after Calcutta Rowing Club. It was founded in 1865 during the British Raj. The club is located in Bankipore neighbourhood of Patna.

== History ==
The club was founded in 1865 on the banks of river Ganges in Bankipore area of Patna. J.P.W.Johnstion was the founder secretary of the club. The club was originally known as the European Club and was used exclusively by Europeans. It was renamed Bankipore Club later, as Bankipore was the civil station of Patna District.

The club has hosted renowned personalities like cricketer W G Grace and Sir Edmund Hillary. Hillary preferred to stay at the club when he undertook a rowing expedition across the Ganges.

== Club Building ==
The main building of the club houses the reception, lobby and offices. And

== Facilities ==
The club facilities include a health club, gymnasium and a swimming pool. Club also has facilities such as squash, billiards and pool tables for its members. It also has a multi-cuisine restaurant and four suites for the guests. The club also provides its grounds for marriages and various events.

== Membership ==
The club currently has 600 permanent members and 1500 service members.

== Other facilities ==
The club also has conference hall for affiliated club members. There is parking facility for guests' cars on club's premises.

== In popular culture ==
E M Forster in his popular novel A Passage to India gave shadow reference to Bankipore Club as Chandrapore Club.

== See also ==
- List of India's gentlemen's clubs
- New Patna Club
