= Secunderabad Club =

Coordinates: 17.45265°N 78.49780°E

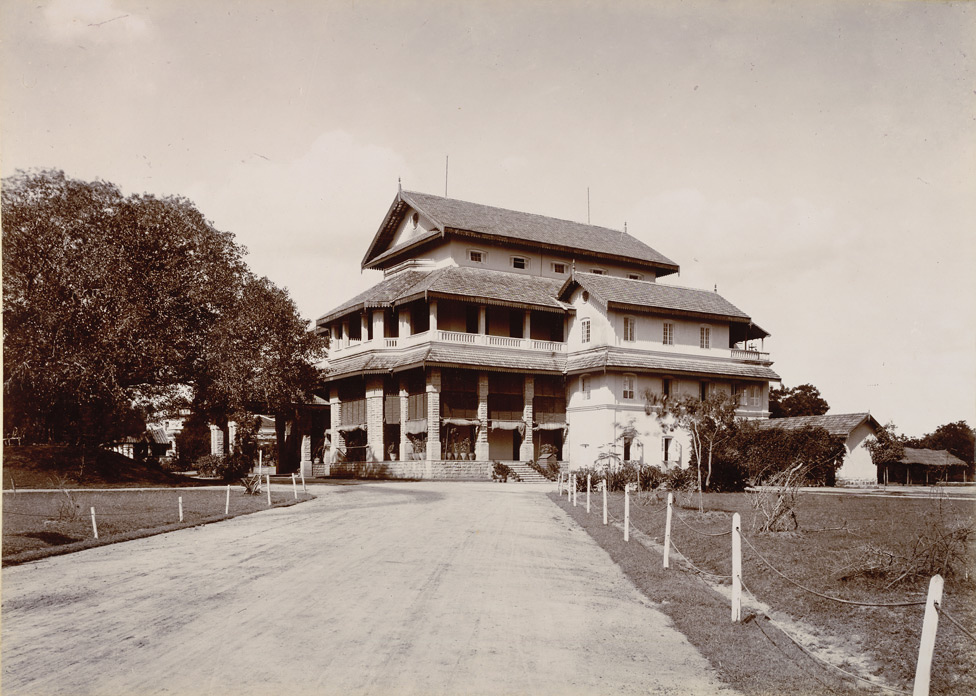
Secunderabad Club c. 1902

The Secunderabad Club located in Secunderabad is one of the five oldest clubs in India, the oldest club being the Bengal Club of Calcutta. The club was established on 26 April 1878 and was originally known as the Secunderabad Public Rooms. The club was earlier located somewhere near where Tivoli cinema is located today. The building where the club is located today was a hunting lodge gifted by Salar Jung. In 1888 it was renamed as the United Services Club and in 1903 it was subsequently renamed as Secunderabad Club. It shared its membership with many freemasons of the nearby The St. John's (Secunderabad). The Main Club house was given a heritage status in 2017.

The earliest records state that this Club was formed by the British Army Garrisons that were stationed in Secunderabad under an agreement with the 3rd Nizam - Sikandar Jah. The club was earlier known as Secunderabad Garrison Club, the Secunderabad Gymkhana Club, and the United Services Club. The club moved to its current location in March 1903.

During the late 19th century, the name of Garrison Club was changed to United Services Club representing the membership from all parts of the services. The Club was no longer an army club and it served all the services represented by the British.

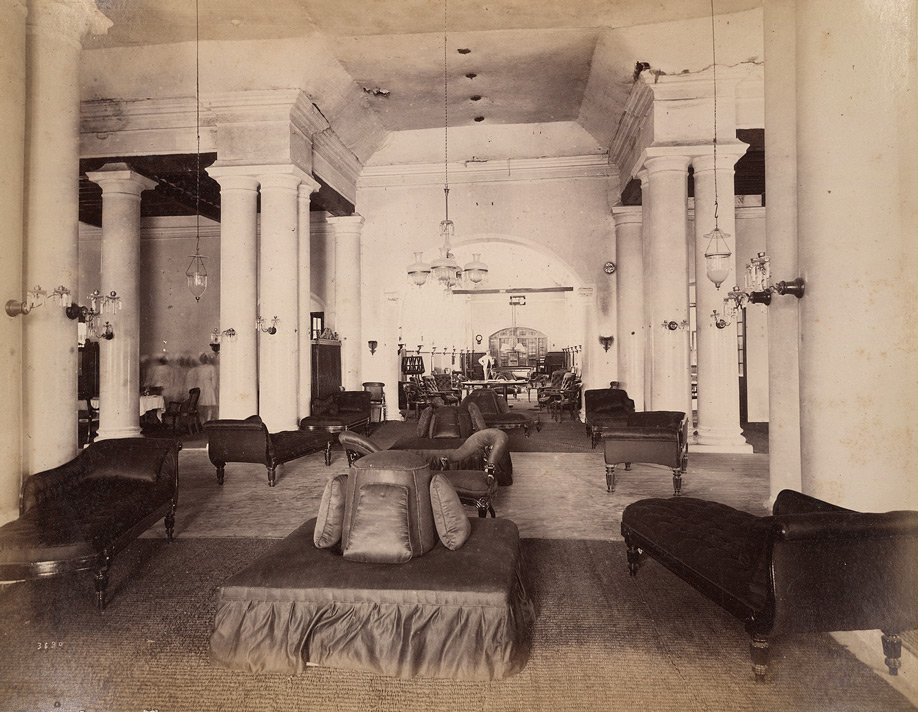
View of club interiors in 1890

Until 1947, the club only Britishers were allowed to be its president and a few high-ranking nobility from Hyderabad were offered membership.

The first Indian who became the president of the club was Major General El Edross who was the commander-in-chief of the Hyderabad State Forces. After Hyderabad State joined Indian Union in September 1948, General Choudary who was then the Military Governor of Hyderabad State, became the President for a few months. Later Mirza Najaf Alikhan an ICS Officer was elected as the President of the Club in 1948.

The club used to have a Golf course at Bolarum and a Sailing Club as annexes to the Main Club which was nearly 21 acres (85,000 m^{2}) in area. The Golf Club was eventually taken over by the Indian Army in 1983 after the expiry of the lease period. The Sailing Annexe is located at Hussain Sagar lake and is one of the oldest sailing clubs in India. The Hyderabad Sailing Week is organised every July.

In the early hours of the 15th of January, 2022, a massive fire completely gutted the 144-year-old historic main building.

The club's Colonnade Bar, billiards room and the administration office are among the structures that were destroyed in the fire.

The fire is believed to have started in the barroom between 12 and 1 am, and by 3 am, when seven fire tenders were rushed the entire building was on fire. Initial attempts by some club staff to put out the fire did not help with the liquor stores of the club also catching fire.

== See also ==
- List of India's gentlemen's clubs
