= Nizam Club =

- Formation: 1884; 142 years ago
- Type: gentlemen's club
- Location: Hyderabad, Telangana, India
- Website: www.nizamclub.com

The Nizam Club is located in Saifabad, Hyderabad, India. The club location is considered as heart of the Hyderabad city, which is exactly opposite to Telangana Legislative Assembly Hall. Surrounded in 4 acres land.

== History ==
The club was established on 26 September 1884 by Nawab Mahbub Ali Khan, Asaf Jah VI. During those days, there was only one major club in the Hyderabad State, the Secunderabad Club and it was exclusive and almost confined to the British Resident of Hyderabad State. Therefore, The then Prime Minister of Hyderabad State - Mir Laiq Ali Khan Salar Jung II, suggested a club for gentlemen of status and culture, irrespective of race, religion or creed, be established. And the Nizam Club came into existence.

In 1885, Mahbub Ali Khan, Asaf Jah VI sanctioned a monthly grant of Rs 100 towards rent for a suitable club building and this grant was continued till 1946.

The club was initially housed at the Abid Centre (now Abids), on a site where the old General Post Office building was subsequently located. Later, it was shifted to premises in the present Mahboobia Girls School complex.

The present premises was purchased in 1906 for a sum of Rs 30,000, located opposite to the Telangana Legislative Assembly building

== Management ==
The first president of the club was Salar Jung II, who continued till 1887. Since then, 24 persons served as presidents of the Nizam Club.

== Structure ==
The sprawling club, spread across 4 acres of land, European in style, the central structure has a stone portico with steps leading up to the raised plinth. An arched corridor spans the entire facade and wraps around to the southern portion. A beautiful wooden staircase leads up to the upper floor. Various additions and alterations have been made to the original structure. The club records attribute the construction of a magnificent Banquet Gakk ub 1910 to Nawab Hakim ud Dowla and the creation of the Card Room designed and constructed in 1945.

== Facilities ==
Serving with the fleet of 300 staff, the Nizam Club is one of the prominent clubs in Hyderabad.

- Library: The Club library was started in the year 1884 AD, for the use of its members. Even though it started with limited number of books, it has now grown to an extent of approximately 4000 books consisting of Fiction, Non-Fiction, Children's, Encyclopedia, History, Technical and literature of all languages. Nawab Nazir Yar Jung was the founder Secretary to the Library.
- Health Club: A well-equipped Gym and fitness centre for ladies with physiotherapy facilities are provided for Club members. It is popularly known as one of the best Health Club centres in the twin cities.
- Shuttle court: Two indoor shuttle courts with wooden flooring are provided for the members. The club conducts interclub annual tournaments.
- Swimming Pool: It has two full-sized swimming pools, one of which is for children under 14.
- Tennis court: Two sand tennis courts, available for members' use, are equipped with floodlights. The club is proud to say that Ms. Sania Mirza, the Wimbledon girls' doubles title winner and the first Indian woman to win a Grand Slam title, had started learning tennis from this court.
- Billiards: The Club maintains a billiards section, with three tables. An Inter-Club Snooker and Billiards tournament is conducted by the club every year.
- Cards Section: The club runs a 24 hour cards section. The game of cards is played based on skills of the player. The club conducts prestigious open bridge tournaments and rummy competitions and whist drives every year.
- Restaurant: existing dining hall (Dine 'n' Drink) and Banquet Gakk ub, is very popular for mutton biryani, which has been famous from the days of Nizam's Mughal chefs. The management also provides special entertainment zones for children.

== Awards ==
INTACH awarded and Listed in the city's heritage for being a landmark, for its conscious restoration and preservation effort.

== Restoration ==
Having intrinsic architectural value, the Nizam Club had been in a state of disrepair and neglect for quite some time. There is now a positive change in the building's upkeep. Sensitive restoration has been carried out to organize the utilities. The electrical fixtures are now in harmony and along with the restored furniture, have brought back the authentic heritage feel to the environment. The repairs and maintenance have been undertaken in original materials and a number of interventions reversed to restore the authentic lines and proportions.

== See also ==
- List of India's gentlemen's clubs
- History of Hyderabad Deccan
