= Bankipore =

Bankipore Bankipur
- Neighbourhood
- Location in Patna, India
- Coordinates: 25°36′42.04″N 85°7′44.86″E
- Country: India
- State: Bihar
- City: Patna

Languages
  - Spoken: Hindi, English
- Time zone: UTC+5:30 (IST)
- PIN: 800004
- Vehicle registration: BR-01
- Planning agency: Patna Metropolitan Area Authority
- Civic agency: Patna Municipal Corporation

Bankipur (Hindi: बाँकीपुर) (also spelt Bankipur) is a historic neighbourhood in central Patna, Bihar, India. Situated on the southern bank of the Ganges, it developed during the British colonial period as the administrative and institutional centre of the state. From the late eighteenth century until the early twentieth century, Bankipore emerged as the principal centre of modern Patna, while the older city remained centred around present-day Patna City (formerly Azimabad). The neighbourhood forms part of the Bankipur Assembly constituency, one of the six assembly segments of the Patna Sahib Lok Sabha constituency. It is home to the Khuda Bakhsh Oriental Library, Golghar, Bankipore Club, and several educational and public institutions.

== Etymology ==
According to local tradition, Bankipore is named after Mir Baqi (also known as Banki), a military commander who is said to have campaigned in Bengal and Bihar during the fifteenth century. The name Bankipore (or Bankipur) has been in use since the eighteenth century. During British rule, the locality developed as the civil station of Patna and subsequently emerged as the administrative centre of Bihar.

== History ==
Following the Treaty of Allahabad (1765), the East India Company acquired the Diwani (revenue-collection rights) of Bengal, Bihar and Orissa. Bankipore lies along an east–west axis on the south bank of the Ganges, some four kilometers west from the medieval Patna City, or Azimabad.

A house in Bankipore in 1804

The site is almost certainly the location of the ancient Magadhan and Maurya capital of Pataliputra. Its identification with Pataliputra was first noticed by Sir William Jones who was informed that Bankipore lay on the former confluence of the River Sone with the Ganges, a site that has shifted some distance upstream now-and one that matches Megasthenes' description.

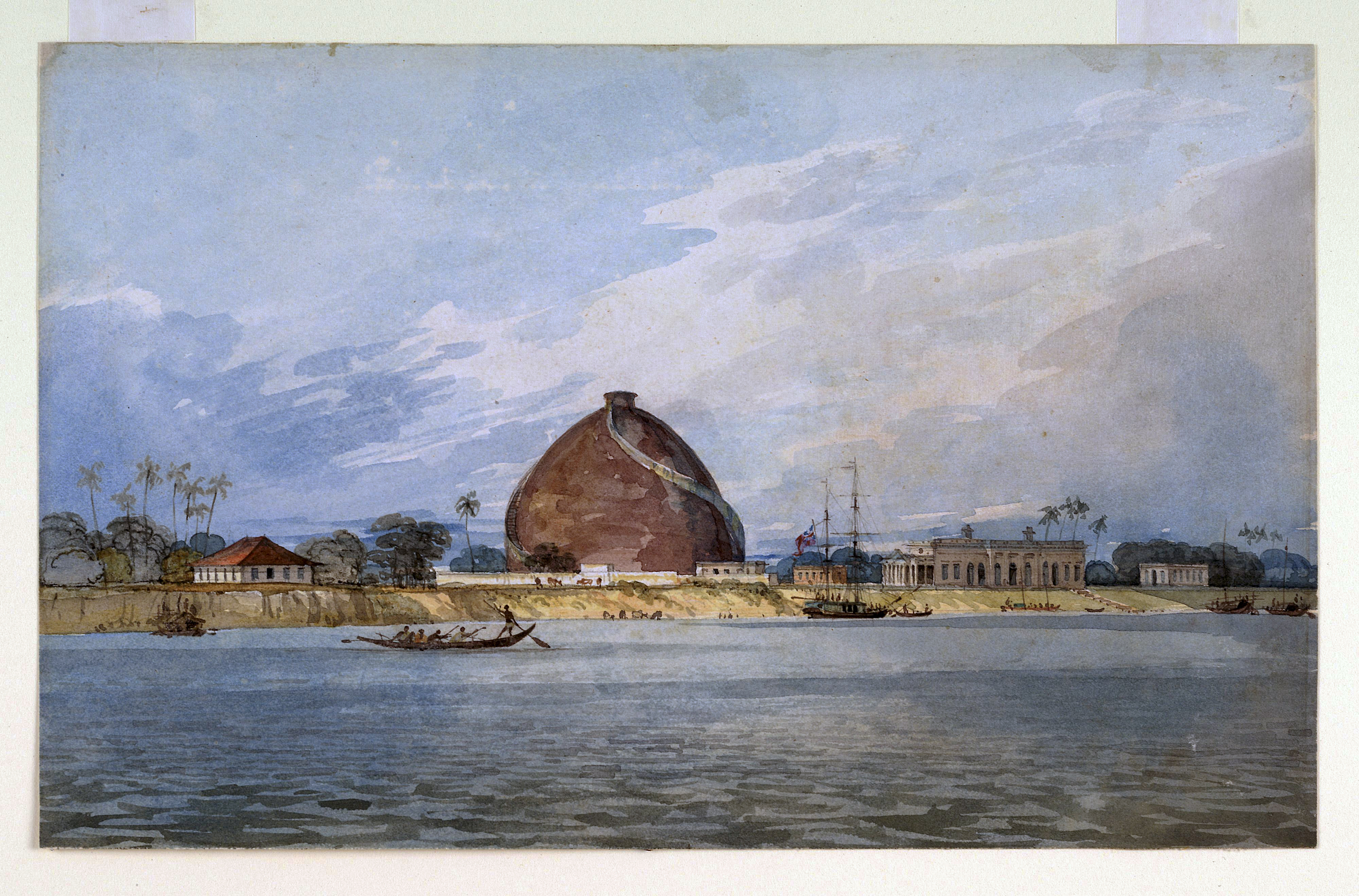
Golghar at Bankipur, painted by Robert Smith, a British military engineer, architect and artist, in 1814-15

Although the historic city of Patna (Azimabad) remained the commercial centre of the region, the Company established its civil station at Bankipore, west of the old city, where new government offices and residences for British officials were constructed. Among the earliest landmarks of colonial Bankipore was Golghar, built between 1784 and 1786 under the supervision of Captain John Garstin on the orders of Governor-General Warren Hastings following the Great Bengal famine of 1770. The structure became one of the earliest public works associated with the development of Bankipore. Over the following decades, Bankipore emerged as the administrative centre of Patna and later of Bihar. Major public institutions, including the Commissioner's office, District Magistrate's office, courts and educational institutions, were established in the locality. Following the creation of the Province of Bihar and Orissa in 1912, Bankipore became the principal seat of the provincial administration, and institutions such as the Patna Secretariat and Patna High Court reinforced its administrative importance. The historical extent of Bankipore was considerably larger than that of the present-day neighbourhood. It included areas now occupied by the Patna Secretariat, Patna Junction and adjoining localities. This legacy survives in institutions and place names such as Bankipur Central Jail, Bankipore Club, and Bankipore Junction, the original name of the present-day Patna Junction railway station. Likewise, Gandhi Maidan was formerly known as Bankipore Maidan before being renamed in honour of Mahatma Gandhi after his assassination in 1948.

Golghar in 2018

Among the principal remains of the colonial period in Bankipore are the District Collectorate, the Civil Court, and mansions such as the impressive Darbhanga House (now the PG Deptt. Patna University), built in the late 19th century by the great philanthropist, the Maharaja of Darbhanga, Lakshmeshwar Singh. The Bankipore cemetery, which has the graves of minor Company officials and indigo planters, the Khuda Bakhsh Oriental Library, founded by Khan Bahadur Khuda Bakhsh in 1891, and the Catholic Mission, are among the other historic sites of Bankipore. Bankipore is also notable for its several ghats, which include the old Jahaz Ghat, from where plied the daily ferry across the river, and the Darbhanga Ghat. One of the earliest educational institutions of the erstwhile Bengal Presidency, Rammohun Roy Seminary, a High English School, was set up at Bankipur in 1892 under the charge of Satis Chandra Chakravarti, a worker of the Bankipur Ashram of the Sadharan Brahmo Samaj. Bankipore also played an important role in India's freedom movement. The 27th session of the Indian National Congress, under the Presidency of Rao Bahadur Raghunath Narasinha Mudholkar from Amravati of Central Provinces and Berar, the first to be held in Bihar, was held at Bankipore in 1912. Among the delegates was Jawaharlal Nehru, then 23 years old and recently returned from England. During his first visit to Bihar in 1917, Mahatma Gandhi arrived at Bankipore Railway Station before proceeding to Champaran at the invitation of Raj Kumar Shukla.

== Geography ==
Bankipore is situated on the southern bank of the Ganges in central Patna. Historically, the locality occupied a considerably larger area than at present, extending across much of what is now the administrative and institutional centre of the city. The present-day neighbourhood represents only part of the historical Bankipore of the colonial period.

== Government and administration ==
Bankipore is administered by the Patna Municipal Corporation. The entire neighbourhood falls within the Bankipur Circle of the corporation. It forms part of the Bankipur Assembly constituency, one of the six assembly segments of the Patna Sahib Lok Sabha constituency.

The locality is served by the Bankipur Head Post Office and falls within the jurisdictions of the Gandhi Maidan and Pirbahore police stations.

== Education ==
Bankipore has long been one of Patna's principal educational centres. Educational institutions in the neighbourhood include:

- Patna University – One of the oldest universities in eastern India, established in 1917.
- Patna College – Founded in 1863, among the oldest institutions of higher education in Bihar.
- B. N. College – A constituent college of Patna University, established in 1889.
- Patna Science College – A science college established in 1927 and affiliated with Patna University.
- Patna Law College – Established in 1909, among the oldest law colleges in Bihar.
- Patna Women's College – Founded in 1940, among the oldest women's colleges in the state.
- Patna Dental College and Hospital – One of India's oldest dental colleges and teaching hospitals.
- Patna Training College – Established in 1908, among Bihar's oldest teacher-training institutions.
- St. Joseph's Convent High School, Patna – Established in 1853, among the oldest English-medium schools in Bihar. It was originally established to educate European and Eurasian girls before later opening to other students.
- Bankipore Government Girls' High School – Founded in 1892 by Aghor Kamini Ray, it is among the oldest girls' schools in Bihar and has played an important role in women's education in the state. It became a government institution in 1914.

== Economy ==
Government offices, courts, educational institutions and public establishments constitute a significant part of the neighbourhood's economy. Commercial activity in Bankipore is largely centred on the services supporting these institutions.

== Culture ==
Bankipore hosts numerous public, cultural and religious events throughout the year. Gandhi Maidan serves as one of Patna's principal venues for public meetings, exhibitions, book fairs and cultural programmes.

The neighbourhood is also home to the Bankipore Club, established in 1865, which is among the oldest surviving clubs in eastern India.

Several ghats along the Ganges in and around Bankipore are important venues for Chhath Puja.

== Transport ==
Bankipore is connected to other parts of Patna by Ashok Rajpath, Bailey Road, Buddha Marg and adjoining arterial roads.

The present-day Patna Junction was originally established as Bankipore Junction, reflecting the historical importance of the locality. Under the Patna Metro project, the proposed Gandhi Maidan metro station and PMCH metro stations are located within or immediately adjoining the neighbourhood.

The locality is served by city bus services, auto-rickshaws and taxis. Jay Prakash Narayan Airport is located approximately 7 km to the south-west.

== Landmarks ==
- Golghar
- Khuda Bakhsh Oriental Library
- Bankipore Club
- Gandhi Sangrahalaya, Patna
- Patna Civil Court
- Patna Collectorate

== In fiction ==
The author E. M. Forster states that the city of Chandrapore, in his novel A Passage to India (1924), "was suggested geographically by the town of Bankipore". The Marabar Hills of the novel corresponds to the Rajgir Hills, a few miles away from Patna and the site of ancient Buddhist-Mauryan remains.
