= Trichinopoly Club =

Erstwhile Europeans-only-club

Trichinopoly Club was a gentleman's club in the city of Tiruchirappalli in Tamil Nadu, India. It functioned from 1869 till 1972 when it closed down due to lack of patronage.

== History ==
The Trichinopoly Club, or Trichy Club, was founded in 1869 as a Europeans-only club. A gymkhana club was also founded in association with it. After flourishing in its early days, the club gradually began to run out of members. The numbers declined from about 50 in the early 1900s to 6 in 1955 and 3 in 1957. The decline was partly attributed to the club's policy to give membership only to Europeans. Eventually, H. C. Boas, the then President of the club, requested the Madras Club to bail it out. Down to one or two members, the club was closed down in 1972, three years after celebrating its centenary. Its assets were taken over by the Madras Club.
