= Hyderabad Sailing Week =

Annual yacht regatta in India

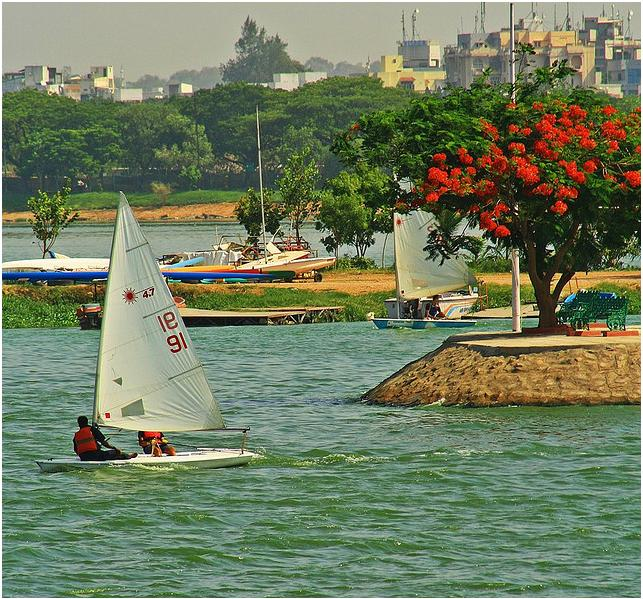
Optimist and Laser dinghies during the Hyderabad Sailing Week Regatta at Hussain Sagar

Hyderabad Sailing Week is an annual event of yacht regatta conducted at Hussain Sagar in Hyderabad, India. Founded in 1985 it is cited as country's top national regattas and the only Olympic class sports event in India.
