= Banerjee Memorial Club =

Banerji Memorial Club
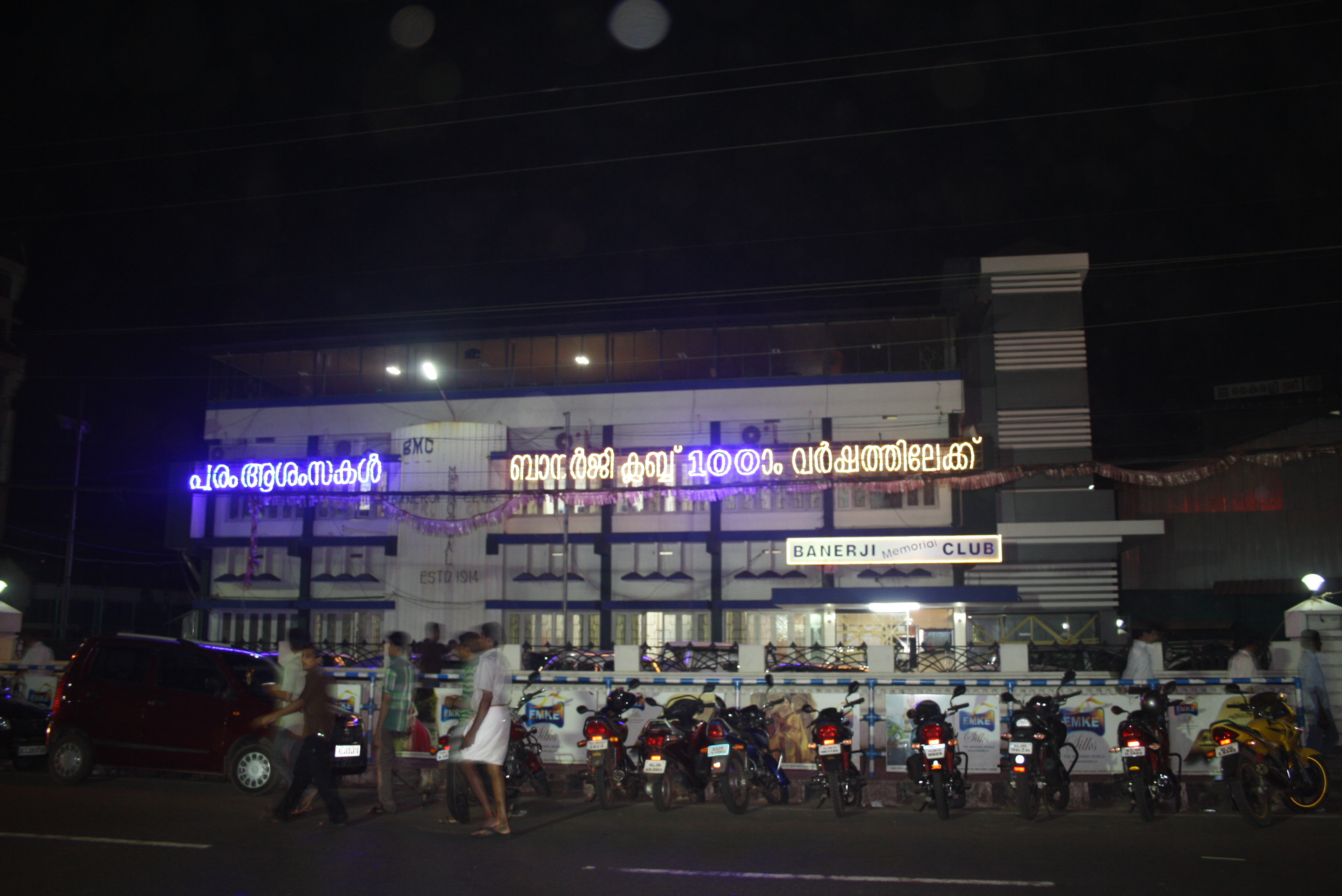
- Formation: 1914
- Type: Private club
- Location: India
- Official language: Malayalam, English
- Website: http://banerjiclub.com/

Banerji Memorial Club is a private social club situated in Thrissur city, Kerala state in India. It is the oldest club in Central Kerala.

== History ==
Located at the heart of the Swaraj Round, Thrissur, the club was founded in 1914. The club is named after Albion Rajkumar Banerji, Diwan of Cochin Kingdom who founded the club. The first President of the club was J. W. Bhore, Diwan of Cochin Kingdom. Rama Varma XV, the Maharaja of Cochin, was the first patron of the club.

The club is locked with a land dispute with Thrissur Municipal Corporation and Government of Kerala. The club sits in 51.625 cents of land. The club is mainly popular for organising corporate workshops, business conferences, training sessions, annual general meetings, product launches and exhibitions. The club has a bar, conference room, gymnasium, clubhouse, a billiards room, card rooms and a tennis court.
