= Patna Collectorate =

Government building in Bihar, India

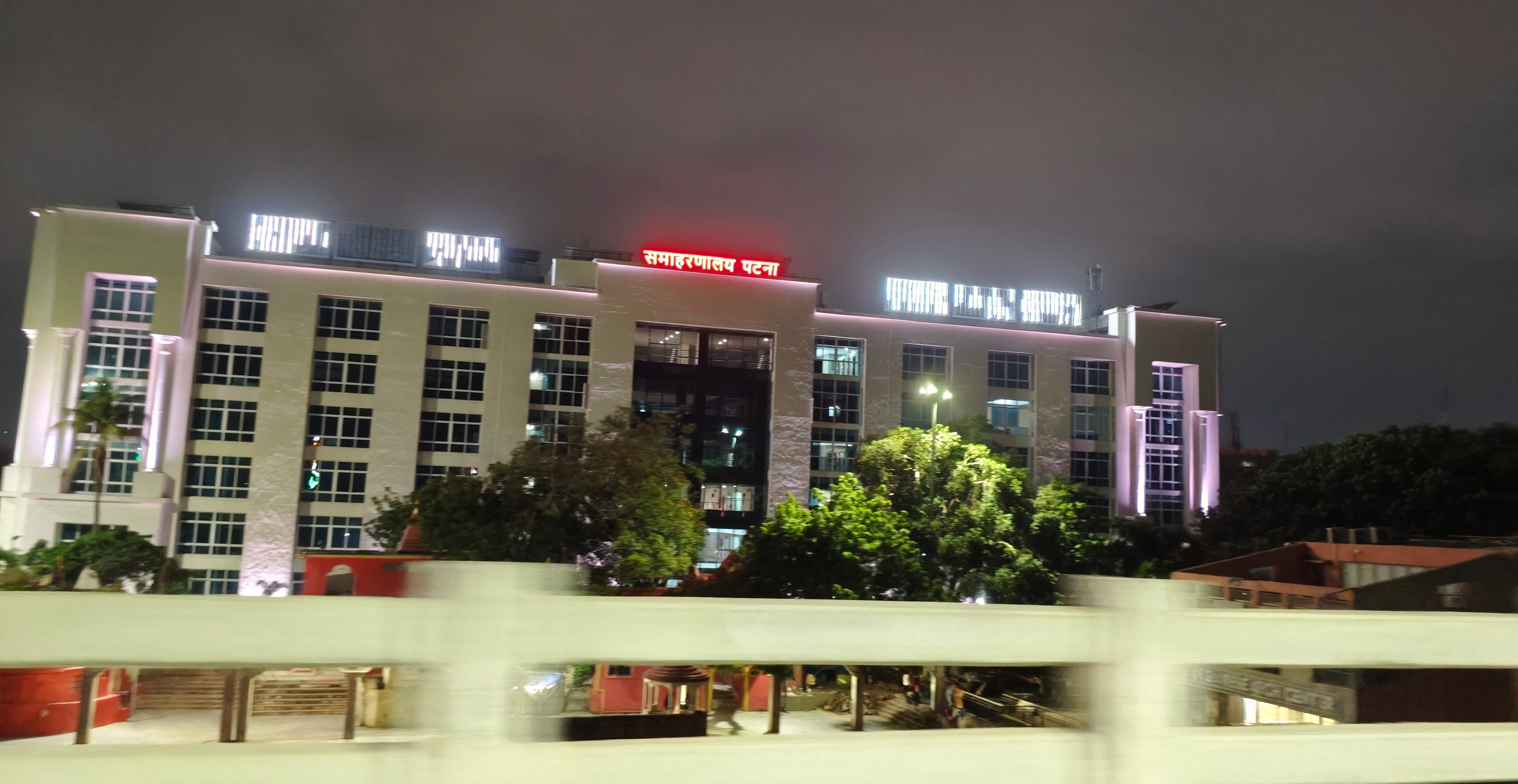

- Location within Patna
- Alternative names: Patna district Collector Office

General information
- Type: Government
- Architectural style: Dutch architecture & British architecture
- Location: Patna, Bihar, India
- Coordinates: 25°37′17″N 85°8′53″E
- Elevation: 58 m (190 ft)
- Current tenants: Chandrashekhar Singh, IAS, District magistrate of Patna
- Construction started: 1857
- Completed: 1867
- Inaugurated: 1938
- Owner: Government of Bihar

Website
- patna.nic.in

Patna Collectorate or Patna district Collector (District Collectorate, Patna) is administrative head office of Collector of Patna district in Patna, Bihar, India (district headquarters). It is on the bank of river Ganges, close to Gandhi Maidan. It is in the style of Dutch architecture and British architecture and is over 200-year-old building complex. In 2008, the Collectorate was listed as heritage building by the Government of Bihar. In 2016, the government proposed its demolition and replacement with a new office complex. The Indian Supreme Court dismissed petitions from the Indian National Trust for Art and Cultural Heritage, a heritage organisation, to stay the demolition in May 2022, and the complex began to be razed the following day.

== History ==
The Dutch first came to Patna in the early 17th century. The building was constructed by the Dutch East India Company and it was used as a godown during the Dutch period. During the British Raj, the British reused this building as Collectorate. The Collectorate started functioning from its present premises from 1857. In 1938, the District Board building was added, which is built in the British architecture.

In 2016, the Bihar government decided to dismantle the old buildings and replace them with a new complex. This led to widespread voiced protests and criticism by historians and different organisations, most notably; the New Delhi based Indian National Trust for Art and Cultural Heritage and the London based Gandhi Foundation. In April 2016, Ambassador of the Netherlands to India Alphonsus Stoelinga in a letter to Bihar Chief Minister Nitish Kumar appealed to spare Collectorate. Legal challenges to the demolition were dismissed by the Indian Supreme Court in May 2022, and by June, several parts of the complex, including the District Magistrate's office, were destroyed.

A 1920s-vintage coal-fired steamroller built by John Fowler & Company of Leeds and used to smoothen roads in India during British rule was discovered in one of the buildings of the Collectorate. After campaigns by locals, Patna Museum acquired it for display.

== Overview ==
The Collectorate is headed by the District collector (also called magistrates), an Indian Administrative Service (IAS) officer. Offices of The Additional District Magistrate & Deputy Collector (General), Deputy Collector (Land Acquisition), Deputy Collector (Revenue Recovery), Deputy Collector (Disaster Management), Deputy Collector (Election), Deputy Collector (Land Reforms) and office of the Senior Finance Officer are also functioning in Collectorate Building.
