= Bangalore Club =

Private members' club in Bangalore, India

Coordinates: 12°58′0.17″N 77°35′50.91″E

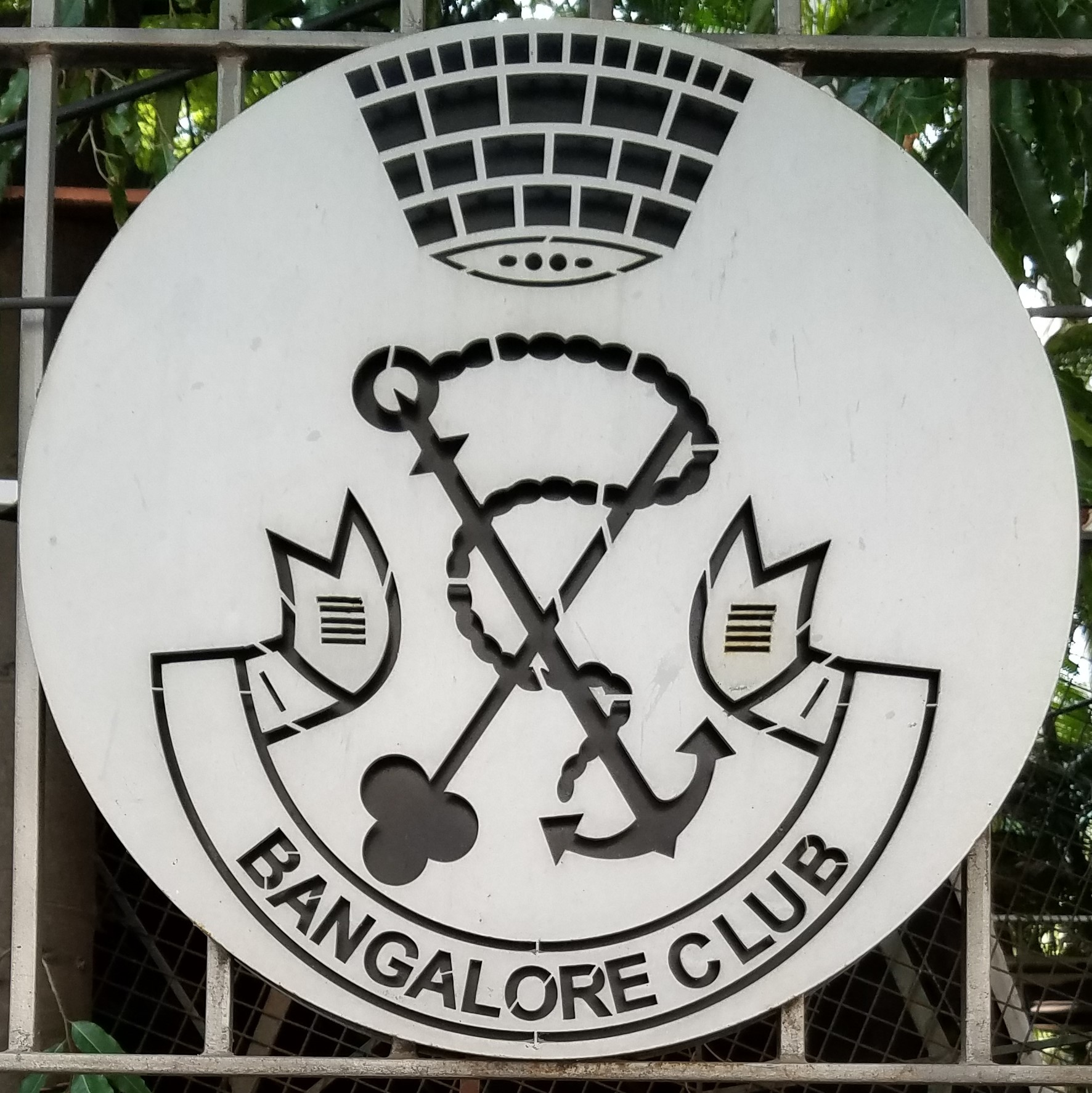
- Bangalore Club logo
- Formation: 1868; 158 years ago
- Type: gentlemen's club
- Location: Bangalore, Karnataka, India
- Website: www.bangaloreclub.com
- Formerly called: Bangalore United Services Club

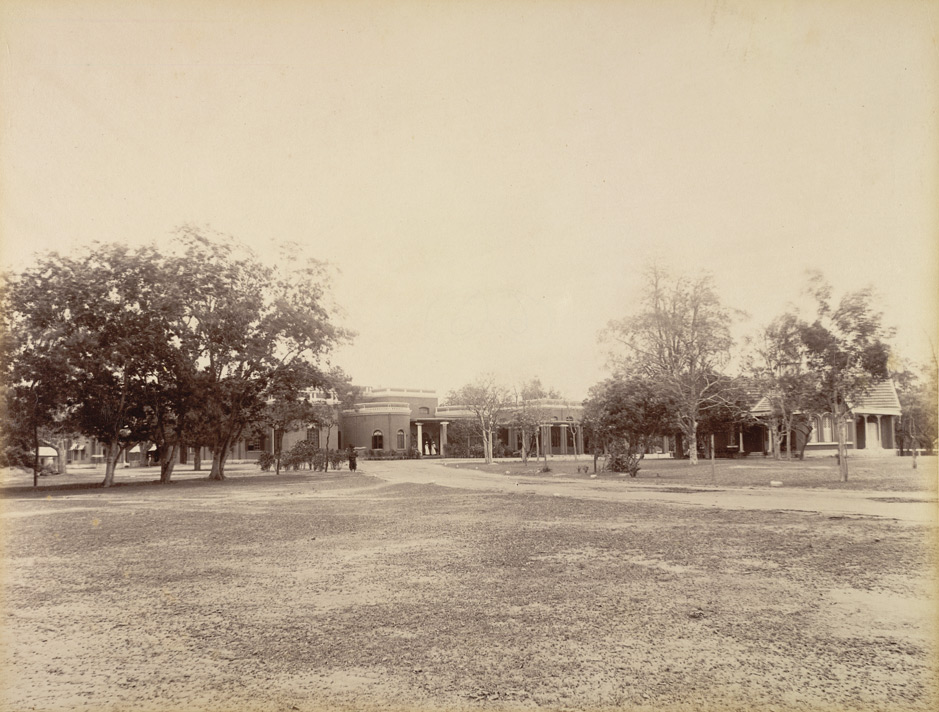
United Services Club, Bangalore, from the Macnabb Collection (Col James Henry Erskine Reid): Album of Indian views, taken in 1902

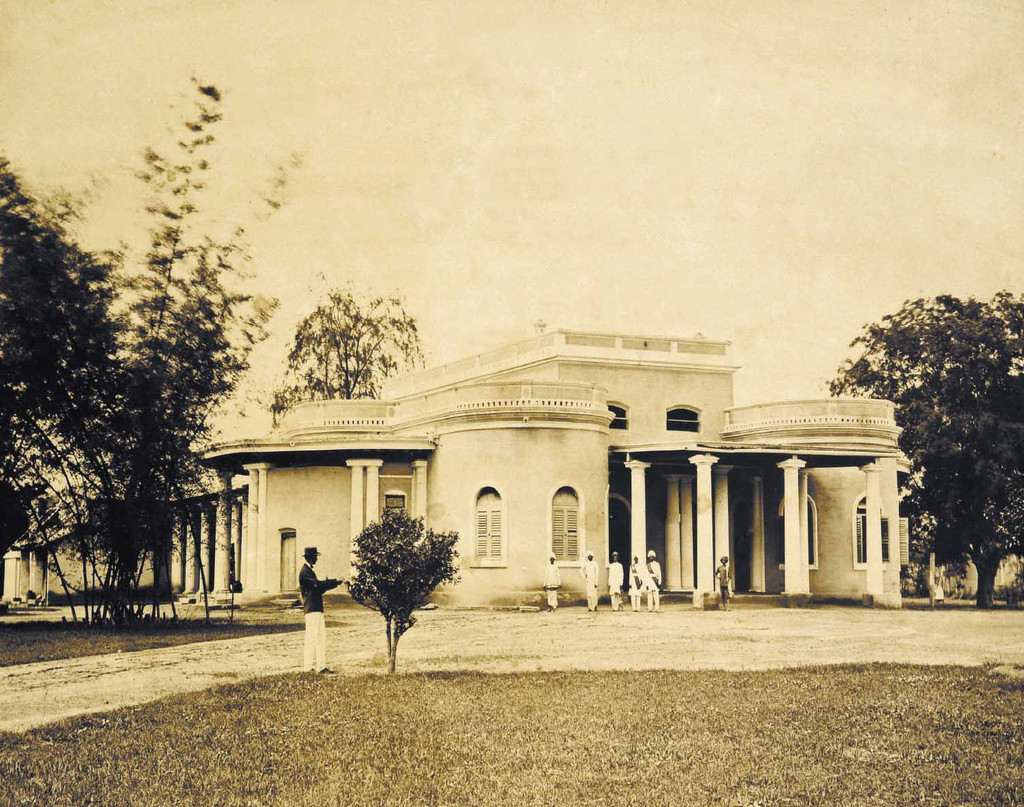
United Services Club at Bangalore (1883), founded by Albert Thomas Watson Penn (1849–1924.

The Bangalore Club, located in Bangalore, Karnataka, is the oldest club in the city. Founded in 1868, it counts among its previous members the Maharaja of Mysore and Winston Churchill. A ledger on display in the main building of the club is open to a page that has a list of "irrecoverable debts" that were written off by the club. One of these is the sum Rs. 13, owed by Winston Churchill. Membership at present for the category of new permanent members is closed, but last when open, had a waiting list of over 30 years. The club is spread across 11 acres and located on Cariappa Road, near Richmond Circle.

== History ==
The club was established in 1868, named the Bangalore United Services Club for officers of the British Empire. In 1915, membership was opened to Indian officers.

Membership for civilians was opened in 1946, and the club was renamed the Bangalore Club. In 2018, the Club celebrated completing 150 years of existence.

== Facilities ==
The club has a limited number of restaurants, bars, libraries, and sports facilities i.e.: Badminton, Squash, Billiards, Table tennis, Swimming pool, Tennis courts, Bridge, Gymnasium, etc., and is built in the colonial style. In addition to these, it also has some stores for the convenience of its members, open to only club members.

The club has many rules and regulations which could be more of an effect of a colonial hangover, but lately, there has been a concentrated effort to rectify the same. Members can also visit other affiliated clubs around India and many parts of the world. The club has tough dress regulations at several places which upholds the club's tradition at all times.

== See also ==
- List of gentlemen's clubs in India
