= Batta =

Type of employee allowance

In the British Raj, batta or bhatta or bat-ta was a banking term and a military term, meaning (i) an agio or disagio, (ii) a special allowance made to officers, soldiers, or other public servants in the field, and (iii) any additional or extra charge elsewhere. The term is probably derived from Kannada bhatta (rice in the husk).

Batta was originally introduced as a payment to military officers of the East India Company, in addition to their ordinary salary, to provide them with money for field-equipment and other expenses when on the march. By November 1842, a distinction was made according to which part of the country they were based. A lieutenant-colonel in barracks in southern India, for instance would receive half batta, 304 rupees (£30) a month. All cavalry and infantry officers stationed in northern India received full batta.

Discontent over changes to the allowance was the cause of the Monghyr Mutiny.

In Hindi, the term bhatta (Hindi भत्ता) is now used to refer to allowance made to military personnel or other public servants.

In Pakistan the term bhatta (Urdu بھتہ ) is now used specially in Karachi by MQM to take extortion money from common persons.
