= Madras Club =

Gentleman's club in India

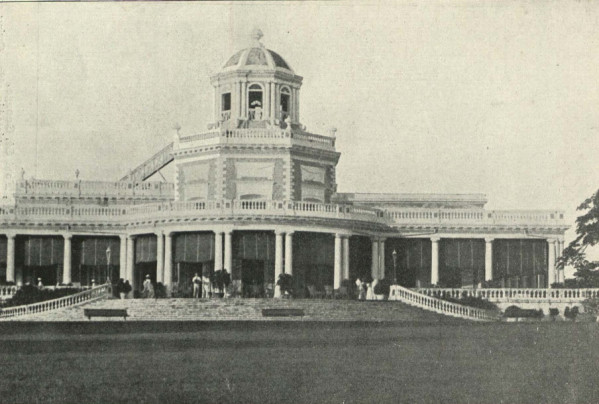
The Adyar Club, c. 1905

Madras Club, or Adyar Club, is a gentleman's club in the city of Chennai, India. Founded in 1832, it is the second oldest of its kind in India.

== History ==
The Madras Club was founded on 15 May 1832 as a European men-only club. Its first President was one H. Chamier. The Adyar Club was founded in 1890. In contrast to the Madras Club, the Adyar Club gave membership to women. Originally started as a Europeans-only club, the Adyar Club started admitting Indians as members in 1960. The two clubs merged in 1963 under the name "Madras Club". Since the merger, the Madras Club has been admitting Indians as its members.

The Civilian's South India, in its 1921 issue, considered the Madras Club to be the best of its kind in the country

Madras being the Headquarter of Headquarters, the Madras Club is naturally the Ace of Clubs. It is said to be the best Club in India, and the Civilian can well believe that it is; you can lose yourself in it three or four times running, and parts of it are still believed by some to be unexplored. The Civilian thinks it is the only Club in the Presidency which is a convenience and not an institution or a duty; and that is only because it is so large that nobody knows or cares whether you are there or not

— Civilian's South India, pp 51-52, 1921.

== Headquarters ==
The Express Estate, which now houses the Express Avenue shopping mall, was till 1947, the original home of the Madras Club. The club moved to Adyar in 1963 and is still based there.

The main building with the dome built in 1890 hosts a bar, formal dining hall and outside casual dining area called Verandah, overlooking the lawns and Adayar river. Sports facilities and a swimming pool along with a poolside cafe are in the same campus. Reciprocal club members can avail the heritage chambers for staying when they visit Chennai.

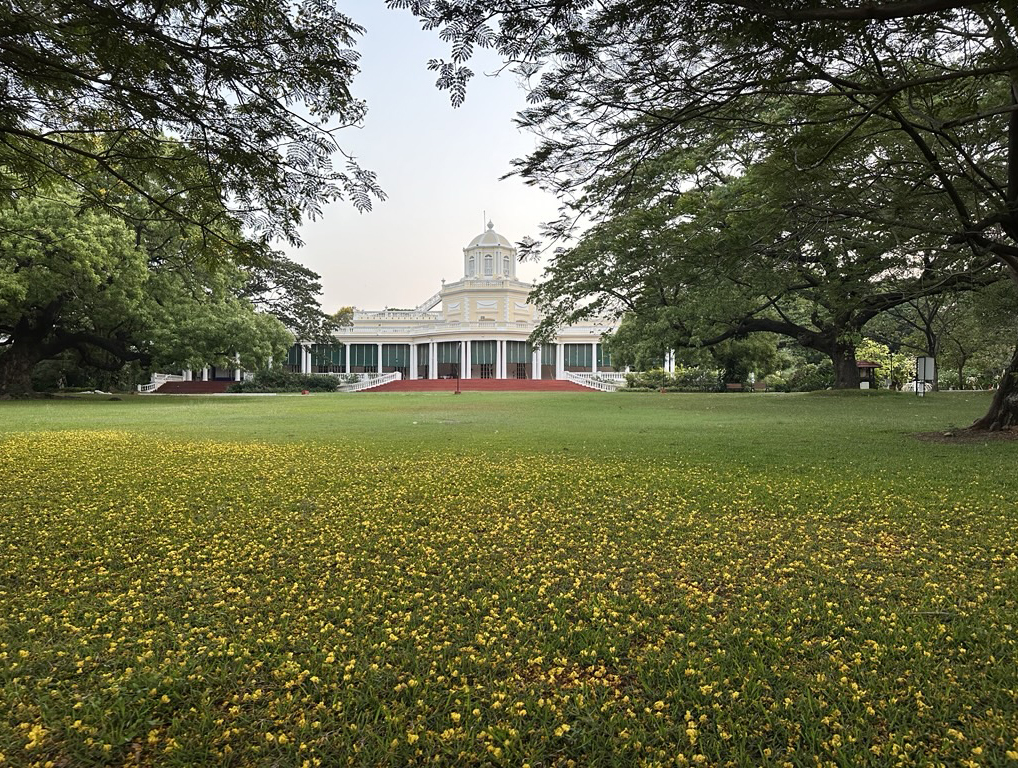
Madras Club main building and lawn from Adayar river, April 2026
