= Patna Training College =

College in Bihar

- Type: Public
- Established: 1908
- Chancellor: Shri Fagu Chauhan
- Vice-Chancellor: Prof. Girish Kumar Choudhary
- Location: Patna, Bihar, India
- Affiliations: Patna University
- Website: Patna Training College

Patna Training College is a Bachelor of Education college situated in Patna, Bihar, India. It was established in 1908. The college, under Patna University, is approved by the National Council for Teacher Education and the University Grants Commission.

== See also ==
- List of teacher education schools in India
