= Patna–Digha Ghat line =

Railway line in India

Overview
- Status: Closed
- Owner: Indian Railways
- Locale: Patna
- Termini: R-Block; Digha Ghat railway station
- Stations: 6

Service
- Type: Commuter rail
- Train number(s): 73213, 73214, 73215, 73216
- Operator(s): East Central Railway
- Rolling stock: Diesel Multiple Unit (DMU)

History
- Opened: 1862
- Closed: 2018

Technical
- Number of tracks: 1
- Character: At-grade street running
- Track gauge: 5 ft 6 in (1,676 mm) broad gauge
- Electrification: No
- Operating speed: 20 km/h (12 mph)

Patna–Digha Ghat line was a railway line connecting Patna Junction and Digha Ghat railway station in the Indian city of Patna. It was constructed by the British in 1862, and functioned intermittently. The railway line was revived in 1962–63 and 2004 by the then Indian Railway Ministers, Jagjivan Ram and Lalu Prasad Yadav, respectively. Passenger train operations on the route were economically unviable due to low ridership. However, trains continued to run on the railway line in order to prevent encroachment. (Note: As of 2016, about 880 ha of land belonging to Indian Railways was under encroachment, either by temporary squatters, shacks or slum-dwellings, or by more permanent structures that had been built upon it.)

In August 2018, the railway line along with the surrounding land was transferred to the Bihar state government, which plans to convert it into a four- to six-lane roadway to ease traffic congestion in the city. The project is scheduled to be completed by mid-2021. Indian Railways got around 1.9-hectare (4.8-acre) of land on Hardinge Road from Bihar government in lieu of the 7 km long Patna–Digha Ghat line land it offered to the latter for the construction of R-Block-Digha Road.

== History ==
The Patna Junction–Digha Ghat rail track was laid in 1862 during the British Raj. The railway line was constructed to ease the transportation of leather items and footwear products to and from the Bata factory situated at Digha.

The railway line was revived in 1962–63 by Jagjivan Ram, the then railway minister of India, citing the historical importance of the line. The passenger train service continued until 1974, with goods trains running on the railway line until the early 1990s. Subsequently, the track remained non–functional until July 2004 when the Minister of Railways, Lalu Prasad Yadav, restarted the shuttle-train service along the line.

== Route ==
The Patna–Digha Ghat railway line is 6.2 kilometres (3.9 mi) long. It runs from Patna Junction railway station to Digha Ghat railway station, passing through the five railway stations (Rajiv Nagar, Shivpuri, Punaichak, Bailey Road and Secretariat) and the busy road-intersection of Hartali Mor on the way. The railway line is within the East Central Railway zone of the Indian Railways and is among the oldest rail lines in the zone.

== Operations ==
Historically, the railway line has been used to transport raw materials to the Bata factory at Digha and finished leather goods from the factory to different locations. After independence, the railway track was used to provide connectivity to the Food Corporation of India godown in Digha.

Following the revival of the railway track in 1962–63, a seven-coach passenger train powered by a steam engine was used to move passengers from Patna to Digha in the morning and from Digha to Patna in the evening. Flooding of the railway track in 1975 led to the railway line becoming non–operational. In July 2004, then Railway Minister of India Lalu Prasad Yadav inaugurated a Diesel multiple unit (DMU) train service named Shaheed Express on the revived Patna–Digha Ghat line from the R–Block halt railway station. The DMU train service was introduced in order to reduce traffic congestion on city roads.

== Problems and closing ==
The trains on the route ran during peak hours, which caused traffic-jams when they passed through the railway crossings at the busy Hartali Mor intersection. As of 2017, Indian Railways incurred a loss of about ₹6 lakhs (US$9,000) per month operating train on the track, with the ticket-sales bringing in only around ₹7,800 ($110) per month. However, despite the operational losses, fear of encroachment on the railway track and the approximately 71 acres (29 ha) of land around it led Indian Railways to continue running trains on the line.

In 2009–10, the Bihar state government proposed converting the Patna–Digha Ghat railway line into a roadway that would reduce traffic-congestion in the city. The railway ministry asked for ₹896 crores ($127 million) as value for the land it owned, and after the intervention of the Patna High Court, a transfer-price of ₹222 crores ($32 million) was agreed upon. On 14 June 2018, the Ministry of Railways gave in-principle approval for the plan, and on August 12 the land was formally transferred in a ceremony attended by railway minister Piyush Goyal and chief-minister of Bihar, Nitish Kumar. The state government plans to build a four- to six-lane, 40 m wide, road along the 8 km route, including a flyover and an underpass. The construction of the path is already completed and name is Atal Path.

== See also ==
- Patna Metro
- Hardinge Park
- Patna–Gaya line
- Patna–Mughalsarai section
