= Hardinge Road =

Hardinge Road Harding Road August Kranti Marg
- Road
- Location in Patna, India
- Coordinates: 25°36′04″N 85°7′44″E
- Country: India
- State: Bihar
- Metro: Patna

Languages
  - Spoken: Hindi, English, Magahi
- Time zone: UTC+5:30 (IST)
- PIN: 800001; 800015
- Planning agency: Patna Metropolitan Area Authority
- Civic agency: Patna Municipal Corporation

Hardinge Road, also spelled as Harding Road (officially August Kranti Marg) is a major road and administrative locality in central Patna, Bihar, India. The road forms part of the city's historic administrative district and is associated with several important government institutions, including the Patna Secretariat. It is named after Lord Charles Hardinge, Viceroy of India from 1910 to 1916.

== History ==
The road originated during the early twentieth century when Bankipore was developed as the capital of the newly created Province of Bihar and Orissa in 1912. Several roads, public buildings and institutions in the new administrative area were named after British administrators associated with the establishment of the province.

Hardinge Road was named after Baron Hardinge of Penshurst, who served as Viceroy of India during the period when Bihar was separated from the Bengal Presidency. The nearby Hardinge Park, established in 1916 and now known as Shaheed Veer Kunwar Singh Azadi Park, was among the earliest public parks in Patna and remains an important historical landmark associated with the development of the city's administrative district.

== Location ==
Hardinge Road is situated in central Patna near the Secretariat area, Gardanibagh and Rajbansi Nagar. It lies south of Shaheed Veer Kunwar Singh Azadi Park and forms part of the administrative district developed during the early twentieth century. The road is distinct from Hardinge Park Road, which runs adjacent to the park area and the site of the proposed Hardinge Park railway terminal.

The road extends through the Secretariat–Gardanibagh corridor and is connected to:

- Bailey Road (Nehru Path) to the west and southwest.
- Beer Chand Patel Path to the north.
- Gardanibagh to the south.
- Rajbansi Nagar to the west.
- R Block and the Secretariat area to the northwest.
- Patna Junction and the city centre to the north and northeast.

The locality occupies a strategic position between Patna's administrative district and major transport facilities, including Patna Junction railway station and the R Block area.

== Landmarks ==
Several important institutions and landmarks are located on or near Harding Road, including:

- Patna Secretariat (Old Secretariat)
- Shaheed Veer Kunwar Singh Azadi Park
- Sachiwalay Halt railway station
- New Capital Circle office of PMC
- Government offices of the Government of Bihar
- Residential neighbourhoods of Rajbansi Nagar and Gardanibagh

The Patna Secretariat, completed in 1917, remains one of the most prominent colonial-era administrative buildings in the city.

== Transport ==
Hardinge Road is connected to the wider road network of Patna through Bailey Road, Beer Chand Patel Path and other arterial roads.

Public transport facilities include:

- Sachiwalay Halt railway station
- R Block (Multi Model) transport hub
- Patna Junction railway station

The area is expected to benefit from the Patna Metro through the nearby Patna Junction metro station and associated multimodal transport infrastructure.

A new suburban railway facility, the Hardinge Park Terminal, is under development near Hardinge Park to improve regional rail connectivity and reduce congestion at Patna Junction.
