= Gyarah Murti =

Statue in New Delhi, India

Coordinates: 28°36′36″N 77°11′30″E

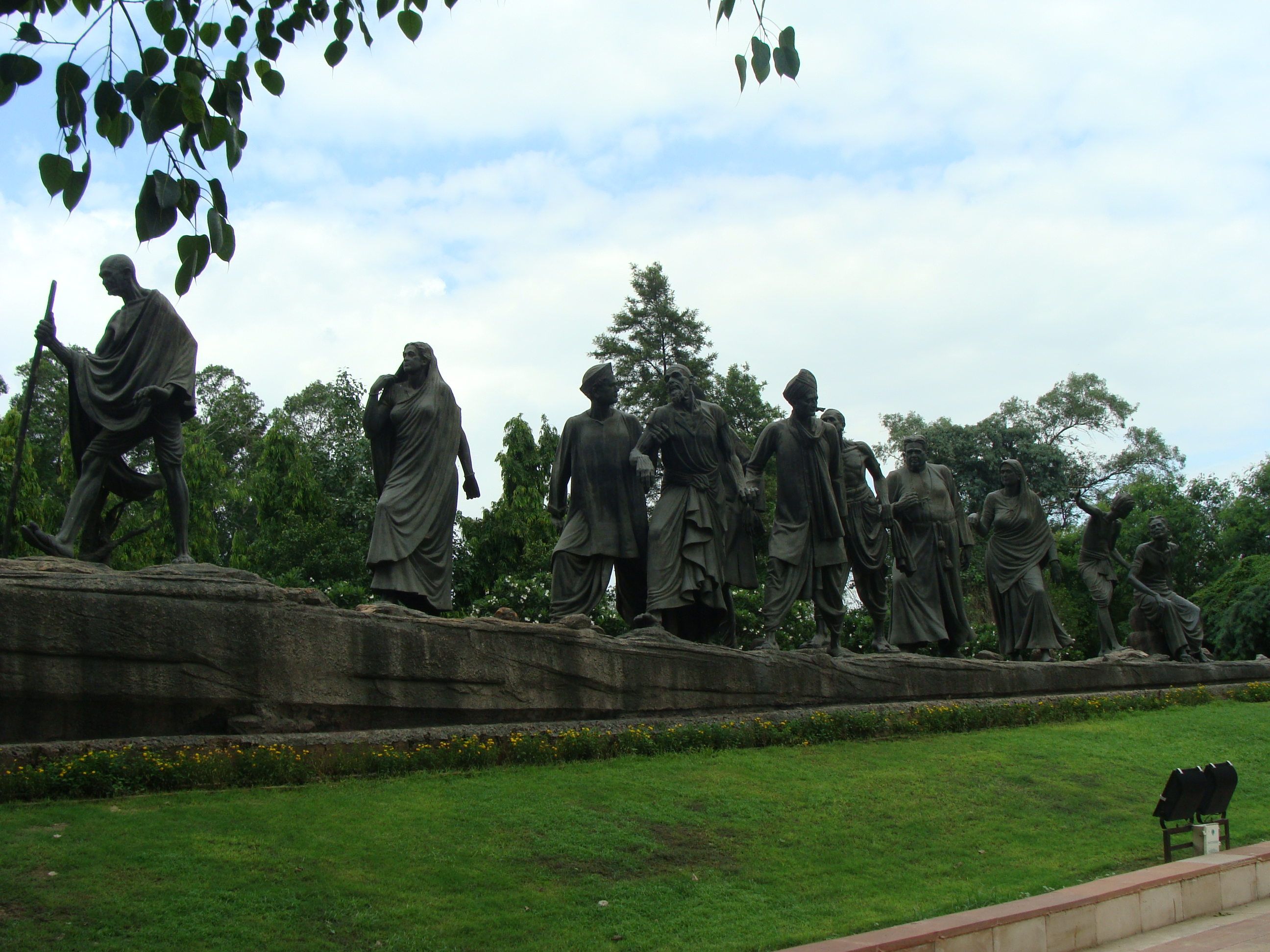
- The Gyarah Murti statue
- Interactive map of Gyarah Murti
- Location: President's Estate, New Delhi, India

Site notes
- Architect: Devi Prasad Roy Choudhury

Gyarah Murti is a monument located in New Delhi, India, commemorating the country's struggle for independence under the leadership of Mahatma Gandhi. Devi Prasad Roy Choudhury is credited as its sculptor. An ensemble of eleven statues, ten represent people from diverse sociocultural, religious and economic backgrounds following Gandhi in the lead. Widely believed to depict the Dandi March, the statue has been replicated in other cities in India and was featured on the old 500-rupee currency note.

== Location ==
The statue is located near the Rashtrapati Bhavan, New Delhi, at the T-junction where Sardar Patel Marg meets Mother Teresa Crescent. The statue is approached through Sardar Patel Marg and the entire locality is known as Gyarah Murti.

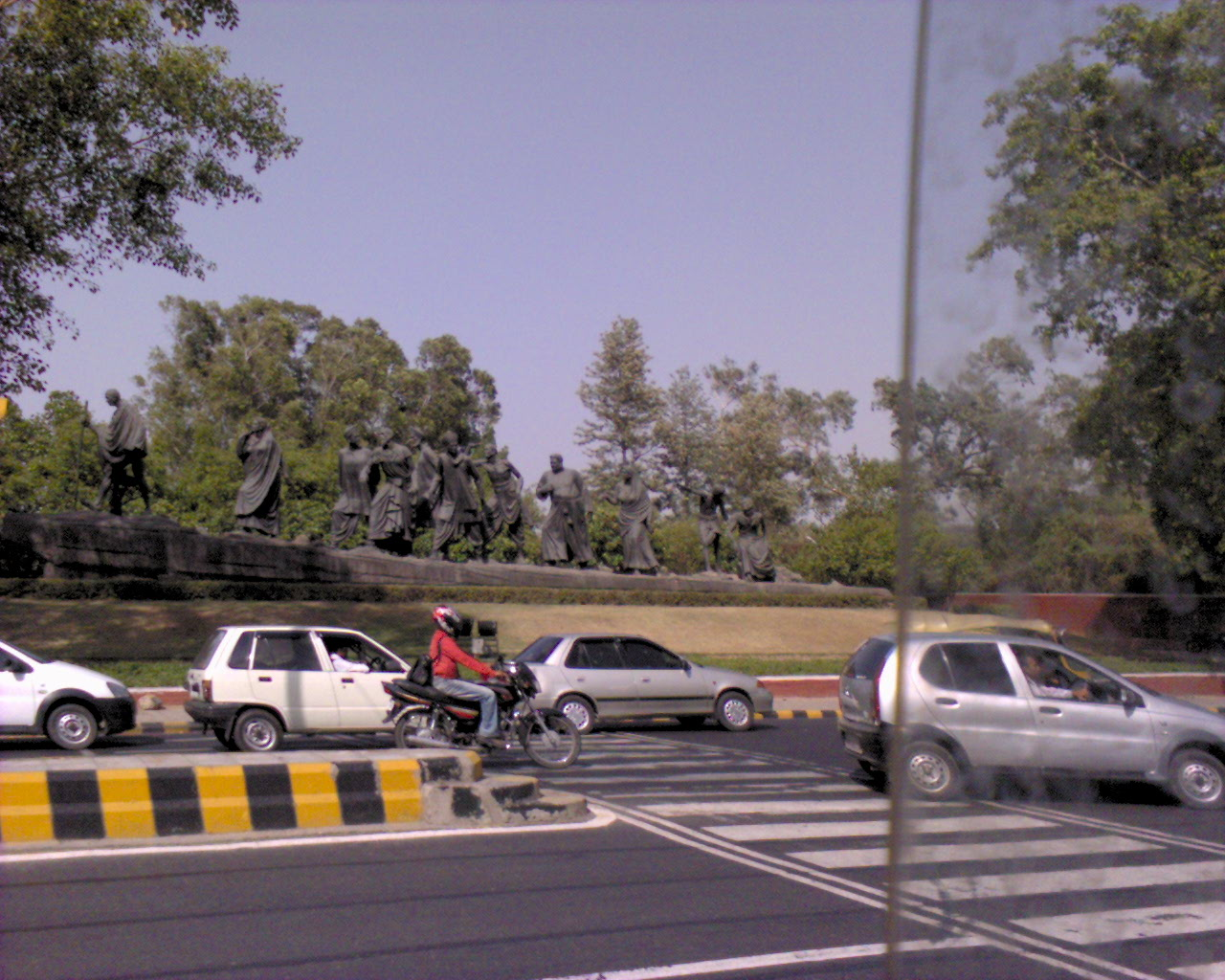
The statue is located at the junction of Sardar Patel Marg and Mother Teresa Crescent.

== Sculptor ==
Devi Prasad Roy Choudhury is credited as the creator of the statue which was commissioned by the Government of India in 1972 as a national monument to commemorate the silver jubilee of Indian independence. It bears semblance to the Martyr's Memorial in Patna, which was inaugurated in 1956, and features six figures following a flag bearer. The Martyr's Memorial in Patna commemorates the martyrdom of seven students who were shot dead by the Gurkha Military Police as they attempted to hoist the Congress flag at the Patna Secretariat as part of the Quit India Movement.

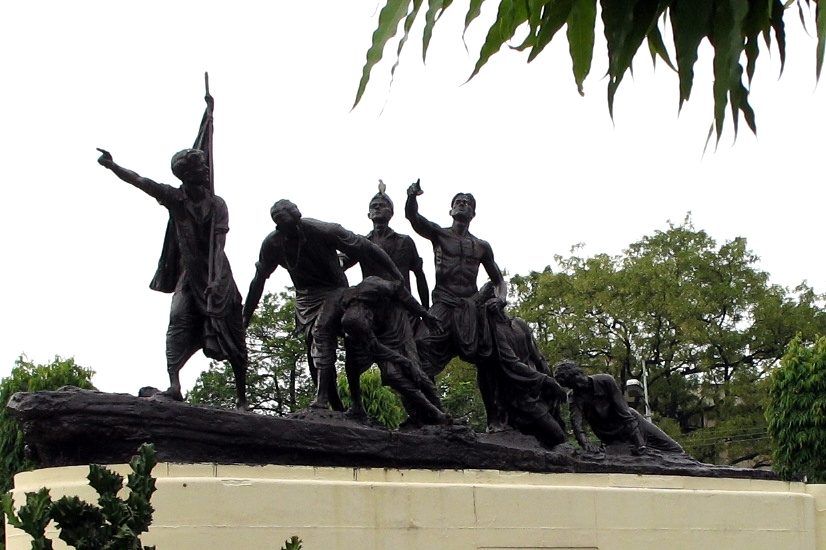
Martyr's Memorial in Patna

== Design ==
The statue features at its head Mahatma Gandhi who is followed by ten other persons who include a woman with a sari draped over her head, a group of three men – a Hindu, a Sikh and a Muslim, a turbaned man, an emaciated man, a Christian priest, a woman and a young man urging a tired old man to join the group. The statues are bronze cast and have a height of 8 feet (2.4 m), and the entire installation is 26 metres (85 ft) long and 3 metres (9.8 ft) tall.

It is commonly believed that the statue represents Gandhi's march to Dandi and that certain figures have been modelled on Matangini Hazra, Sarojini Naidu, Brahmabandhab Upadhyay and Abbas Tyabji. However, both these assumptions have been disputed. It has been contended that the statue is not a representation of the Salt March as were no women among the group of satyagrahis who accompanied Gandhi on this march. The plaque at the statue states that it was built "In memory of the countless Indians who, generation after generation, struggled and sacrificed against foreign rule. Mahatma Gandhi's leadership of the Indian National Congress finally won independence and Jawaharlal Nehru became the first Prime Minister of free India on 15 August 1947." As is the case in Choudhary's other works, the figures that constitute the Gyarah Murti, with the exception of Gandhi, are not persons of eminence but represent common people drawn from various classes and communities of India united in the common cause of seeking India's independence. The statue is one of Delhi's best-known examples of public art.

== Replicas and other depictions ==
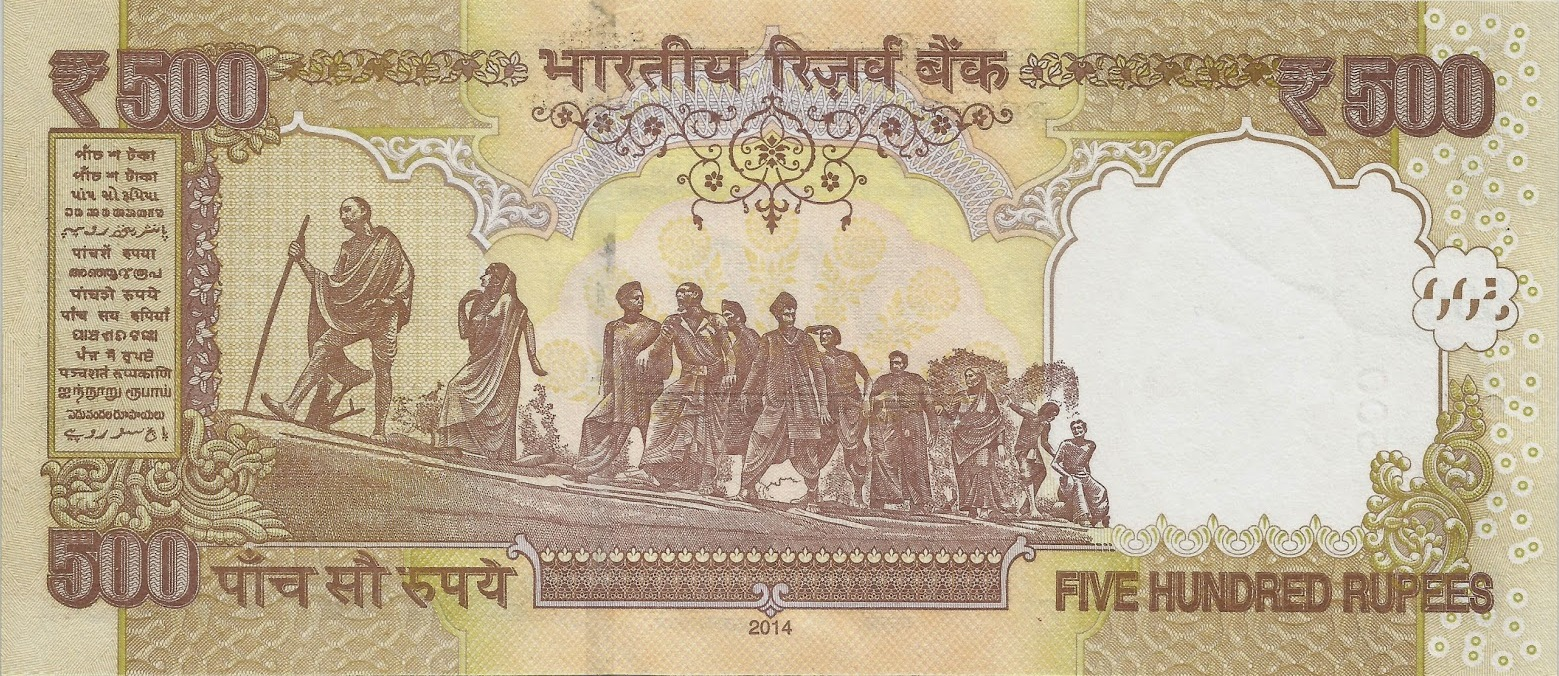
Reverse of the ₹500 banknote between October 1997 – November 2016

Who Deviated First?, a digital print on archival paper by the artist Gigi Scaria, is a morphed photograph of the Gyarah Murti where the statues following Gandhi have been turned around and appear to walk in the opposite direction. The 2010 work is a comment on India's divergence from Gandhi's ideals and its growing communal and caste violence. A replica of the Gyarah Murti was installed in Mysore, Karnataka, in 2011, whereas the copy built in 2015 in Godhra in Gujarat met with controversy when it emerged that it had only nine followers instead of ten as in the original. Following widespread criticism, the municipal authorities were forced to fix the error. Gyarah Murti featured on a 2010 postage stamp issued by Togo. It also featured on a 2019 postage stamp released by India Post as part of a series on Gandhian heritage in Modern India to commemorate the 150th birthday of Mahatma Gandhi. India's 500-rupee currency note featured the statue on its reverse side.

== Controversies ==
In 1999 the round spectacles on Gandhi's statue were stolen, and the statue has since remained without them. The thief was never caught, and the theft has remained unresolved.
