= General Post Office, Patna =

- Location within Patna
- Former names: Post and Telegraph Office, Patna
- Alternative names: Patna GPO

General information
- Status: Completed
- Type: Government
- Architectural style: Gothic Revival architecture
- Location: Buddh Marg, Patna, India, India
- Coordinates: 25°36′12″N 85°07′55″E
- Current tenants: India Post
- Groundbreaking: 1 December 1912 (keystone setting)
- Construction started: 1912
- Completed: 1917
- Opened: 1 July 1917
- Cost: INR 2.69 lakh
- Owner: India Post

Design and construction
- Architect: Joseph Fearis Munnings

The General Post Office, Patna (abbreviation GPO, commonly known as the Patna GPO) is a British Raj building located in Patna, Bihar, India. It is the central post office of the city of Patna and the headquarters of India Post's Bihar Circle. It is located on the intersection of Buddh Marg and New Market Station Road. The post office handles most of the city's inbound and outbound mails and parcels. As of 2017, GPO Patna delivers 1 lakh letters and parcels daily through 96 postmen. It also has more than 12 lakh savings accounts.

The building was designed by New Zealand-born architect Joseph Fearis Munnings. The GPO campus also houses the office of the Chief Postmaster General for Bihar Circle. The construction of building started in 1912 and was completed in 1917. The building was opened to public in 1917 and was then known as Post and Telegraph Office. The building was part of the New Patna that British established in 1912 after the division of Bihar and Orissa from Bengal Presidency. The post office celebrated its centenary year in 2017.

View of Post and Telegraph Office, Patna (1916)

== History ==
At the Delhi Durbar of 1911 King George V announced the creation of a new province of Bihar and Orissa under a lieutenant-governor. British decided Patna to be the capital of the new province. With this came the need to establish government offices and buildings such as the Patna Secretariat, Raj Bhavan (Bihar), Patna University campus, Patna High Court, Post and Telegraph Office.

Munnings was appointed as Consulting Architect to the Government of Bihar and Orissa in the year 1912 and was tasked with the planning and development of New Patna. Lord Hardinge laid the stone of new buildings in Patna on 1 December 1912. The construction of the building started in 1912 and was completed in 1917. It was opened for the public on 1 July 1917 with 17 employees in total and was built over an area of 22 acres.

Patna GPO when built was known as Post and Telegraph Office. It was however, not the first post office in Patna. The first post office in official records of Patna was near Anisabad area. This post office was later shifted to Bankipore, 150 metres away from the current GPO building. When the GPO building was constructed, the Bankipore post office moved to Muradabad area on Ashok Rajpath. The first post office of the province of Bihar and Orissa was opened near Hazaribagh - now part of the state of Jharkhand.

== Building and architecture ==
The post and telegraph office, Patna was built in Gothic Revival architectural style. J.F. Munnings was the main architect on the project and was influenced by choice of local materials and plain designs. These constraints were also practical in nature as it was the time when World War I was waging and British Empire was one of the main belligerents of the allied powers. This led to the plain designs of the building as the empire was spending more on war efforts.

The building is a flat roofed, plastered brick building featuring Chhajja. The building also has Mughal features as when built, it was located on the edge of the old city of Patna and was on the road leading from old city to the new capital city of Patna. It also features an arcade.

The original structure had three porticoes - north, south and east. East portico functioned as the main entrance. The western flank was added later. The ground floor has seven rooms and four halls with counter areas. The first floor houses 14 halls which are quite huge in size. The chief postmaster's office is now located in the central portion, while the deputy postmaster's office is located underneath it.

The building was renovated in the year 2000 at a cost of INR 1.25 crore. The renovation also added five gardens, including one having medicinal herbs to the campus.

== Location ==
Patna GPO is located in Beer Chand Patel Path locality of Patna. The main building is located on the intersection of Buddh Marg and New Market Station Road. The main portico of the building faces in the south east direction. GPO is less than 1 km from Patna Junction and around 6 km from Patna Airport. Hardinge Park is located on west side of the GPO campus.

== Current use ==
Patna GPO currently serves as the main post office of the city of Patna and is also the head office of Bihar circle of India Post. The area of the building is around 2.5 lakh sq ft and houses almost 296 employees. One multipurpose hall on ground floor houses the counters of all the mail and booking services. The other three halls on ground floor deal with financial services, staff and philately. A separate area for 96 postmen is housed in seven other rooms on the same floor in the southern flank. Mail, delivery and parcel sections are also present in the same section. There are separate counters for senior citizens and students in the northern side of the building.

== See also ==
- Patna Secretariat
- Raj Bhavan (Bihar)
