= Old Sachdeva railway station =

Railway station in Patna district, India

General information
- Location: Bailey Road, Patna, Bihar; India
- Coordinates: 25.6038°N 85.1191°E
- Elevation: 58 metres (190 ft)
- System: Indian Railways station
- Owner: Indian Railways
- Operator: East Central Railway
- Platforms: 1
- Tracks: 4
- Connections: Auto stand

Construction
- Structure type: Standard (on-ground station)
- Parking: No
- Cycle facilities: No

Other information
- Status: Defunct
- Station code: OSH
- Zone(s): East Central Railway
- Division(s): Danapur

Services
Preceding station	Indian Railways	Following station
Bailey Road towards ?	East Central Railway zone Patna–Digha Ghat section	Sachiwalay Halt towards ?
Location
- Location within India Location within Bihar

Old Sachdeva railway station (station code: OSH) was a small railway station in Patna district, Bihar. It served Patna city. The station had a single platform. Due to low ridership, little to no revenue for Railways and congestion of areas through which the tracks ran, this route(and this station) have been closed and property transferred to state government for building of an expressway.
