= Aney =

Aney may refer to:

- Madhav Shrihari Aney (1880–1968), 2nd governor of Bihar
  - 1, Aney Marg, residence of the governor of Bihar
- Jessie Aney (born 1998), American tennis player
- Mahesh Aney, Indian cinematographer
- Aney, village near Dirkou, Niger
