= 1, Aney Marg =

Official residence of the Chief Minister of Bihar

- Location within Patna

General information
- Location: Patna, Bihar, India
- Coordinates: 25°35′58″N 85°6′25″E
- Current tenants: Samrat Choudhary & his family

1, Aney Marg in Patna is the official residence of the Chief Minister of Bihar. It has been named after Madhav Shrihari Aney, the Maharashtra born politician, who was also the state's second post-Independence Governor. The fields surrounding the bungalow have been planted with 160 herbal and aromatic plants.

It is currently occupied by long-time Chief Minister Nitish Kumar, who would vacate it soon for the now-incumbent Samrat Choudhary.

The previous chief ministers of Bihar to occupy the bungalow were, Bindeshwari Dubey, Bhagwat Jha Azad, Satyendra Narayan Sinha, Lalu Prasad, Rabri Devi & Jitan Ram Manjhi .

== See also ==
- List of official residences of India
- List of chief ministers of Bihar
- Raj Bhavan (Bihar)
- Daroga Prasad Rai Path
