= Lok Bhavan, Patna =

Official residence of the Governor of Bihar in Patna, Bihar State, India

Lok Bhavan

- Location within Patna

General information
- Architectural style: Stripped Neo-Classical
- Location: Patna, Bihar, India
- Coordinates: 25°36′3″N 85°6′11″E
- Construction started: 1912
- Completed: 1917

Design and construction
- Architect: Joseph Fearis Munnings

Lok Bhavan formerly Raj Bhavan (from Hindi: Government House) is the official residence of the governor of the Indian state of Bihar . It is located in the state capital of Patna. Construction started in 1912 and was completed in 1917. It was designed by New Zealand-born architect Joseph Fearis Munnings.

Prior to the Independence of India, the building was known as Government House and was the official residence of the lieutenant governor of Bihar and Orissa from 1917 to 1920 and then the governor of Bihar and Orissa from 1920 to 1936. Later on with the division of Bihar and Orissa in 1936, it became the official residence of the governor of Bihar. It is currently known as Raj Bhavan or Governor's House.

== History ==
View of Government House from N.E. corner (1917)

Boudoir, First Floor - Government House (1917)

Bihar and Orissa were part of the Bengal Presidency till 1912. At the Delhi Durbar of 1911 King George V announced the creation of a new province of Bihar and Orissa under a lieutenant-governor. The capital for the new province was chosen as the city of Patna. An old city already existed, but the British government decided to build a new city west of old Patna. The new city was to be known as New Patna and covered an area of approximately three square miles. The site chosen was above an abandoned meander of the Son River.

Mr. Munnings was appointed as Consulting Architect to the Government of Bihar and Orissa in the year 1912 and was tasked with the planning and development of New Patna. He planned and oversaw the construction of several buildings in the area - notable buildings being - Government House, Patna Secretariat, General Post Office, Patna, Commissioner's Court and Patna University campus.

Lord Hardinge laid the stone of new buildings in Patna on 1 December 1912. The construction of Government House started in 1912 and was completed in 1917. The building was placed opposite the secretariat and the two buildings were connected by a 200 ft wide road known as King George's Avenue. The avenue was 1 km long and is currently known as Desh Ratna Marg.

== Building and architecture ==
The building is a three storied building set out in Palladian form and is constructed in a stripped neo-classical style of architecture with its longitudinal axis running north and south directions. It is constructed in brick and then plastered and also features a hipped Allahabad tiled roof. The ground floor accommodates the offices and the Durbar Hall also known as council chamber, while the first floor has reception rooms. The drawing and dining rooms are also located on the first floor with each measuring 43 by 33 feet.

The Durbar Hall and Ballroom lies on the west of the main block with an area of 65.5 by 43 feet and rise through two floors of the building. The hall is overlooked by colonnaded balconies of the first floor and has a large widening staircase. Both the north and south ends of the main block accommodates the guesthouse block and kitchen. The main block of the house is connected to the kitchen by a connecting bridge. Munnings designed the house with each floor having distinctive functions - ground floor for offices, first floor for reception rooms and second floor for main bedrooms.

The top floor consists of bedrooms - 15 in total - each having its own bathroom and furnished with electric ceiling fans, a luxury item at that time. Munnings also installed lifts at both ends of the main building. The notable design features of the building are decorative plaster work in the drawing, dining rooms and the Durbar Hall. The expanded metal plastered ceilings and jack arch flooring are also distinctive features inside the building. The floor of Durbar Hall is made up of teak planking supported on springs which also doubled up as a ballroom. The house also features highly decorative marble fireplaces and mouldings.

== Compound ==
The Government House at Patna was planned on a compound of 100 acres in area. The campus contained a number of lawn tennis courts between the two main approach drives. A compound wall surrounds the house and Munnings also designed the main gate piers and police barracks to guard the entrance. The gardens in the campus was designed by Munnings and Mr. Head - then Superintendent of the Government Parks and Gardens, Allahabad - in 1916.

== Donation of land to Patna Zoo ==
In 1970, then Governor of Bihar - Nityanand Kanungo - donated 34 acres of land from the Governor House campus for the establishment of a Botanical Garden.

== Location ==
Raj Bhavan is located in Rajbansi locality of Patna. The roundabout in front of the main gate of Governor's House has a statue of Rajendra Prasad - the first President of India. Desh Ratna Marg - Desh Ratna is an honorary title given to Rajendra Prasad - connects the Raj Bhavan to Patna Secretariat, while Anne Marg at approximately an angle of 45 degrees in south east direction connects to the residence of Chief Minister of Bihar - 1 Anne Marg. Raj Bhavan is around 3 km from Patna airport and around 5 km from Patna Junction.

== See also ==
- Patna Secretariat
- 1 Anne Marg
- Government Houses of the British Indian Empire
