= Beer Chand Patel Path =

Beer Chand Patel Path Gardiner Road
- Road
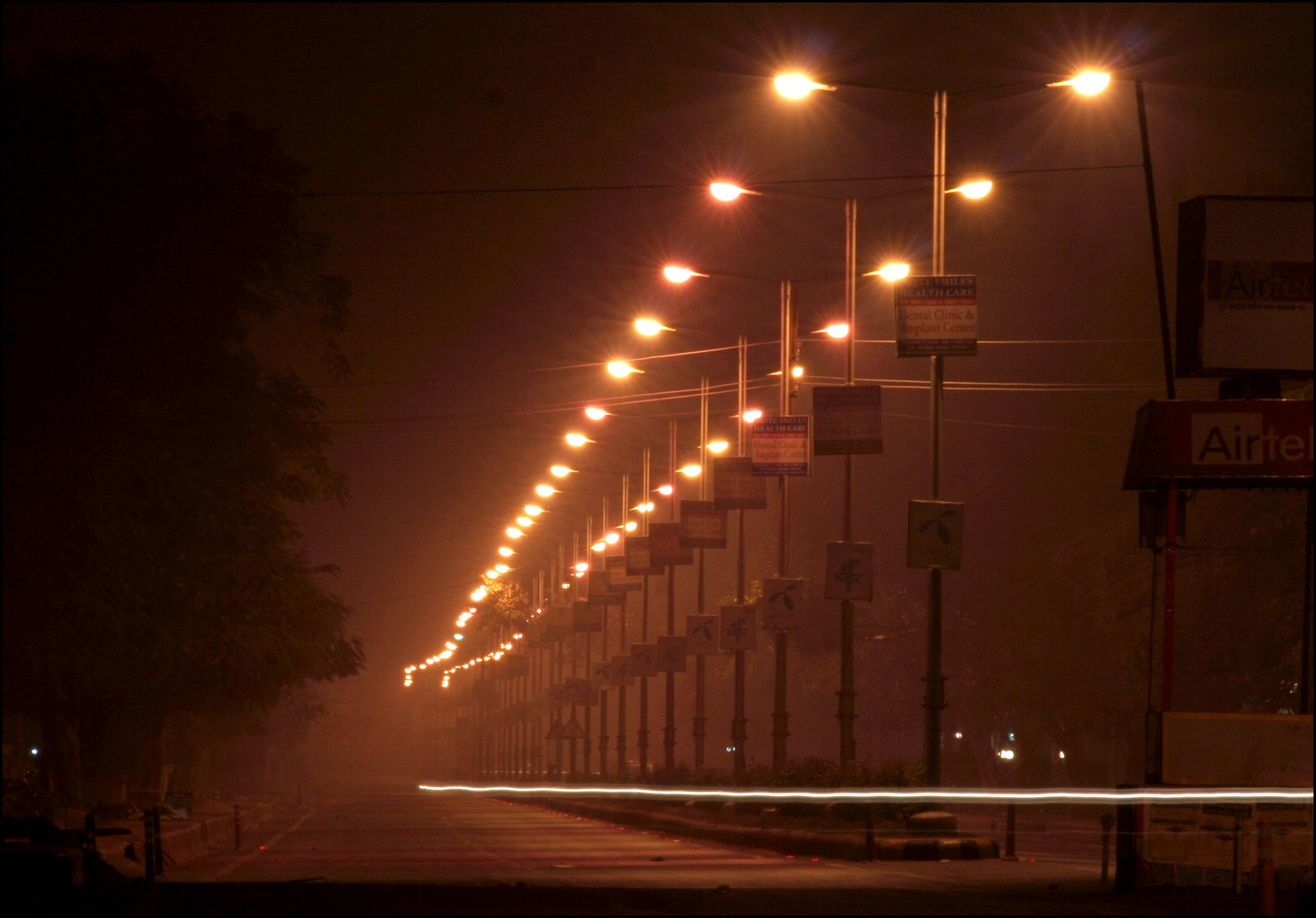
- Nightscape from Chanakya towards Income tax roundabout

- Location in Patna, India
- Coordinates: 25°36′21″N 85°7′42″E
- Country: India
- State: Bihar
- Metro: Patna

Languages
  - Spoken: Hindi, English
- Time zone: UTC+5:30 (IST)
- PIN: 800001
- Planning agency: Patna Metropolitan Area Authority
- Civic agency: Patna Municipal Corporation

Beer Chand Patel Path (formerly Gardiner Road) is major thoroughfare in Patna. It is named after the renowned freedom fighter and Congress politician Bir Chand Patel. It branches off from Income Tax Golamber and terminates at R-Block Golamber.

== Overview ==
R Block is the area near R Block Golambar at the confluence of Beer Chand Patel Marg and Hardinge Road. Daroga Prasad Rai Path connects Bir Chand Patel Path with S K Puri. R Block mainly is an area made up of government quarters. It has famous hotels of Patna like Chanakya and Kautilya. It has a large number of government offices and political party's offices. Nav Lakha Durga Mandir is a major landmark of this area. Road or driving distance from Patna Junction railway station to Beer Chand Patel Path is 3 km and from Patna Airport is 4 km.

== Major landmarks ==
- Bhartiya Janata Party Pradesh Karlaya
- Hotel Chanakya
- Hotel Kautilya Bihar, BSTDC
- Presidents' Chamber
- R Block Chowk (Veer Kunwar Singh Chowk)
- Rabindra Bhawan
- Hotel Patliputra Ashok
- Janata Dal (United) HQ
- Rashtriya Janata Dal state office

== Nearby places ==
- New Patna Club (0.2 km)
- Adalat Ganj (0.4 km)
- Patna G.P.O Campus (0.5 km)
- Hardinge Park (0.5 km)
- Adalatganj (0.5 km)
- R Block (0.7 km)
- Patna Women's College (0.7 km)
- Mithapur Railway Over Bridge (0.7 km)
- Mount Carmel High School, Patna (0.8 km)
- Patna Museum Campus (0.9 km)
- Miller School

== See also ==
- Bailey Road, Patna
- Daroga Prasad Rai Path
