= D. P. Roy Choudhury =

Indian sculptor and painter (1899–1975)

D. P. Roy Choudhury MBE
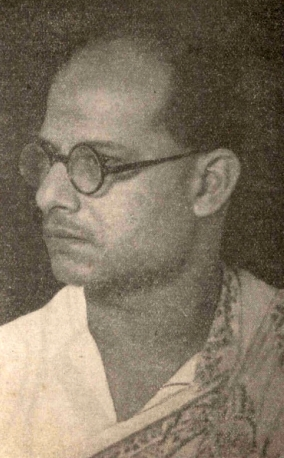
- Born: 15 June 1899; Tejhat, Rangpur district, British India
- Died: 15 October 1975 (aged 76); Madras, Tamil Nadu
- Occupations: Painter; sculptor; educator
- Known for: Bronze sculptures Triumph of Labour; Martyrs' Memorial Patna
- Spouse: Charulata Roy Choudhury
- Children: 1, Bhaskar Roy Choudhury
- Awards: Padma Bhushan (1958); Fellow of Lalit Kala Akademi (1962)

Devi Prasad Roy Choudhury MBE (15 June 1899 – 15 October 1975) was an Indian sculptor, painter and educator. He is well known for his monumental bronze sculptures, especially the Triumph of Labour and the Martyrs' Memorial, and is rated by many as one among the major artists of Indian modern art. He worked in a broad spectrum of mediums including watercolors, expressionist landscapes and commissioned portraits. Large scale sculptures were his particular strength and he made social realism the cornerstone of his art. In addition to painting and sculpting, he also wrestled, played the flute, engaged in hunting and wrote short stories in his spare time.

He served as the principal of Madras School of Art from 1929 to 1957 and became one of the first Indians to head a government educational institution at the time. The Government of India awarded him the third highest civilian honour of the Padma Bhushan, in 1958, for his contributions in the field of arts. He was elected as the Fellow of Lalit Kala Akademi in 1962.

== Early life and education ==
Roy Choudhury was born on 15 June 1899 at Tejhat, in Rangpur in the undivided Bengal of the British India (presently in Bangladesh), and did his academic studies from home. He took his first painting lessons under the guidance of Abanindranath Tagore, the renowned Bengali painter. He also received lessons about life-drawing and portraiture in western style from an Italian painter named Boeiss. This was followed by sculpture training under the guidance of Hiranmoy Roy Choudhury, who taught him to build in rather than carve in his figures.

== Career ==
Roy Choudhury’s interest of getting into art caused a rift between him and his zamindar grandfather, the head of the family, who disinherited him. Subsequently, he had to take up work as a scene painter for a theatre in North Kolkata and taught art at a boys' school in the city. He also taught for some time at Santiniketan where Ramkinkar Baij was one of his students.

=== Madras School of Art ===
Roy Choudhury joined the Madras School of Art in 1929 as a superintendent. He thus became one of the first Indians to head an educational institution that was run by the British. He accepted the post on the understanding that he should be permitted to take up private assignments. During his thirty years at the school, he inspired several artists form South India. He helped spark creativity among the students who had produced only conventional work until that time. This entirely changed the existing image of the school as an industrial arts centre. Subsequently, he was honoured by the British Government as an MBE in 1937 for his service.

=== Artistic output ===
Despite being in charge of the school for almost three decades, Roy Choudhury was quite productive as an artist. He maintained two studios, one at his residence and the other at the school. He worked from early morning till late in the evening, mostly on large-scale sculptures. However, he did not hold any exhibition of his works during his lifetime, as he believed:

I consider my modest studio as a sort of old, sacred temple devoted to the cause of art. I worship the objects I create. I can never think of them being carried now and then for public view. Those who are real lovers of art are welcome to my studio. Don’t the devotees pay a visit to the dilapidated temple in a village?

When Lalit Kala Akademi was founded in 1954, he was appointed as the founder chairman. He also served as president of the UNESCO Art Seminar conducted in 1955 at Tokyo and the Nikhil Bharat Bangiya Sahitya Sammilani of 1956 organized in Chennai. Along with his art, he was well known for his Bengali short stories published in the Bengali magazines of the time.

== Works ==
=== Paintings ===
When Roy Choudhury studied under the guidance of Tagore, he mainly created paintings in his master’s style and technique. Flowing lines in the wash technique with flat tones can be seen in his early works. The subjects in his works were mostly based on mythological themes. After his exposure to the western art techniques, he created artworks in the western academic style. In the later part of his life, Choudhury was drawn towards the common man. He interacted with people of the poorer class and began drawing from life rather than from models. Moreover, he had also created a number of genre and landscape paintings. His other works include animal studies from his experiences during his hunting expeditions.

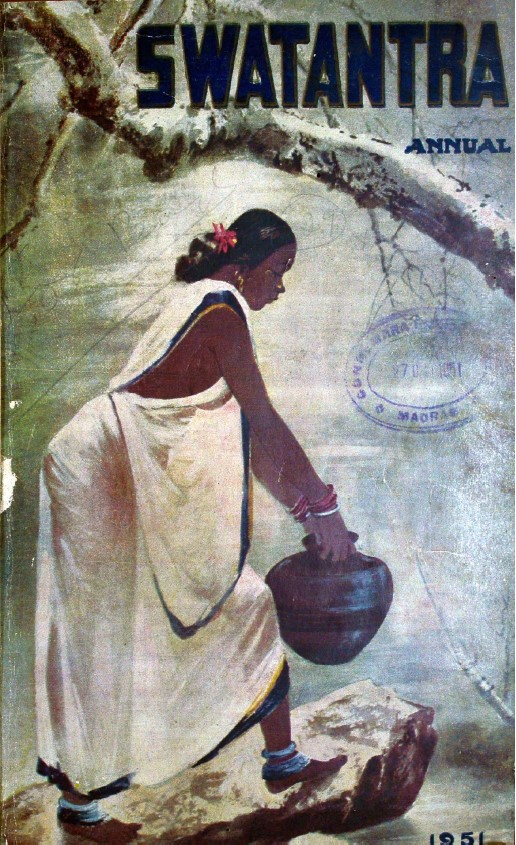
Painting by D. P. Roy Choudhury titled Poorna Kumbham published on the cover page of Swatantra Annual in 1951

Roy Choudhury experimented with different mediums such as tempera, oil, watercolor and pastels. In the 1930s, western art critics regarded him as one of the finest portrait painters in the world for his works in the oil medium. Some of the notable paintings the he created in Chennai are Green and Gold (exhibited at the Royal Academy of Arts, London), After the Storm (Japanese wash technique), Nirvana, Bridge, The Palace Doll, Durga Puja Procession, Abhisarika, and Pujarini.

=== Sculptures ===
Even though Roy Choudhury was a skilled painter, he is widely known for his public sculptures in the impressionistic style. His specialization was in casting the sculpture rather than carving it. He is reported to be influenced by the works of the French sculptor, Auguste Rodin. During his early days in Kolkata, he made the busts of Sir J. C. Bose, Percy Brown and Mrs. Brown. While in Chennai, his high professional standards constantly brought him number of private and public commissions, notably the portrait busts of British nobility of the time. Among those who sat for their portraits or monumental statues were – C. V. Kumaraswami Sastri (Chief Justice, Madras High Court), Lord Erskine (Governor of Madras), G. T. Boag (Governor of Orissa), George Stanley (Governor of Madras), C. P. Ramaswami Iyer, C. R. Reddy and C. Abdul Hakim to name a few. Portraits created from photographs included Annie Besant, Asutosh Mukherjee, Surendranath Banerjee, Mahatma Gandhi and Motilal Nehru which were considered Roy Choudhury's monumental works.

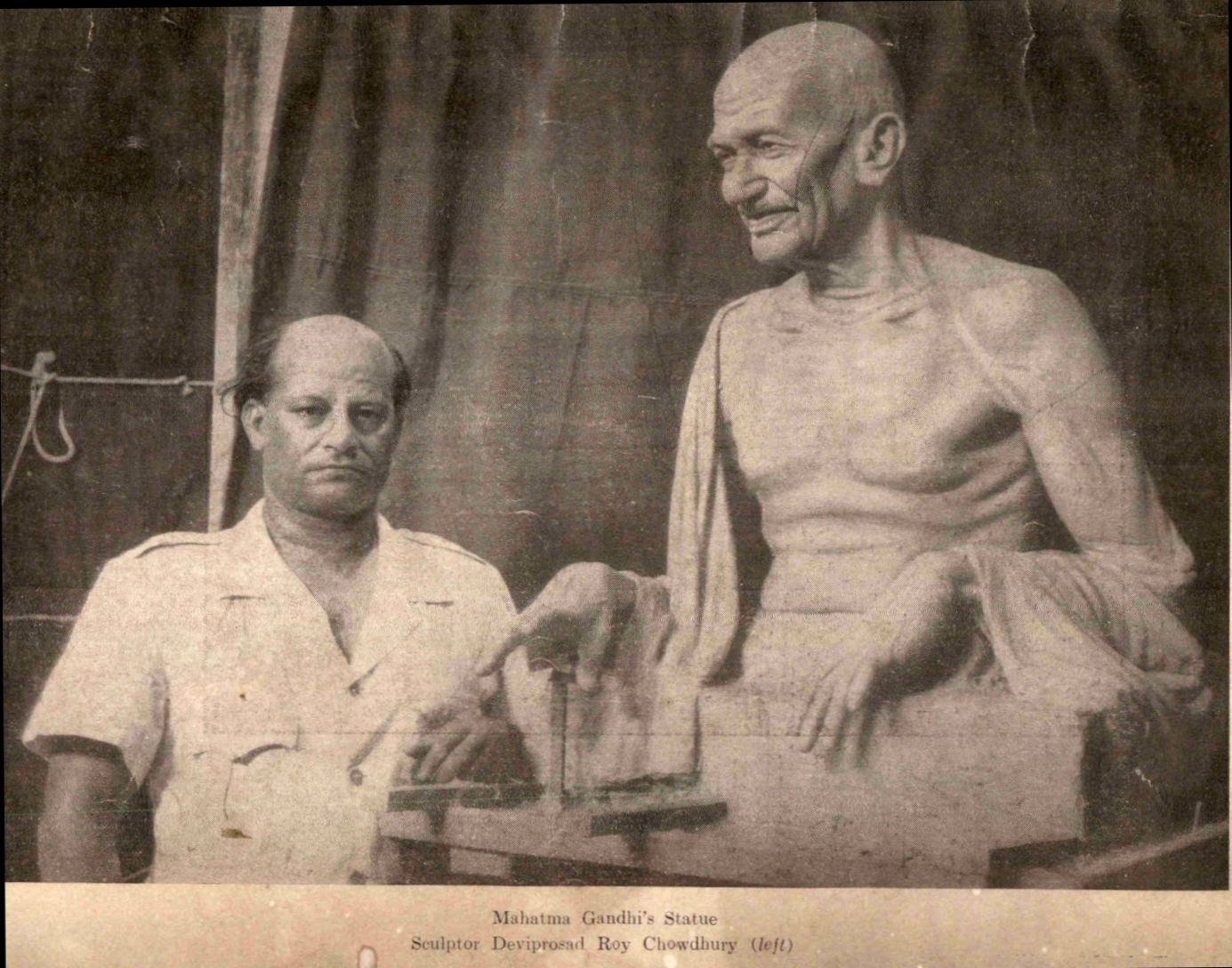
Roy Choudhury with his sculpture of Mahatma Gandhi

In his later sculptures, Roy Choudhury sought inspiration from his surroundings and social milieu, just like his paintings. One of his first multiple-figure reliefs was the Travancore Temple Entry Proclamation that he completed in the 1930s. It depicted the Temple Entry Proclamation that allowed the admission of the so-called low caste people into the Hindu temples in Travancore. He also produced some moving images of the Bengal famine of 1943, which showed a mother with her starving infant. Post India's independence in 1947, his grand sculptures and social commitment played an important role to memorialize the country's anti-colonial struggle. His compositions, the Triumph of Labour (1954) and the Martyrs’ Memorial (1956) continue to be outstanding examples of his depictions of social realism in this regard.

==== Triumph of Labour ====
On 1 May 1923, Malayapuram Singaravelu founded the Labour Kisan Party of Hindustan in Madras which was committed to protect the interests and rights of the working classes. The foundation ceremony was held on the May Day for a purpose as it was for the first time in India that the day was observed as International Workers' Day under the auspices of the newly formed party.

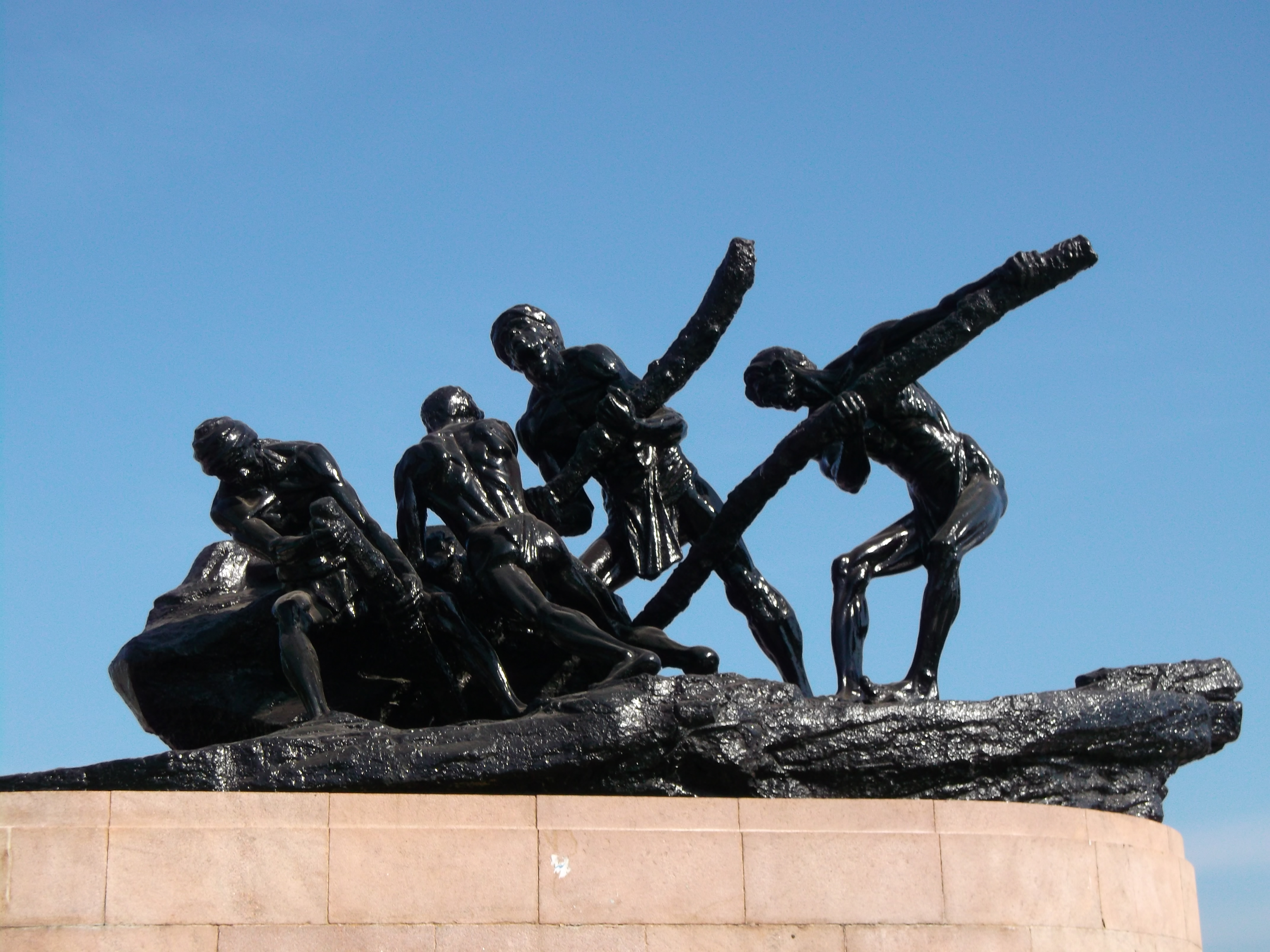
Triumph of Labour by D. P. Roy Choudhury in Chennai

Roy Choudhury’s sculpture is located at the Marina Beach, close to the site where Singaravelu organized the first Labour Day celebrations. It shows four figures engrossed in moving a heavy boulder, who appear to succeed in their task, thus signifying the Triumph of Labour. The sculpture highlights the intense hard work and effort put in by workers to shape India as it is today. A similar sculpture is also located outside the National Gallery of Modern Art building in New Delhi.

==== Martyrs' Memorial ====
Located outside the Patna Secretariat, the Martyrs’ Memorial stands tall as the symbolic representation of the sacrifice that the Indians made to achieve independence. It is a life-sized statue of seven young men who sacrificed their lives in the Quit India Movement to hoist the national flag on the Secretariat building.

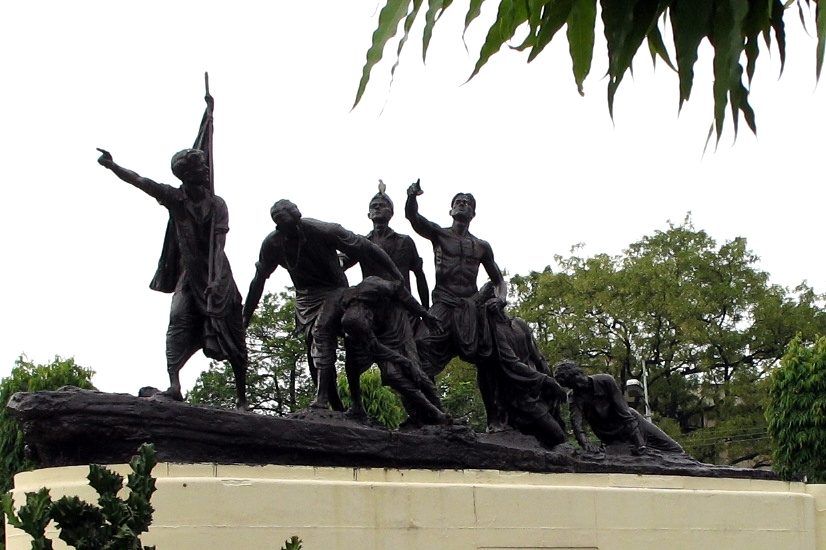
Martyrs' Memorial by D. P. Roy Choudhury in Patna

Roy Choudhury showcases the determined attitude and the spontaneity of movement of each defiant figure which emphasizes the strength of the entire composition. This sculpture was commissioned after India’s Independence and was unveiled by Rajendra Prasad in October 1956.

==== Gyarah Murti ====
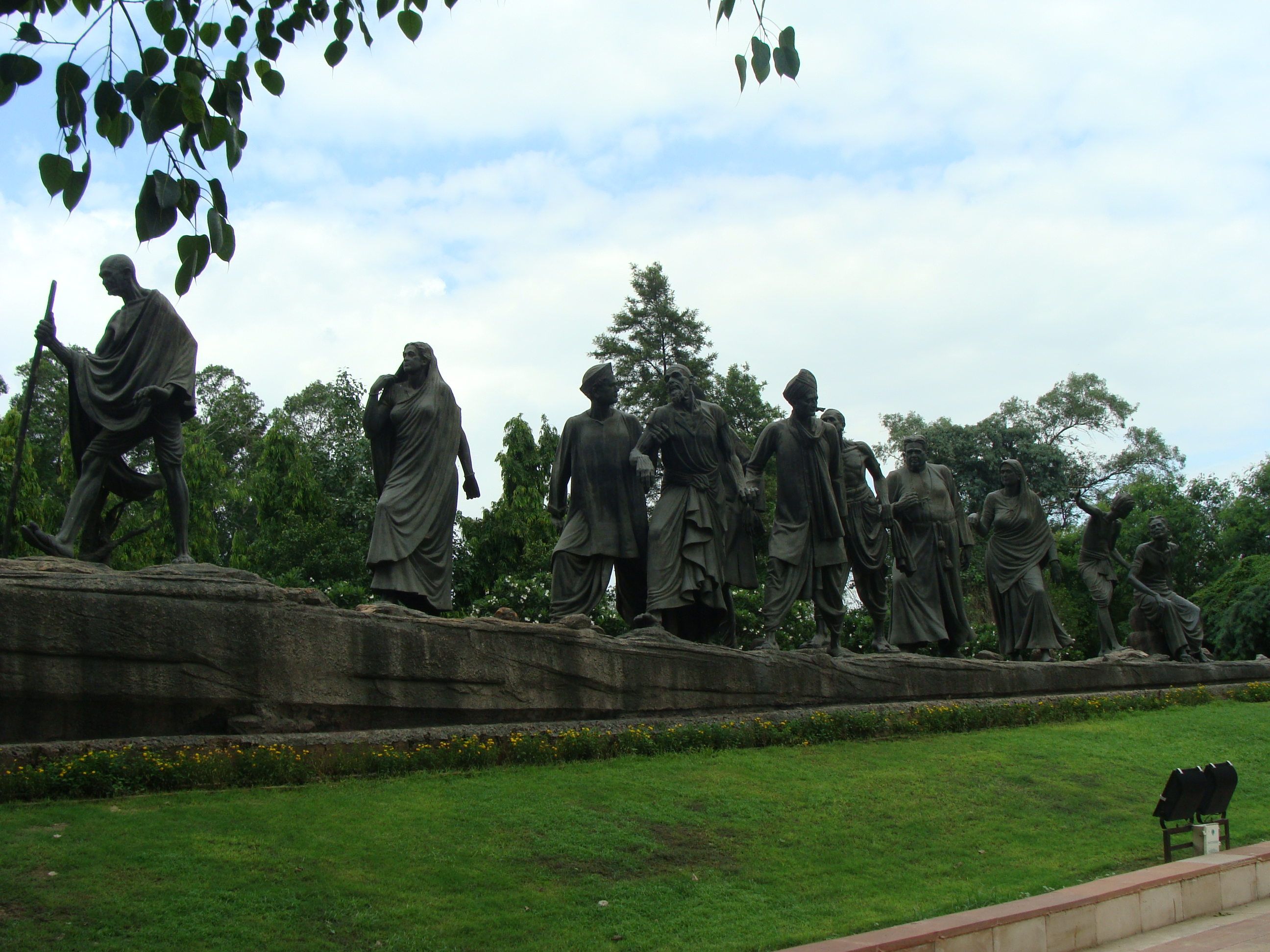
Gyarah Murti by D. P. Roy Choudhury in Delhi

A monumental sculpture titled Gyarah Murti, based on Dandi March has been erected along the road at the junction of Sardar Patel Marg and Teen Murti Marg in New Delhi. The task of creating this sculpture was entrusted to Roy Choudhury by the then Prime Minister, Jawaharlal Nehru. This sculpture is 29 meters long on the surface and 4 meters high, made of a combination of 11 figures. It was installed in 1982 after the death of Devi Prasad Roy Choudhury. The image of this sculpture was also printed on the Indian currency note of 500 rupees.

Some of his other important public sculptures include the statue of Mahatma Gandhi at Marina beach in Chennai, God of Destruction (plaster of paris), Rhythm, After the Bath, The Last Stroke, Victims of Hunger (1952) and When Winter Comes (1955), all made in bronze.

=== Public collections ===
His works are displayed at Government Museum, Chennai, National Gallery of Modern Art, New Delhi, Srichitralayam at Jaganmohan Palace, Salar Jung Museum, Hyderabad and Travancore Art Gallery, Kerala and are featured in many books, Indian Masters, Volume I, The Two Great Indian Artists and Art and Aesthetics of Deviprasad being some of them.

== Awards and recognition ==
In 1958, the Government of India awarded him the Padma Bhushan, the third highest Indian civilian honour. He received the Lalit Kala Akademi Fellowship in 1962 and, six years later, Rabindra Bharati University, Kolkata, honoured him with D.Litt. in 1968.

== Personal life ==
Roy Choudhury was a wealthy man owing to his success as an artist and reputation among the people of high society. However, he largely remained Bohemian at heart and often said, “I can never be all manners and no man even to please my wife.” Roy Choudhury had married Charulata and had one son, Bhaskar – a folk dancer, actor, choreographer, author and painter. Even though the couple was fond of each other, they had contrasting personalities. At times, Roy Choudhury's unconventional behaviour embarrassed Charulata who was a sophisticated woman and preferred a formal conduct.

=== Madras residence ===
Roy Choudhury and his family lived in a two-storey house with the drawing room and the bedrooms located on the first floor. The former room was huge with a highly polished red floor. A few Persian scatter rugs were spread on the floor and a couple of stuffed tiger heads shot by him lied there. On the off-white walls some of his popular paintings hung at eye-level. In one corner of the room stood one of his finest portrait sculptures titled Babuji – a head study of his father. A low chowki covered with an attractive red and blue Bokhara was kept under a window along the north wall of the room. On it rested a pair of tablas, a tanpura and a harmonium. Roy Choudhury was an admirer of Hindustani classical music. Even though he wasn’t formally trained in music, his perception towards it had enabled him to enjoy even the most complex subtleties of the ragas.

=== Wrestling ===
Roy Choudhury knew a fair bit about wrestling as he had learnt it from a wrestler when he was young. On the request of his students at the Madras School of Art, he agreed to teach them wrestling. An akhada (wrestling pit) was dug under the neem tree behind his studio at the school and he took care of all the expenses. Being a formidable wrestler, the students under his tutelage became more disciplined, learned some of the intricate details of the sport and its effectiveness toward achieving physical fitness.

== Death and legacy ==
Roy Choudhury died on 15 October 1975 in Madras at the age of seventy-six. He had his first solo exhibition in Kolkata in 1993 which was followed by several exhibitions in India, including Birla Academy of Art and Culture, Kolkata; Jehangir Art Gallery, Mumbai; National Gallery of Modern Art, Delhi and Lalit Kala Akademi, New Delhi, among others.

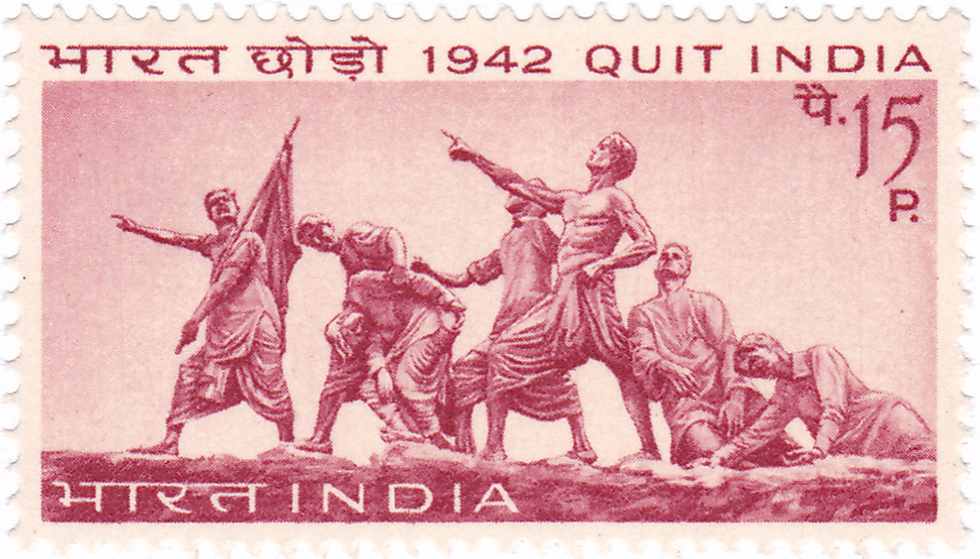
Martyrs' Memorial on the 1967 postal stamp of India

His sculpture, the Triumph of Labour featured on an Indian postage stamp to celebrate the 40th anniversary of International Labour Organization in 1959. The Martyrs’ Memorial also appeared on the Indian postal stamp to commemorate the silver jubilee of Quit India Movement in 1967.

== See also ==
- List of Lalit Kala Akademi fellows
- Abanindranath Tagore
- Bengal School of Art
- Martyrs' Memorial Patna
