= Shaheed Smarak Patna =

Memorial in Patna, India

Shaheed Smarak
- India
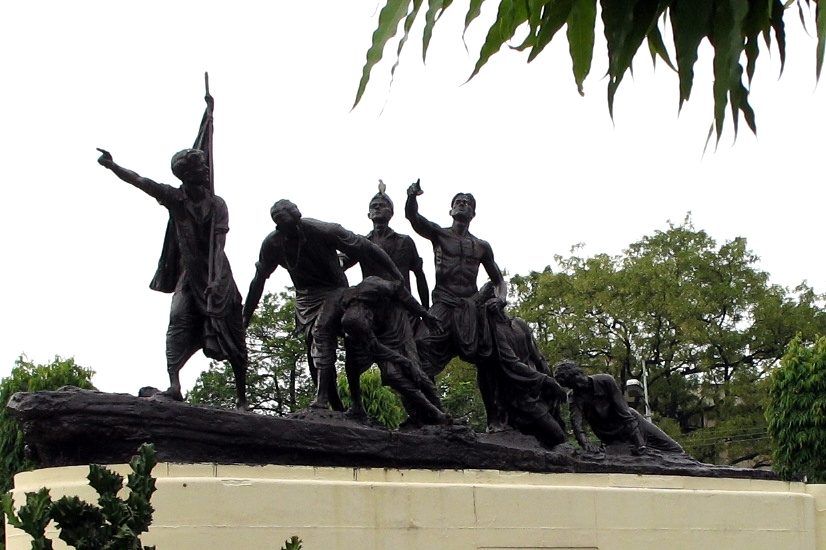
- Martyrs' Memorial in Patna
- Used for those deceased
- Established: 15 August 1947
- Location: 25°36′28.77″N 85°10′03.06″E near Patna, Bihar, India
- Designed by: Deviprasad Roychoudhury
- Commemorated: Seven brave young men

Burials by nation
- India

Burials by war
- Quit India Movement
- To the Seven brave young men who sacrificed their lives in the Quit India movement, while attempting to hoist the national flag.

The Martyrs' Memorial, also known as Shaheed Smarak, is a life-size statue of seven young men who died in the Quit India movement (August 1942), to hoist the national flag on the (now) Secretariat building. The foundation stone of Martyr's Memorial was laid on 15 August 1947, by the governor of Bihar, Mr. Jairam Das Daulatram in presence of Premier of Bihar Shri Krishna Sinha and his deputy Anugrah Narayan Sinha . The sculptor Devi Prasad Roychoudhury built the bronze statue of the seven students with the national flag. These statues were cast in Italy and later placed here.

Martyr's Memorial is now situated outside the Secretariat building in Patna.

== History ==
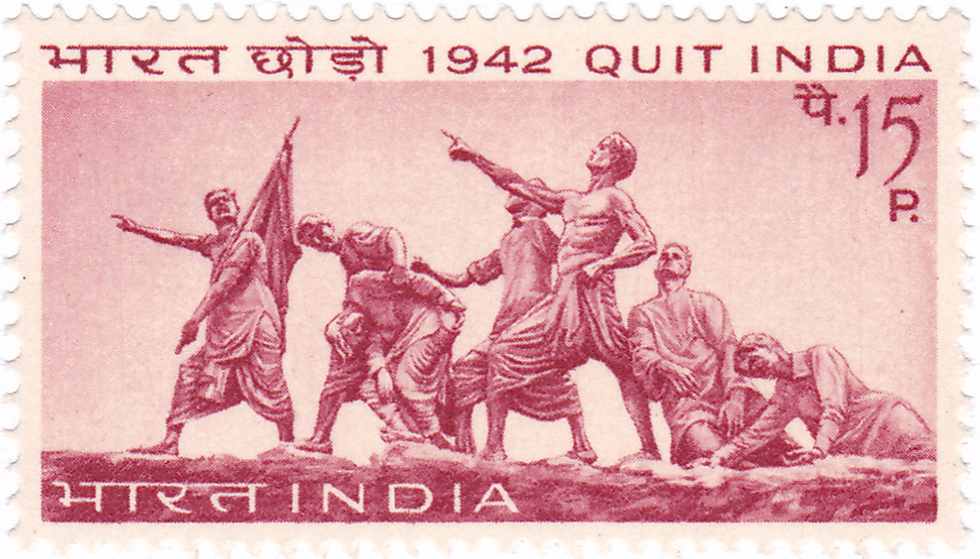
Martyr's Memorial on a 1967 stamp of India

During the height of Quit India Movement in 1942, eminent Gandhian freedom fighter Shri Krishna Sinha and Dr. Anugrah Narain was arrested while he was trying to unfurl the national flag in Patna, as a strong reaction, a group of seven young students decided to forcefully unfurl the national flag in Patna and were mercilessly shot dead by the British.

Following are the martyrs, whose names are engraved on Martyr's Memorial.

- Umakant Prasad Sinha (Raman Ji) – Ram Mohan Roy Seminary, class IX, Narendrapur, Saran
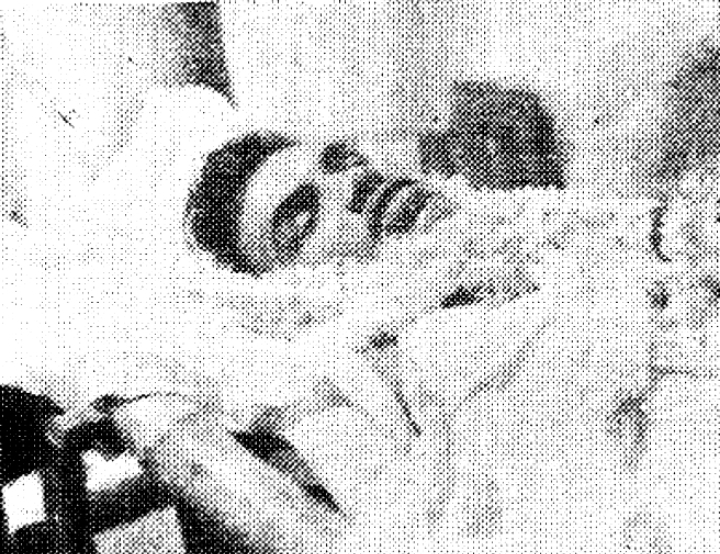
  Martyr Umakant Prasad Sinha
- Ramanand Singh – Ram Mohan Roy Seminary, class IX, Sahadat Nagar,(at present), Fazalchak Patna
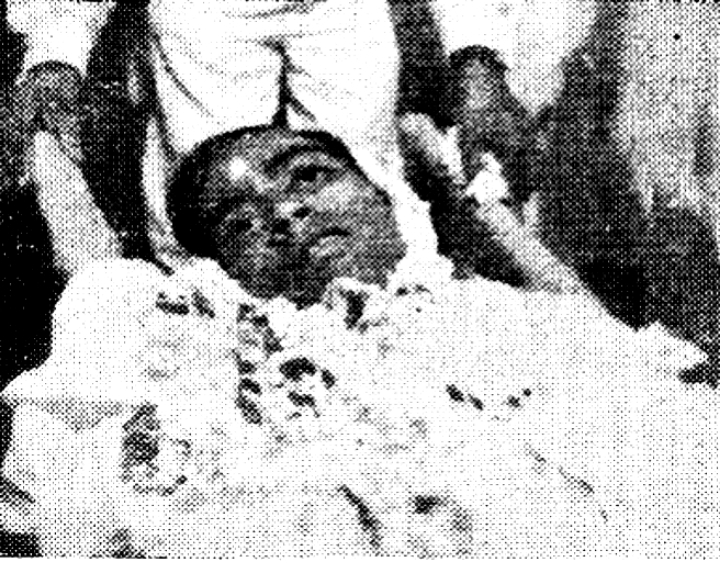
  Martyr Ramanand Singh
- Satish Chandra Jha – Patna Collegiate School, class X, Kharhara, Banka
- Jagatpati Kumar – Bihar National College, 2nd year, Kharati, Aurangabad
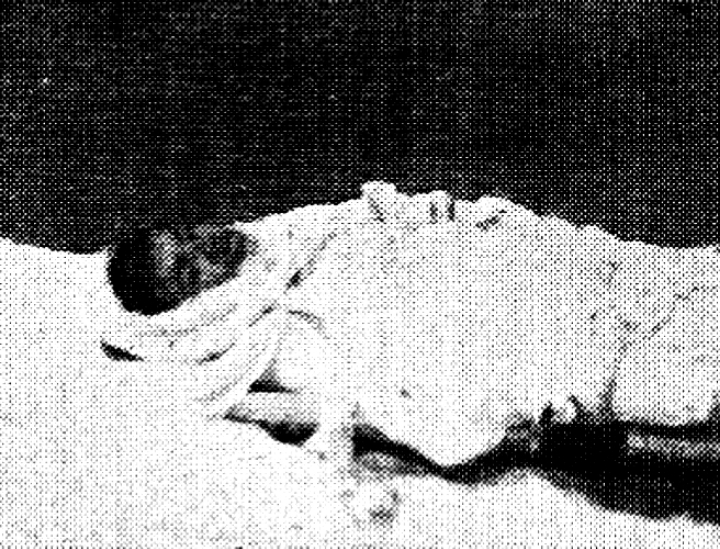
  Martyr Jagatpati Kumar
- Devipada Choudhry – Miller High English School, class IX, Silhat, Jamalpur
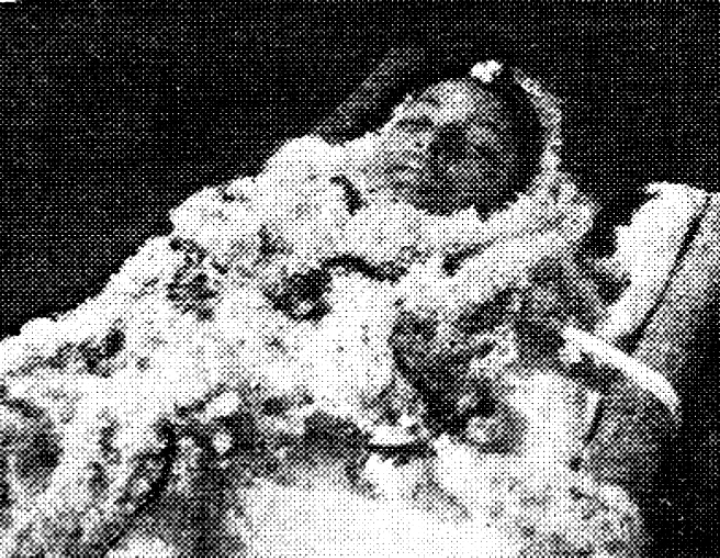
  Martyr Devipada Choudhary
- Rajendra Singh – Patna High English School, matric class, Banwari Chak, Saran, Nayagaon, Bihar
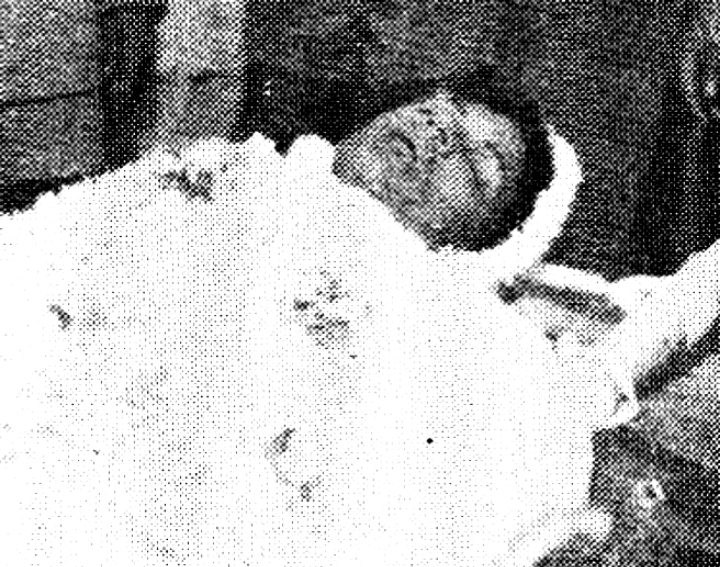
  Martyr Rajendra Singh
- Ramgovind Singh – Punpun High English School, matric class IX, Dasharatha, Patna
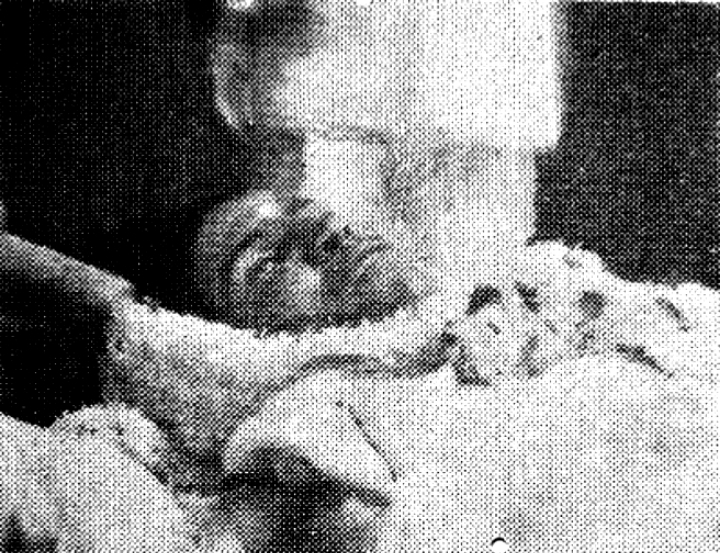
  Martyr Ramgovind Singh

== See also ==
- 1857 Shaheed Smarak Ambala
- Quit India Movement
- Gyarah Murti
