= Triumph of Labour =

Statue at the Marina Beach, Chennai, India

Coordinates: 13.064118°N 80.283714°E

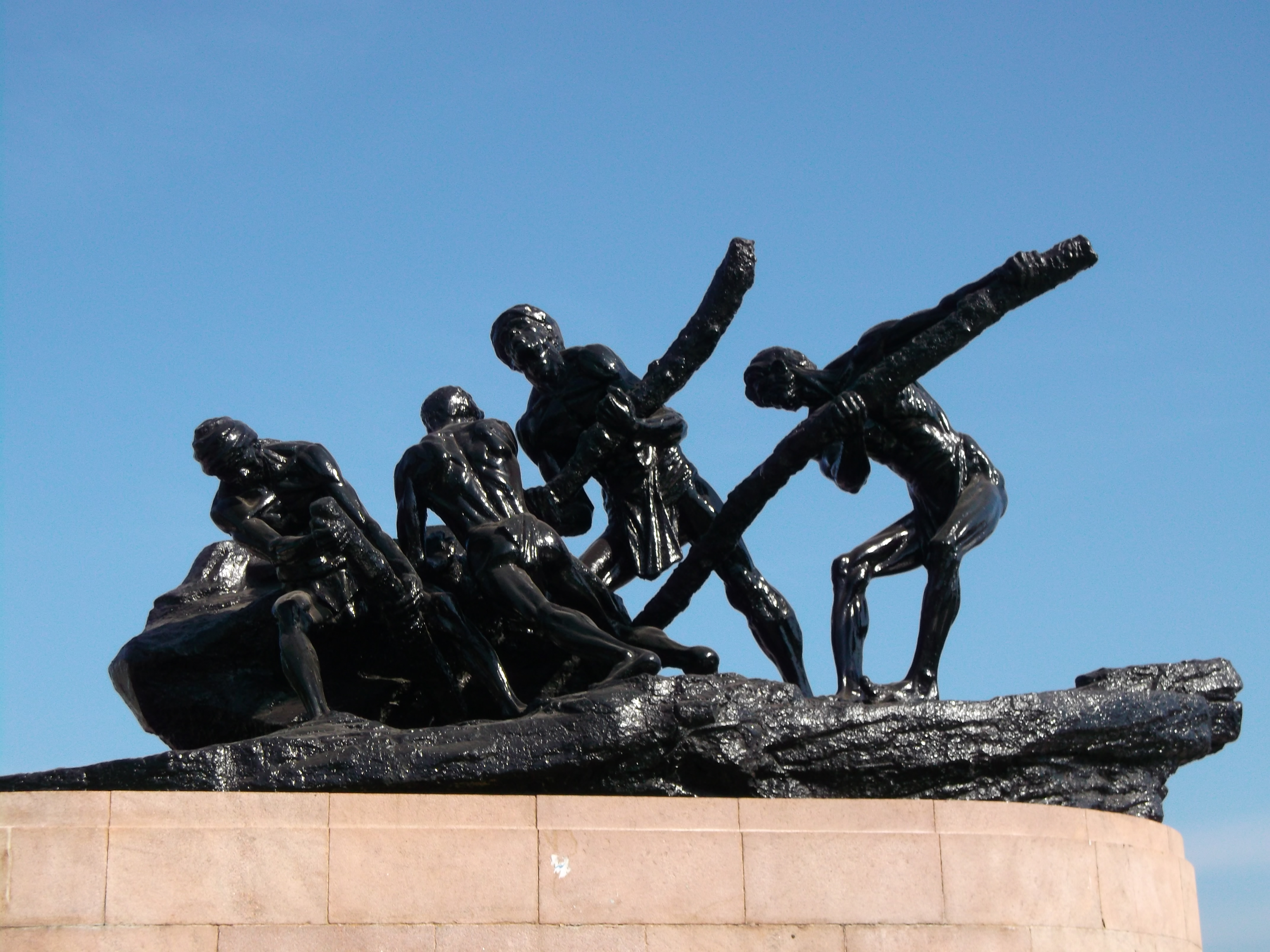
- Artist: Debi Prasad Roy Chowdhury
- Year: 1959
- Type: Statue
- Medium: Bronze
- Location: Marina Beach, Chennai

The Triumph of Labour, also known as the Labour statue, is a statue at the Marina Beach, Chennai, India. Erected at the northern end of the beach at the Anna Square opposite University of Madras, it is an important landmark of Chennai. The statue shows four men toiling to move a rock, depicting the hard work of the labouring class. It was sculpted by Debi Prasad Roy Chowdhury. The statue is the earliest among a row of statues to be erected on the beach and is installed close to the site where the country's first commemoration of May Day was held. The statue was installed on the eve of the Republic Day in 1959, as part of the Kamaraj government's drive to beautify the beach. The statue remains the focal point of May Day celebrations in the city.

== History ==
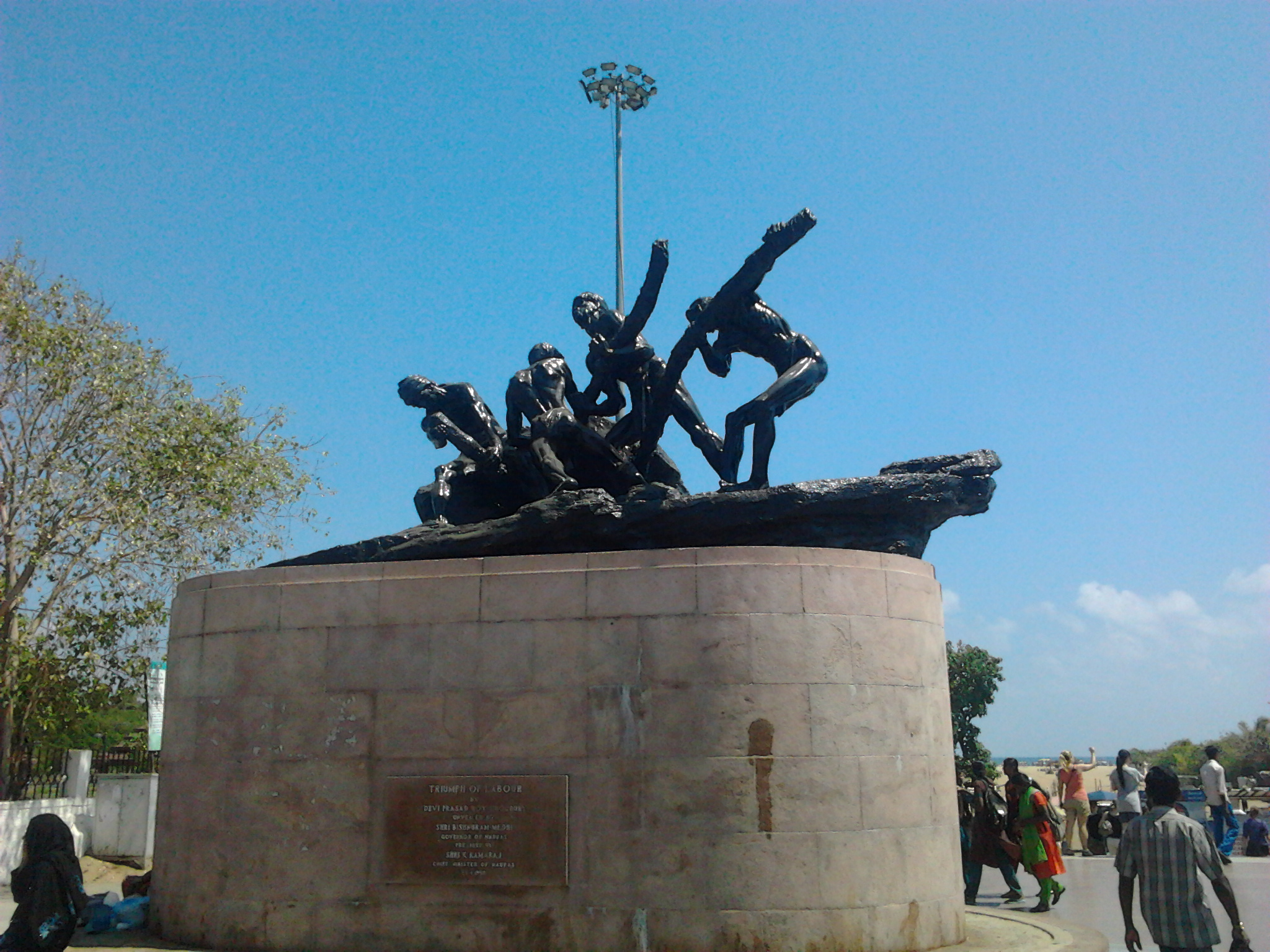
The Triumph of Labour statue

On a summer evening in May 1923, M. Singaravelu, a labour union leader, conducted a meeting at the Marina Beach near Triplicane, calling for recognition of workers' rights, and pledged to create a political party to represent the rights of labourers, which was India's first ever May Day rally. To commemorate this, the Labour statue, depicting an inspiring posture of a team of labourers engrossed at arduous work, was sculpted by Debi Prasad Roy Chowdhury, who was the first Indian principal of the then Government of Madras School of Arts and Crafts (what is today the Tamil Nadu Government College of Fine Arts) and was erected on 25 January 1959, unveiled by the then Governor of Madras, Bishnuram Medhi.

Historical accounts and family records indicate that artist C. L. S. Mani and his classmate S. Dhanapal, both of whom studied under D. P. Roy Chowdhury at the Government School of Arts and Crafts, Madras, posed as models during the statue's development over several years, before its unveiling on 25 January 1959. Their participation reflects Roy Chowdhury's practice of working with multiple models to realise his artistic vision, rather than relying exclusively on any single individual.

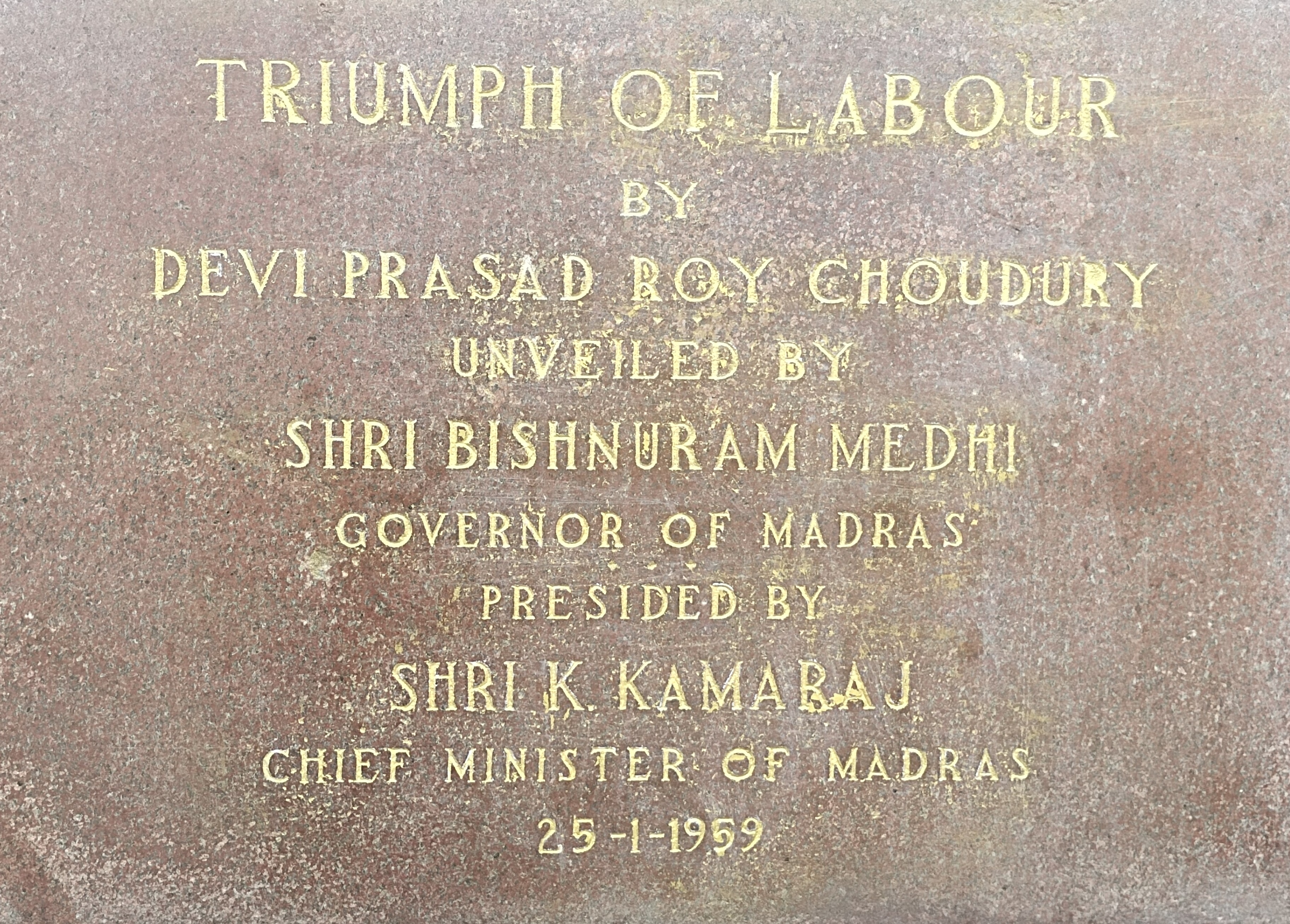
Plaque on the Triumph of Labour statue

== See also ==
- Marina Beach
