= Sachiwalay Halt railway station =

Railway station in Bihar, India

SACHIWALAY HALT
- Indian Railways logo

General information
- Location: Harding Road, Gardanibagh, Patna, Bihar; India
- Coordinates: 25.5958°N 85.1169°E
- Elevation: 58 metres (190 ft)
- System: Indian Railways station
- Owner: Indian Railways
- Operator: East Central Railway
- Platforms: 2
- Tracks: 4
- Connections: Auto stand

Construction
- Structure type: Standard (on-ground station)
- Parking: No
- Cycle facilities: No

Other information
- Status: Functioning
- Station code: SCY
- Zone(s): East Central Railway
- Division(s): Danapur

Services
Preceding station	Indian Railways	Following station
Phulwari Sharif towards ?	East Central Railway zone Danapur–Patna section	Patna Junction towards ?
Location
- Location within Patna Location within Bihar Location within India
- Interactive map of Sachiwalay Halt

Sachiwalay Halt railway station (station code: SCY) is a railway station in Patna district, in the Indian state of Bihar. It serves Patna city. The station consists of two platforms.
