= Rajiv Nagar railway station =

Railway station in Bihar

General information
- Location: Boring Road, Patliputra Colony, Rajeev Nagar, Patna, Bihar; India
- Coordinates: 25.6313°N 85.0998°E
- Elevation: 55 metres (180 ft)
- System: Indian Railways station
- Owner: Indian Railways
- Operator: East Central Railway
- Platforms: 1
- Tracks: 4
- Connections: Auto stand

Construction
- Structure type: Standard (on-ground station)
- Parking: No
- Cycle facilities: No

Other information
- Status: Not functioning
- Station code: RVN
- Zone(s): East Central Railway
- Division(s): Danapur

Services
Preceding station	Indian Railways	Following station
Shivpuri towards ?	East Central Railway zone Patna–Digha Ghat section	Digha Ghat towards ?
Location
- Location within India Location within Bihar

Rajiv Nagar railway station (station code: RVN) is a small railway station in Patna district, in the Indian state of Bihar. It serves Patna city. The station consists of one platform.
