= Daroga Prasad Rai Path =

Daroga Prasad Rai Path Serpentine Road
- Neighbourhood/Street
- Location in Patna, India
- Coordinates: 25°36′19″N 85°7′20″E
- Country: India
- State: Bihar
- Metro: Patna

Languages
  - Spoken: Hindi, English
- Time zone: UTC+5:30 (IST)
- PIN: 800001
- Planning agency: Bihar Urban Infrastructure Development Corporation
- Civic agency: Patna Municipal Corporation

Daroga Prasad Rai Path, formerly Serpentine Road, is a major thoroughfare, which runs through the upscale part of Western Patna in India. Daroga Prasad Rai Path is a residential street, which connects Hartali Mor and Beer Chand Patel Marg. The area is served by Shastrinagar Police Station under Patna Police. It is named after Daroga Prasad Rai, the former chief minister of Bihar.

== Landmarks/Nearby places ==
- R Block ~0.3 km
- Bihar Museum ~0.3 km
- 60 Officers' Flat ~0.5 km
- Government Quarters- Officer's Flat ~0.5 km
- Lake ~0.6 km
- Mount Carmel High School ~0.7 km
- Eco Park ~0.8 km
- 12 Bailey Road ~0.9 km
- Punaichak 1 km
- A N College professors colony ~1.3 km
- Patna High Court
