= Bailey Road railway station =

Railway station in Bihar

General information
- Location: Bailey Road, Patna, Bihar; India
- Coordinates: 25.6066°N 85.1171°E
- Elevation: 58 metres (190 ft)
- System: Indian Railways station
- Owner: Indian Railways
- Operator: East Central Railway
- Platforms: 1
- Tracks: 1
- Connections: Auto stand

Construction
- Structure type: Standard (on-ground station)
- Parking: No
- Cycle facilities: No

Other information
- Status: Defunct
- Station code: BRHT
- Zone(s): East Central Railway
- Division(s): Danapur

Services
Preceding station	Indian Railways	Following station
Old Sachdeva towards ?	East Central Railway zone Patna–Digha Ghat section	Punaichak towards ?
Location

Bailey Road railway station is a small railway station in Patna district, Bihar. Its code is BRHT. It serves Patna city. The station consists of 1 platforms.
