= Hardinge Park =

Park in Patna, India

Coordinates: 25°36′05″N 85°07′45″E

Shaheed Veer Kunwar Singh Azadi Park
- Hardinge Park
- Interactive map of Shaheed Veer Kunwar Singh Azadi Park
- Type: Public Park
- Location: Patna, Bihar, India
- Area: 22 acres (8.9 ha)
- Created: 31 January 1916; 110 years ago
- Status: Open year round

Hardinge Park officially known as Shaheed Veer Kunwar Singh Azadi Park is a public park in the city of Patna built by British Raj in 1916. The park was initially named after Viceroy Charles Hardinge and was built in his honour as he was instrumental in the creation of Bihar as a separate province. It was built as Patna's first public park. The park is located midway between Patna Junction and the Bihar Secretariat. The name was changed to Shaheed Veer Kunwar Singh Azadi Park post independence. The park also hosted a garden party for then Prince of Wales - Edward VIII - in 1921 on his visit to Patna. The park completed its centenary in 2016. It is known as the old bus stand. Indian Railways is soon going to construct Suburban Rail Terminal at Hardinge Park which is barely 900 metres west from Patna Junction.

== History ==
On 28 September 1913, the Hardinge Memorial Committee was constituted by the state authorities to design and set up a park in Patna. A deed of grant was signed between the Patna collector and the Hardinge Memorial Committee on 8 September 1915 for development of a public park as Hardinge Park to be maintained by the committee. The Park was officially opened to the public on 31 January 1916 by the then Lieutenant-Governor of Bihar and Orissa, Edward Albert Gait. It was built in honour of Charles Hardinge, 1st Baron Hardinge of Penshurst and was named after him.

At the opening of the Park Lt Governor had also unveiled a 5 tonne life-size bronze statue of Lord Hardinge. The statue was created by renowned British sculptor Herbert Hampton in London. After protests in late 1960s the statue was removed from the park and placed in Patna Museum. It was installed again in the 1990s on a platform in a corner of the Patna Museum's lawns. In late 2017, one of the last remnants of the British Raj-era landmark - the pedestal on which the Hardinge's iconic bronze statue once stood, was also demolished.

The park was also the location of Garden party for then Prince of Wales - Edward VIII - during his Patna visit in 1921. The party was hosted by Bihar Landholders' Association led by Maharaja of Darbhanga.

The park is one of the oldest parks in the city of Patna. The name of the park was changed to Shaheed Veer Kunwar Singh Azadi Park after Kunwar Singh who was a notable leader during the Indian Rebellion of 1857. The park used to be the location of Flower Shows in Patna for many years.

== Design and Location ==
The park is located on north of Hardinge Road and Delhi-Howrah railway line in east–west direction. It is spread over an area of 22 acres and is somewhat triangular in shape. The park is dotted with ornamental fountains and perpendicular pathways are present across the area of the park.

== Suburban Rail Terminal ==
The park was not well maintained by the government and was in a state of neglect. It had been used as a landfill and garbage dump by the Patna Municipal corporation for years. The Bihar government driven by High Court directives, redeveloped the space to convert the former landfill into a modern public park. The renovated park includes landscaped green areas, a jogging track, musical fountains, and a small boating area.

Indian Railways is also going to build four platforms on the Hardinge Park side of Patna junction to facilitate smooth running of mainline-electric-multiple-unit (MEMU) trains. There will be two pairs of double-discharge (DD) platform. Indian Railways has proposed to terminate and originate all its local passenger trains from the DD platforms. Indian Railways got around 1.9-hectare (4.8-acre) of land on Hardinge Road from Bihar government in lieu of the 7 km long Patna–Digha Ghat line land it offered to the latter for the construction of R-Block-Digha Road.

== See also ==
- Patna–Digha Ghat line
- Mithapur, Patna
- Chennai Suburban Terminal
- Patna Junction railway station
- Coronation Park, Delhi
