= Patna Secretariat =

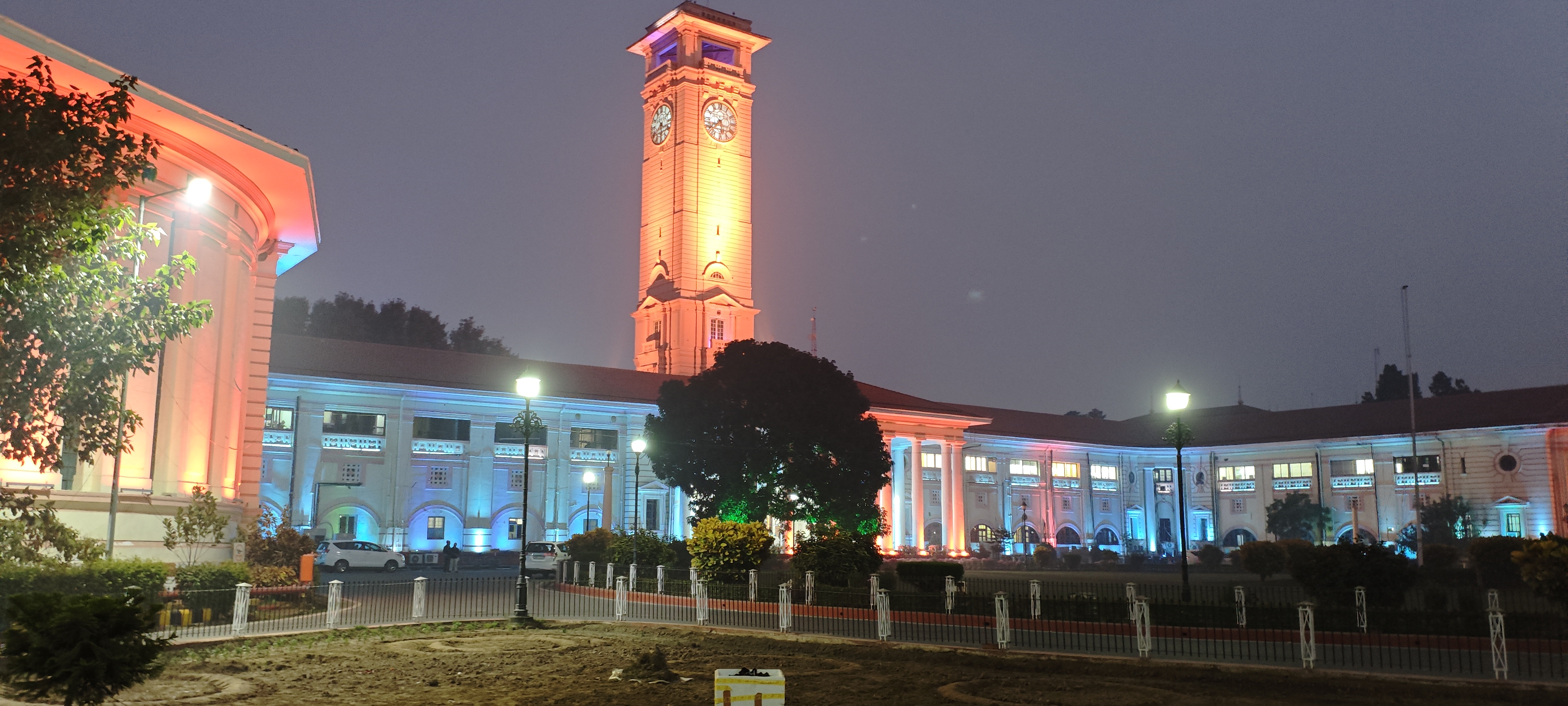

- Location within Patna Location within India Location within Bihar
- Alternative names: Old Secretariat

General information
- Type: Government building
- Architectural style: Indo-Sarcenic Style
- Location: Old Secretariat, Hardinge Road, Patna, Bihar, India
- Coordinates: 25.599°N 85.117°E
- Construction started: 1913
- Completed: 1917
- Owner: Government of Bihar

Design and construction
- Architect: Joseph P. Munnings
- Developer: Martin Burn

Website
- https://state.bihar.gov.in

Patna Secretariat, also known as Patna Sachivalaya or Old Secretariat, is the administrative headquarters of the state Government of Bihar in India. It is located in Bihar's capital city of Patna. This building is situated between two iconic buildings of the city, Lok Bhavan in the west and Patna High Court in the far east.

== Location, architecture and design ==
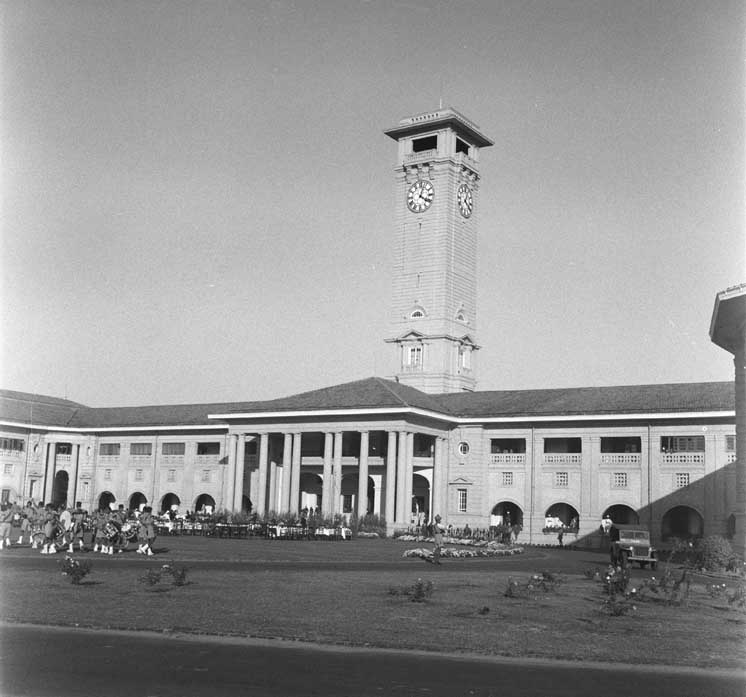
Old picture from Ministry of Information and Broadcasting (India)

Patna Secretariat is a mighty Victorian construction located to the east of the Raj Bhavan in Patna. Built by the British in the Indo-Sarcenic style, it was completed in 1917. It is 716 feet long 364 feet wide and remains one of the largest government buildings of the city. A huge clock tower stands tall amidst the beautiful and green lawn of the place. Originally, it was 198 feet high, but a part of it fell down during the 1934 Nepal–Bihar earthquake. Currently, its height is 184 feet from the ground. A four-foot gap left between the concrete ceiling and the outer covering of tiles from Raniganj ensures a reasonable temperature in the interiors during the hot season.

The campus has lawns and other remarkable things, such as bronze statue of the first Chief Minister of Bihar, Bihar Kesari Srikrishna Sinha to the west of Lawn and the Martyr's memorial to commemorate the sacrifice of seven students during 1942 August Kranti movement.

Patna Secretariat Building is one of the remarkable buildings of the city of Patna, known for its architectural splendor. It was designed by the famous architect of Sydney, Joseph Munnings and built by Martin Burn of Calcutta during 1913–17. It stands distinct from any other historical building of the city by its tall clock tower. Today, this is the Secretariat of Bihar State Government. It is a bustling center with all types of government activities. All the important government departments, such as Home, Finance, General Administration, Cabinet Secretariat etc. are situated here so do the office of the ministers and the bureaucrats.
