= List of largest Hindu ashrams =

This is a list of largest Hindu ashrams in terms of area.

Rank	Name of the ashram	Photo	Area (m^{2})	Place	Country	Notes
1	The Art of Living International Center		1,011,714	Bangalore	India	The Art of Living International Center is the headquarter of the Art of Living Foundation. The center is located 21 km southwest of Bangalore on Kanakapura road, at the top of the Panchagiri Hills. It is connected by Road via Nice Ring Road or Banshankari - Kanakpura Road.
2	Adiyogi Shiva		607,020	Velliangiri Mountains	India	Isha Foundation's headquarters are located in an ashram built on the foothills of the Velliangiri Mountains, adjacent to the Nilgiri Biosphere Reserve, some forty kilometres from the city of Coimbatore in the state of Tamil Nadu, South India.
3	Mata Amritanandamayi Math		404,686	Kollam	India	The Mata Amritanandamayi Math (MAM) is an international charitable organization aimed at the spiritual and material upliftment of humankind. It was founded by spiritual leader and humanitarian Mata Amritanandamayi in 1981, with its headquarters in Paryakadavu, Alappad Panchayat, Kollam district, Kerala.
4	Osho International Meditation Resort		161,874	Pune	India	In 1990, Rajneesh died and was buried at the ashram in Poona; which became the Osho International Meditation Resort.
5	Sri Aurobindo Ashram		38,080	Pondicherry	India	The Sri Aurobindo Ashram is a spiritual community (ashram) located in Pondicherry, in the Indian territory of Puducherry. The ashram grew out of a small community of disciples who had gathered around Sri Aurobindo after he retired from politics and settled in Pondicherry in 1910. On 24 November 1926, after a major spiritual realization, Sri Aurobindo withdrew from public view in order to continue his spiritual work. At this time he handed over the full responsibility for the inner and outer lives of the sadhaks (spiritual aspirants) and the ashram to his spiritual collaborator, "the Mother", earlier known as Mirra Alfassa. This date is therefore generally known as the founding-day of the ashram, though, as Sri Aurobindo himself wrote, it had “less been created than grown around him as its centre.”

== See also ==
- List of tallest gopurams
- List of largest temple tanks
- List of human stampedes in Hindu temples
- Lists of Hindu temples by country
- List of largest Hindu temples
