= List of Hindu temples in Germany =

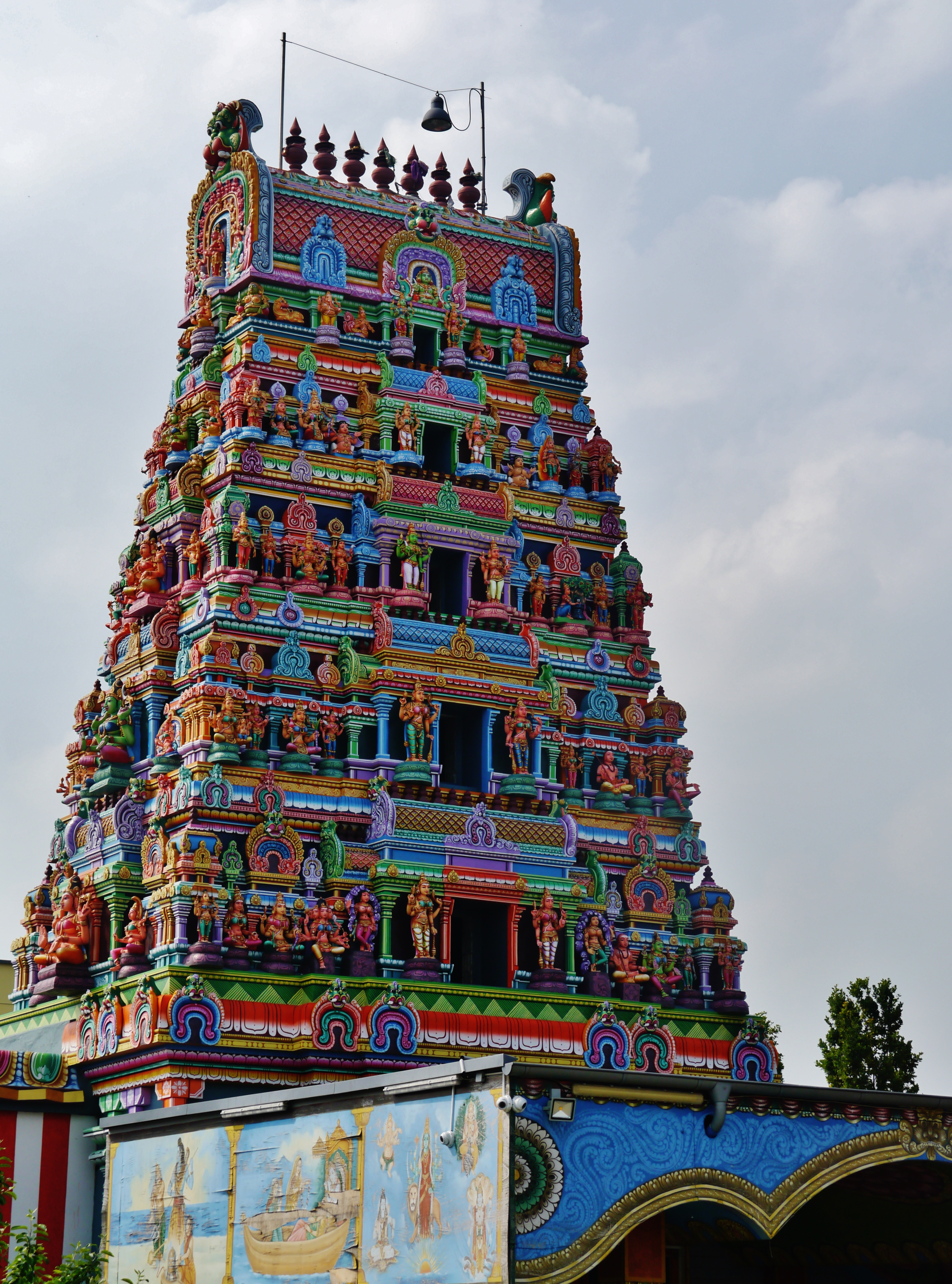
Sri Kamadchi Ampal Temple in Hamm is the largest Hindu temple in Germany

This is a List of Hindu temples in Germany sorted by state.

== Baden-Wüttemberg ==
- Heilbronn Kanthasamy Kovil, Siemensstraße 11, Bad Friedrichshall
- Sri Sithi Vinayagar Kovil e.V., Stuttgart
- Sri Balamurugan Temple, Stuttgart
- Sri Meenadchi Ambal Temple, Backnang
- Sri Nagapoosani Amman Aalayam, Pforzheim
- Vedische Kultur Zentrum e.V., Giebel, Stuttgart
- Shri Sithi Vinayagar Tempel Singen, Gottmadingen

== Bavaria ==
- Sivaalayam (based on Siva Panchayatanam), Munich
- Sri Pillaiyar Temple, Munich
- ISKCON München, Munich
- Hari Om Temple, Munich
- Sri Sithivinayagar Temple, Nürnberg
- ISKCON Jandelsbrunn Simhachalam Temple, Jandelsbrunn
- Shiva Vishnu Temple, Fürth

== Berlin ==
- Ramayan Hari Krishna Temple, Berlin
- Sri Ganesha Temple, Berlin
- Jagannath-Tempel Berlin (ISKCON), Berliner Allee 209, Berlin-Weißensee
- Mayoorapathy Sri Murugan Temple, Blaschkoallee 48, Berlin
- Sri Gauranga und Giriraja Govardhana Temple, Invalidenstraße, Berlin
- Pura Tri Hita Karana, a Balinese temple
- Vedanta Society of Berlin

== Bremen ==
- Bremen Sri Varasiththivinayakar Tempel e.V, Ilse-Kaisen-Straße 24, Bremen
- Sai Baba Temple, Flämische Straße 4, Bremen

== Hessen ==
- Karpaga Vinayagar Temple, Intze-Straße 26, Frankfurt
- Sri Nagapooshani Amman Thevasthaanam Hinduistischer Kulturverein Inthumantram Frankfurt am Main
- Sri Shirdi Sai Baba Temple, Anton-Burger-Weg 44, Frankfurt
- Shree Peetha Nilaya, Bhakti Marga Temple, Heidenrod-Springen (near Wiesbaden)
- Sri Vitthal Dham, Bhakti Marga Temple, Kirchheim (near Fulda)
- Vishwa Hindu Parisahd e.V., Frankfurt
- ISKCON Wiesbaden, Wiesbaden (Hessen)
- Hari Om Temple HCC e.V., Morsestraße 32, Frankfurt am Main
- Sri Mayapur Seva Ashram (Vedic Cultural Association e.V.) ‒ Forsthausweg 1, Wald-Michelbach (Hessen)

== Nordrhein-Westfalen ==
- Manawa Bharti Temple, Lenaustraße 01, Düsseldorf
- Kathirvelayuthaswamy Temple, Klosterstraße, Essen
- Sri-Kurinjikumaran-Temple, Industriestraße, Gummersbach
- Sri-Kamadchi-Ampal-Temple, Siegenbeckstraße, Hamm
- Sri Venkateswara Perumal Temple e.V., Hamm
- Sri Sithivinayagar Temple, Ferdinand-Poggel-Straße, Hamm
- Thiru Nallur Sri Arumukan Velalakan Murukan Temple, Roonstraße, Hamm
- ISKCON Köln e.V., Bhakti-Yoga-Zentrum Gauradesh, Köln
- Sri Saanthanayaki Samethe Chandramouleeswarar Temple, Kiefer-Straße 24, Dortmund
- Tamilengemeinde Krefeld
- Kultureller Verein afghanischer Hindus in Deutschland, Burggrafenstraße 10, Essen
- Sri Muthumariamman Temple, Christian-Lassen-Straße 6, Bonn
- Hari Om Mandir, Wikinger Straße 62, Köln

== Niedersachsen ==
- Sri Muthumariamman Temple, Carl-Buderus-Str. 3A, Hannover
- Sri Shankara Narayana Hindu Peedam, Braunschweig, Saarbrückener Str. 252 B, 38116 Braunschweig

== Rhineland-Palatinate ==
- ISKCON Goloka Dhama Verein e.V., Böckingstraße 4a, Abentheuer

== Saarland ==
- Sri Mahamariamman Temple, Sulzbach-Altenwald

== Gallery ==
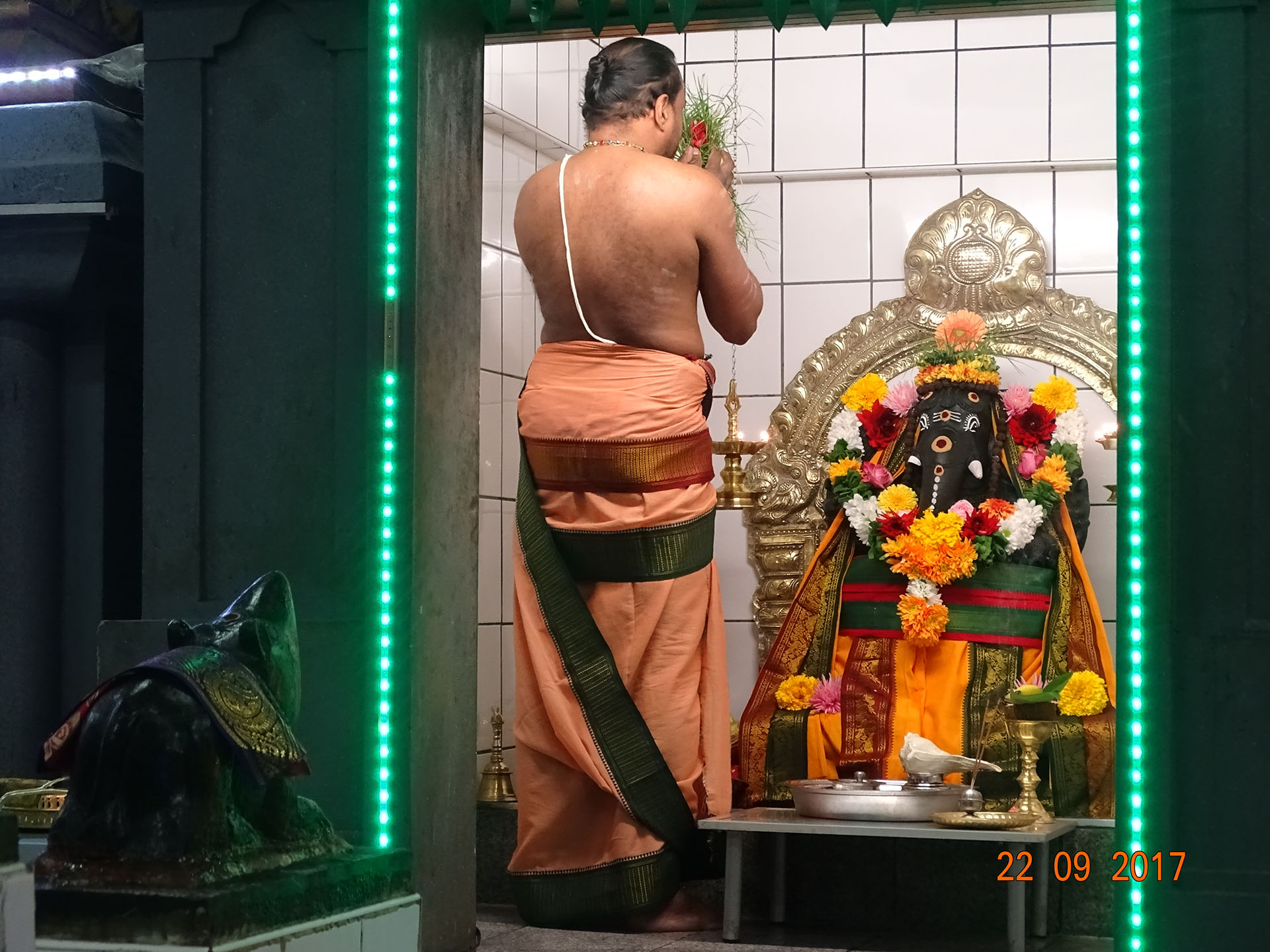
Sri Sithi Vinayagar

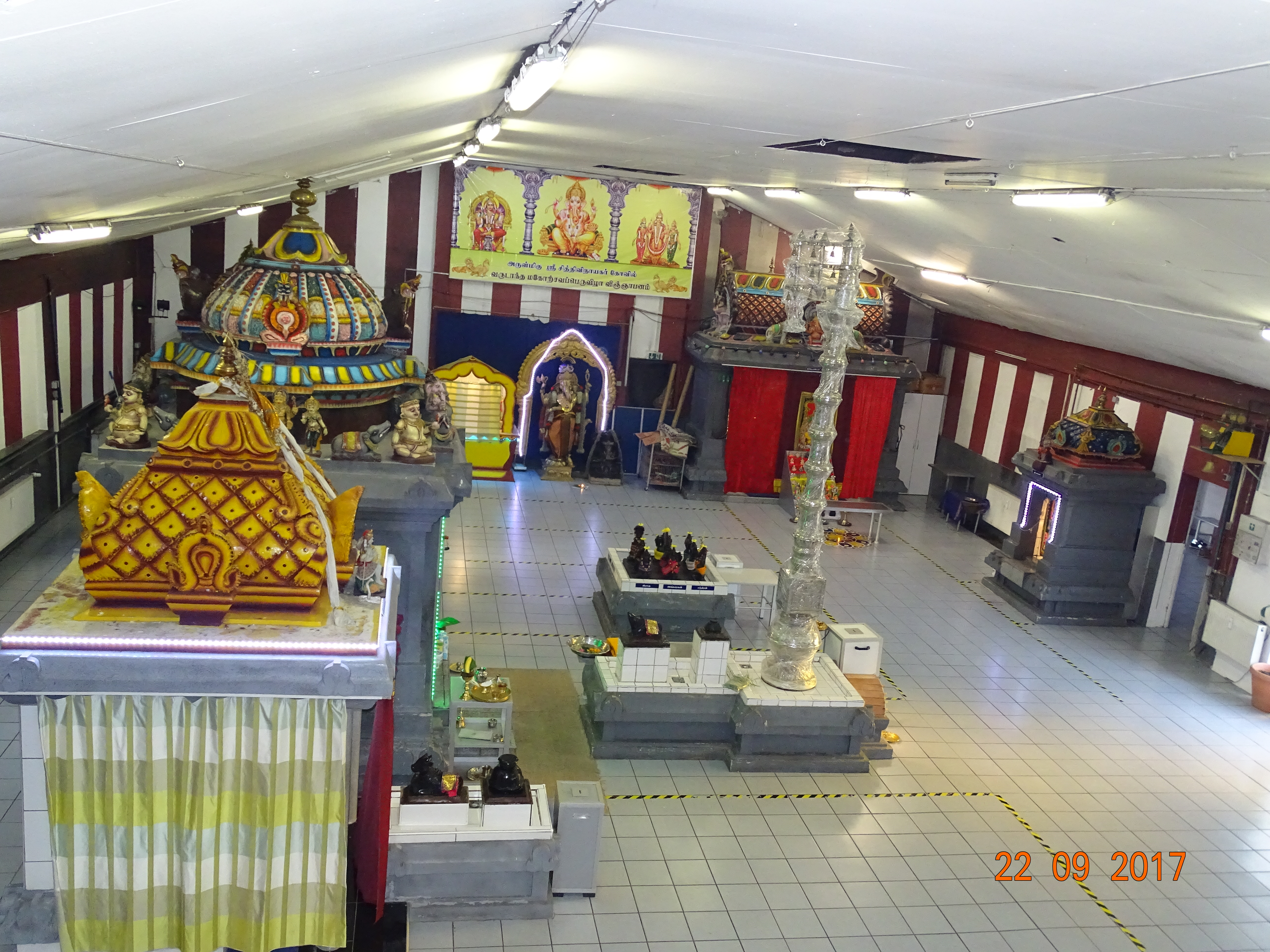
Kovil General View

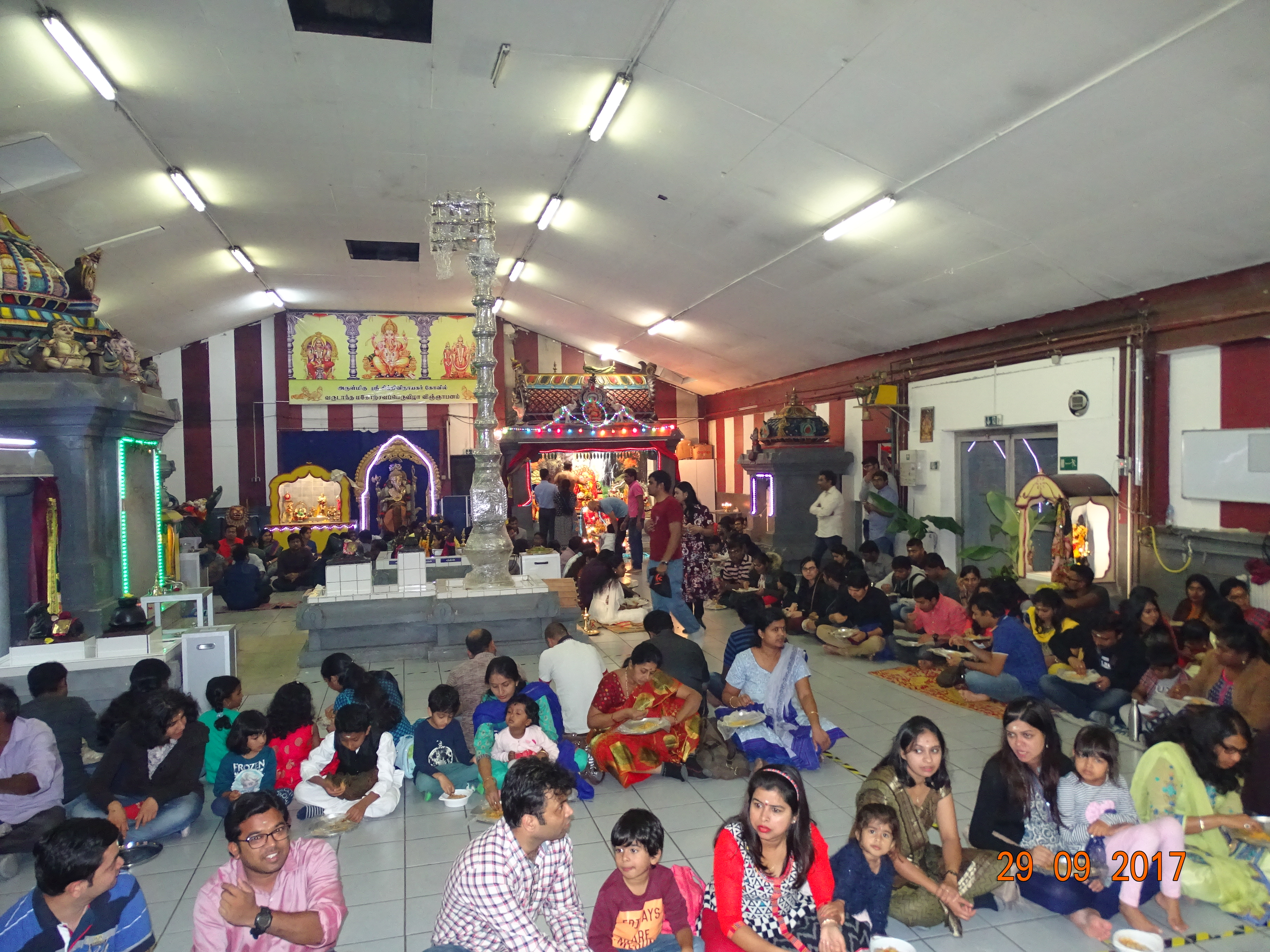
Every Friday with Annathanam

== See also ==
- Lists of Hindu temples
- List of Hindu temples outside India
- List of large Hindu temples
- Hinduism in Germany
