= Lists of Hindu temples =

This is a list of lists of Hindu temples. List is in alphabetical order in three types: based on geographic locations and by continents; by theme; and by prime deity.

== By location ==
=== Africa ===
- List of Hindu temples in Mauritius
- List of Hindu temples in South Africa
- List of Hindu temples in Tanzania

=== Asia ===
- List of Hindu temples in Afghanistan
  - List of Hindu temples of Kabul
- List of Hindu temples in Bangladesh
- List of Hindu temples in Cambodia
- List of Hindu temples in Pakistan
- List of Hindu temples in India
- By state:
  - List of Hindu temples in Andhra Pradesh
    - List of Hindu temples in Tirupati
  - List of Hindu temples in Bihar
  - List of Hindu temples in Goa
  - List of Hindu temples in Kerala
    - Goud Saraswat Brahmin temples in Kerala
  - List of Hindu temples in Tamil Nadu
    - List of temples in Kanchipuram
    - List of Hindu temples in Kumbakonam
  - Temples of Telangana
  - List of temples in Uttarakhand
- By non-states:
  - List of Hindu temples in Bareilly
  - List of Chola temples in Bangalore
  - List of Hindu temples in Bhubaneswar
  - List of Hindu temples in Bishnupur
  - List of temples in Tulu Nadu
- List of Hindu temples in Indonesia
- List of Hindu temples in Japan
- List of Hindu temples in Laos
- List of Hindu temples in Malaysia
- List of Hindu temples in Mongolia
- List of Hindu temples in Nepal
- List of Hindu temples in Myanmar
- List of Hindu temples in Pakistan
  - List of temples in Lahore
  - List of Hindu temples in Multan
  - List of Hindu temples in Sindh
- List of Hindu temples in Philippines
- List of Hindu temples in Singapore
- List of Hindu temples in South Korea
- List of Hindu temples in Sri Lanka
- List of Hindu temples in Thailand
- List of Hindu temples in Vietnam

=== Europe ===
- List of Hindu temples in England
- List of Hindu temples in France
- List of Hindu temples in Germany
- List of Hindu temples in Poland
- List of Hindu temples in Switzerland
- List of Hindu temples in the United Kingdom

=== North America ===
- List of Hindu temples in the United States
- List of Hindu temples in Canada
- List of Hindu temples in Trinidad and Tobago

=== South America ===
- List of Hindu temples in Guyana

== By architectural or other features ==
- Biggest
  - List of largest Hindu temples
  - List of largest temple tanks
  - List of tallest gopurams
  - List of largest Hindu ashrams
- Caves and rocks
  - List of rock-cut temples in India

== By prime deity ==
- List of Hindu deities
- Rigvedic deities
  - Sun worship in Hinduism
    - List of solar deities in Hinduism
    - List of Sun temples in Hinduism
- Jyotisha
  - Nakshatra
    - Saptarishi
    - List of Natchathara temples
  - Navagraha
    - List of Navagraha temples
    - Adityas
      - List of Sun temples in Hinduism
      - Surya Namaskar
    - Chandra
    - Ardha Chandrasana
      - List of Chandra temples
    - Shani
      - List of Shani temples
- Shaivism
  - Char Dham
  - Chota Char Dham
  - 64 original Jyotirlinga
  - List of 12 Maha Jyotirlinga
  - List of 108 Shiva Temples
  - List of Bhairava temples
  - List of Ganesha temples
  - List of Shiva temples in India
  - List of Indus Valley Civilization sites (Proto-haivism and Proto-Shaktism)
- Shaktism
  - List of 51 Shakti Pitha
  - List of Mansa Devi temples
  - List of Shakta pithas in Bengal
  - List of Indus Valley Civilization sites (Proto-haivism and Proto-Shaktism)
- Vaishnavism
  - 108 Divya desam
  - Char Dham
- Worship of sacred objects:
  - Sacred rivers
    - Rigvedic rivers
    - Sapta Sindhu
    - Triveni Sangam of Ganga, Yamuna, and Sarasvati rivers.
    - Narmada
  - Sacred groves of India
    - List of largest sacred Banyan trees in India
    - Triveni, Panchvati and sacred plants and flowers in Hinduism
  - Sacred mountains of Hinduism
    - Mount Kailash
    - Sarasvatotri mountain
    - Gangotri mountain
    - Yamunotri mountain
    - Dhosi Hill (where Chyavanprash originated)
    - Nanda Devi
    - Om Parvat
    - Saraswati Parbat I
    - Saraswati Parbat II
  - Sacred pre-historic megaliths of India
    - Sacred dolmens of India
    - Sacred menhirs of India

== See also ==
- Hindu eschatology
- Hindu pilgrimage sites
- Hindu temple architecture
- List of Hindu temples outside India
- Sapta Puri, seven holy pilgrimage centres in India
- Tarapith temple
- Yatra, a Hindu pilgrimage
