= List of tallest gopurams =

A gopuram (or gopura) is a monumental tower, usually ornate, at the entrance of any temple, especially in Southern India. They are a prominent feature of koils, Hindu temples built in the Dravidian style. They are topped by the kalasham, a bulbous stone finial. They function as gateways through the walls that surround the temple complex.

The gopuram's origins can be traced back to early structures built under the south Indian kings of the vijaynagara, Pallava and Chola dynasties. By the twelfth century, during the Pandya dynasty, these gateways became a dominant feature of a temple's outer appearance, eventually overshadowing the inner sanctuary which became obscured from view by the gopuram's colossal size. It also dominated the inner sanctum in amount of ornamentation. Often a shrine has more than one gopuram.

A koil may have multiple gopurams, typically constructed into multiple walls in tiers around the main shrine.

== Tallest Gopurams ==
Gopurams are widespread in south Indian temples, predominantly in Tamil Nadu. Very tall gopurams are a later feature, added from the Middle Ages onwards, typically to much older temples.

Rank	Temple	Image	Height ft	Construction Year	Notes	Location
1	Murdeshwara Temple		249.5	2008 AD	Murdeshwara Temple is known for its colossal, 40m high statue of Shiva. Its gopuram is the tallest in the world. It is also the only one where one can take a lift to top floor of the gopuram.	Murdeshwar, Karnataka, India
2	Ranganathaswamy Temple, Raja Gopuram		239.501	Started at 1700 AD and completed at 1987 AD	Ranganathaswamy Temple is the largest temple complex in India, covering an area of 156 acres (63 ha). It is home to twelve gopurams, the largest being the Raja Gopuram, built by the 44th jeeyar of ahobila mutt. Srirangam also known is worlds largest Divyadesam temple (156acres).	Srirangam, Tiruchirappalli, Tamil Nadu, India
3	Annamalaiyar Temple; East Gopuram (Raja Gopuram)		216.5	9th century AD; gopuram 16th century	Annamalaiyar Temple covers 10 hectares, and is one of the largest temples in India. It is surrounded by four large unpainted gopurams, one facing each cardinal direction. The eastern gopuram rises to 66m, and is called the Raja Gopuram.	Tiruvannamalai, Tamil Nadu, India
4	Srivilliputhur Andal Temple		196	10th–16th centuries AD	Srivilliputhur Andal Temple's gopuram measures eleven storeys high and 59m tall, making it the tallest of its era. During the Madurai Nayak dynasty, lesser figures sponsored religious projects, including the large scale campus. The temple is the emblem of the Government of Tamil Nadu.	Srivilliputhur, Tamil Nadu, India
5	Ulagalantha Perumal Temple		192	9th century AD	Ulagalantha Perumal Temple is dedicated to Trivikrama, the fifth incarnation of Vishnu.It is one of the 108 Divya Desams dedicated to Vishnu, who is worshipped as Ulagalantha Perumal and his consort Lakshmi as Poongothai. Its gopuram is 194 feet (59 m) in height.	Tirukoilur, Tamil Nadu, India
6	Ekambareswarar Temple		190	AD	Ekambareswarar Temple is the one of largest temple in Kanchipuram, a highly visible symbol of Pallava dynasty. The entire complex covers an area of 10 hectares and has five courtyards.	Kanchipuram, Tamil Nadu, India
7	Varadharaja Perumal Temple, Eastern Tower	[]	180	AD	24 acres Varadharaja Perumal Temple is located in Kanchi Perarulalan Koyil, and is dedicated to Vishnu/Perumal. This temples Chariot is Biggest Chariot of the City. The entire complex covers an area of 10 hectares and has five courtyards Located in Kanchipuram also its the temple city of Tamil Nadu.	Kanchipuram, Tamil Nadu, India
8	Kasi Viswanathar temple, Tenkasi		180	15th century AD	Built by the Pandya kings, the massive gopuram of the temple is the second largest in Tamil Nadu. It is also known as Ulagamman Temple. This temple boasts beautiful sculptures and also has musical stone pillars that produce different sounds when tapped with fingers. The name of the town (Tenkasi) is derived from this temple, meaning "Kasi of the south". The Chittar River nearby is considered sacred, similar to the Ganges.	Tenkasi, Tamil Nadu, India
9	Sarangapani Temple		173	12th century AD	Sarangapani Temple is the largest Vishnu temple in Kumbakonam. The inner shrine is made in the form of a stone chariot, a common feature for temples built under the Chola kings.	Kumbakonam, Tamil Nadu, India
10	Annamalaiyar Temple; Northern Gopuram (Ammani Amman Gopuram)		171	9th century AD	Annamalaiyar Temple covers 10 hectares, and is one of the largest temples in India. It is surrounded by four large unpainted gopurams, one facing each cardinal direction. The northern gopuram is called the Ammani Amman Gopuram.	Tiruvannamalai, Tamil Nadu, India
11	Meenakshi Amman Temple		170	870 AD	Meenakshi Amman Temple houses 14 gopurams, ranging from 45m to 50m in height, the tallest being the southern tower at 51.9 metres (170 ft) high. The temple has some very old sections but the largest part dates back to 17th century. The four gopuram are decorated with many figures from the Hindu pantheon and can be seen from great distances.	Madurai, Tamil Nadu, India
12	Virupaksha Temple, main entrance gopuram	Virupaksha Temple, Hampi	166	15th century AD	Virupaksha Temple was built during the time of Vijayanagara Empire. It is part of the Group of Monuments at Hampi, as a UNESCO World Heritage Site.	Hampi, Karnataka, India
13	Annamalaiyar Temple; Southern Gopuram (Tirumanjana Gopuram)		157	9th century AD	Annamalaiyar Temple covers 10 hectares, and is one of the largest temples in India. It is surrounded by four large unpainted gopurams, one facing each cardinal direction. The southern gopuram is called the Tirumanjana Gopuram.	Tiruvannamalai, Tamil Nadu, India
14	Rajagopalaswamy Temple		154	1523–1575 AD	Rajagopalaswamy Temple was started by Chola kings. Later, king Vijaya Raghava Nayak of the Vijayanagara Empire added the thousand pillar hall, the outer compound, and the large gopuram. Details of these constructions are recorded on inscriptions inside the temple.	Mannargudi, Tamil Nadu, India
15	Lakshmi Narasimha Temple, Mangalagiri		153	1809 AD	Lakshmi Narasimha Temple is dedicated to Vishnu. Its gopuram is eleven storeys tall. Mangalagiri means "The Auspicious Hill". This temple is built on one of the eight important Mahakshetrams (sacred sites) in India	Mangalagiri, Andhra Pradesh, India
16	Ranganathaswamy Temple, Vellayi Gopuram		145	13th Century AD	Ranganathaswamy Temple one of the largest temple complexes in India, covering an area of 156 acres (63 ha). It is home to twelve gopurams, the second largest being the Vellayi Gopuram.	Srirangam, Tamil Nadu, India
17	Sundaravarada Perumal temple		144	(720–796 CE)	Sundaravarada Perumal Temple in Uthiramerur, a village in the South Indian state of Tamil Nadu, is dedicated to the Hindu god Vishnu. Constructed in the Dravidian style of architecture, the temple. The temple is glorified by various acharyas and is one of the 108 Abhimana Kshethram dedicated to Maha Vishnu. Vishnu is worshipped as Sundaravarada Perumal and his consort Lakshmi as Anandavalli.	Uthiramerur, Kanchipuram district, Tamil Nadu, India
18	Annamalaiyar Temple; Northern Gopuram (Pei Gopuram)		144	9th century AD	Annamalaiyar Temple covers 10 hectares, and is one of the largest temples in India. It is surrounded by four large unpainted gopurams, one facing each cardinal direction. The northern gopuram is called the Pei Gopuram.	Tiruvannamalai, Tamil Nadu, India
19	Varadharaja Perumal Temple,Kanchipuram		130	15th century AD	Also known as Perumal koil, dedicated to VishnuThe 7 storied, 130 feet tall temple Gopuram and its extensive exterior was built by Vijayanagara kings and is one of the 108 Divya Desams.	Kanchipuram, Varadharaja Perumal Temple, India.
20	Sankara Narayanasamy Temple, Sankarankovil, Sankaranayinarkoil		127	11th century AD	Sankara Narayanan Temple is located in the town of Sankaranayinarkoil, and is dedicated to both Vishnu and Shiva .	Sankarankovil, Tamil Nadu, India

== Tallest Vimana ==
Vimanas are structures over the sanctum of temples. In Northern India they are called sikharas. In the Nagara style of architecture, the vimana is the sanctum (garbhagriha) of the temple housing the main deities and they are the tallest part of the entire temple. In many cases within South India, the vimanams are confused with gopurams. In Tamil Nadu, vimanams are present above the garbhagriha or sanctum sanctorum of a Hindu temple and will be relatively smaller in size compared to the gopurams, which are usually present at the entrance of the temple.

Rank	Temple	Image	Height ft	Year	Notes	Location
1	Chaturbhuj Temple		344	16th century AD	Built by the Bundela Rajputs of the Orchha State in Central India, the temple blends styles of both ancient Nagara architecture and new Mughal influences. The temple is dedicated to Rama and is the tallest temple structure in India.	Orchha, Madhya Pradesh, India
2	Shri Vishwanath Mandir, BHU		250	1966	The Birla family as per wishes of the BHU's founder Madan Mohan Malaviya, completed the construction, the foundation was laid in March 1931. The temple (Shri Vishwanath Mandir) was finally completed in 1966.	Banaras Hindu University, Varanasi
3	Jagannath Temple, Puri		217	1174 AD	The Jagannath Temple in Puri is a famous Hindu temple dedicated to Jagannath (Vishnu) and located in the coastal town of Puri in the state of Orissa, India. The name Jagannath (Lord of the Universe) is a combination of the Sanskrit words Jagat (Universe) and Nath (Lord of). The temple was built in the 11th century atop its ruins by the progenitor of the Eastern Ganga dynasty, King Anantavarman Chodaganga Deva. The temple is famous for its annual Rath Yatra, or chariot festival, in which the three main temple deities are hauled on huge and elaborately decorated temple cars. Since medieval times, it is also associated with intense religious fervour.	Puri, Odisha, India
4	Rajarajeshwaram Temple, Thanjavur.		216	1010 AD	The Peruvudaiyar Koyil, also known as Rajarajeswaram, at Thanjavur in the Indian state of Tamil Nadu, is the world's first complete granite temple and a brilliant example of the major heights achieved by Cholas kingdom Vishwakarmas in dravidian temple architecture. It is a tribute and a reflection of the power of its patron RajaRaja Chola I. It remains as one of the greatest glories of Indian architecture. The temple is part of the UNESCO World Heritage Site "Great Living Chola Temples".	Thanjavur, Tamil Nadu, India
5	Lingaraj Temple		183.7	11th century AD	Lingaraja Temple is a temple of the Hindu god Harihara and is one of the oldest temples of the Temple City Bhubaneswar, a revered pilgrimage center and the capital of the state of Orissa. The temple of Lingaraja, the biggest of all at Bhubaneswar is located within a spacious compound wall of laterite measuring 520 feet by 465 feet. The wall is 7 feet 6 inches thick and surmounted by a plain slant coping. Alongside the inner face of the boundary wall there runs a terrace probably meant to protect the compound wall against outside aggression.	Bhubaneshwar, Odisha, India
6	Brihadisvara temple, Gangankonda Cholapuram, Tamil Nadu		182	1035 AD	The Vimana with its recessed corners and upward movement presents a striking contrast to the straight-sided pyramidal tower of Thanjavur but with octagon shape of Dravidian architecture. As it rises to a height of 182 feet (55 m) and is shorter than the Thanjavur tower with larger plinth, it is often described as the feminine counterpart of the Thanjavur temple. The Vimana is flanked on either side by small temples; the one in the north now housing the Goddess is fairly well preserved. The small shrine of Chandikesvara is near the steps in the north. In the north-east are a shire housing Durga, a well called lion-well (simhakeni) with a lion figure guarding its steps and a late mandapa housing the office. Nandi is in the east facing the main shrine. In the same direction is the ruined gopura, the entrance tower. The main tower surrounded by little shrines truly presents the appearance of a great Chakravarti (emperor) surrounded by chieftains and vassals. The Gangaikondacholapuram Vimana is undoubtedly a devalaya chakravarti, an emperor among temples of South India.	Gangaikonda Cholapuram, Tamil Nadu, India
7	Somnath Temple		155	1951	Somnath temple, also called Somanātha temple or Deo Patan, is a Hindu temple located in Prabhas Patan, Veraval in Gujarat, India. The present Somnath temple was reconstructed in the Māru-Gurjara style of Hindu temple architecture in 1951.	Veraval, Gujarat, India
8	Konark Sun Temple		130 230 before ruin	13th century AD	Konark Sun Temple (also known as the Black Pagoda), was built in black granite by King Narasimhadeva I (1236 C.E-1264 C.E.) of the Eastern Ganga Dynasty. The temple is a UNESCO World Heritage Site. Built in the 13th century, the temple is designed in the shape of a colossal chariot with 24 wheels (3.3 m dia diameter each) drawn by seven horses and, carrying the Sun god, Surya, across the heavens. It is a stunning monument of religious (Brahmanical) Kalinga architecture. The large structure seen today is actually the mantapa (mandap). Of the main tower, which once stood in the front, only the remains can be seen. This tower (deul) was perhaps 230 feet (70 meters) tall, higher than any other temple in India at that time.	Konark, Odisha, India

== Under construction ==
Planned height metres (feet)	Name	Completion	City	Country	Comment
219 m (721 ft)	Perth Ram Temple	TBA	Perth	Australia	It will be the tallest Ram Temple in the world once completed. At its potential cost of ₹600 crore (US$75 million) it is likely to be one of the most expensive temples in the world.
213 m (700 ft)	Vrindavan Chandrodaya Mandir	est. 2028	Vrindavan	India	It will be the 2nd tallest religious monument in the world once completed. At its potential cost of ₹300 crore (US$42 million) it is likely to be one of the most expensive temples in the world.
123 m (405 ft)	Viraat Ramayan Mandir	est. 2023	Kesaria	India	When completed, it will be the largest religious monument in the world. The Virat Ramayan Mandir will be almost double the height of the world-famous 12th century Angkor Wat temple complex in Cambodia.
49 m (161 ft)	Ram Mandir, Ayodhya	est. 2022	Ayodhya	India	A Hindu temple that is being built at the pilgrimage site of Ram Janmabhoomi.
116 m (380 ft)	Temple of the Vedic Planetarium, Mayapur	2022	Mayapur	India	After completion, the temple will be the 3rd biggest in the world, second to Angkor Wat in Cambodia.
144m (504ft)	Vishv UmiyaDham	2027	Ahmedabad	India	Under construction, the temple of goddess Umiya Mata. https://www.bhaskarenglish.in/local/gujarat/ahmedabad/news/worldtallest-ma-umiya-temple-in-ahmedabad-with-indo-german-design504-feet-height-gold-idol-135198593.html

== See also ==
- List of largest Hindu temples
- List of large temple tanks
- List of human stampedes in Hindu temples
- Lists of Hindu temples
