= List of Hindu temples in Afghanistan =

List of Temples in Afghanistan

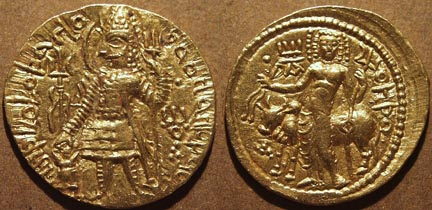
Gold dinar of Kanishka II, emperor of the Kushan Empire, with Lord Shiva (200–220 CE)

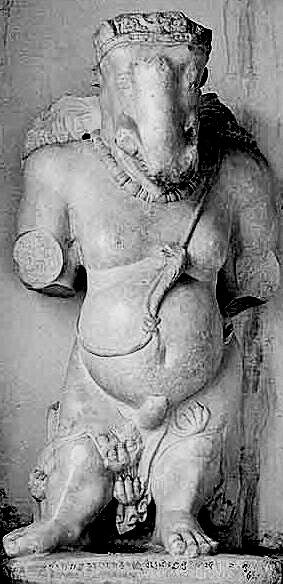
A 5th-century marble Ganesha found in Gardez, Afghanistan, now at Dargah Pir Rattan Nath, Kabul. The inscription says that this "great and beautiful image of Mahāvināyaka" was consecrated by the Hindu Shahi King "Khingala".

Kabul was the capital of the great Hindu Shahi kings. Afghanistan was a great center of Vedic culture. There were many Hindu temples in Afghanistan. Some temples in Kabul have survived the recent turmoil.

== List of Hindu temples in Kabul ==
In Kabul, there are several Hindu temples:

- Asamai Hindu temple, Old city, Dargaa, Asamayi: The Asamai temple is at the foothills of the central hill Asamayi (Koh-i-Asamayi) of the Afghan capital. The hill is named Asamai after Asha, the goddess of hope said to be present on the hilltop since ancient times. The Akhand Jyoti (continuous fire) there has been burning uninterrupted for many centuries. The temple and the Jyoti have survived numerous conflicts in Kabul and are reminders of Afghanistan under the Hindu Shahi kings.
- Baba Jothi Sorup Mandir, Darwaza Lahuri
- Bhairo Mandir, Shor Bazaar
- Guru Hari Rai Gurudwara, Shor Bazaar
- Mangalwar Mandir, Shor Bazaar

== Hindu temples in Kandahar ==
In Kandahar, there were Hindu temples in Shikarpuri Bazaar, Kabuli Bazaar and Jhampeer Sahib (near Sarpooza) and Devi-dwara (near Dand).

== Hindu temples in other cities of Afghanistan ==
There have also been Hindu temples and Gurudwaras at Chasma Sahib, Sultanpur, Jalalabad, Ghazni, Helmand (Lashkerga).

== Hindus of Afghanistan ==
The main Hindu residents of Afghanistan have been Mohyals, Khatris and Aroras, some other communities like Bhatias, and Brahmins other than Mohyals have also been present there.

== See also ==
- Hindu and Buddhist heritage of Afghanistan
- Hinduism in Afghanistan
- Lists of Hindu temples

== Sources ==
- Brown, Robert (1991), Ganesh: Studies of an Asian God, Albany: State University of New York, ISBN 978-0791406571
- Dhavalikar, M. K. (1991). "Gaņeśa: Myth and Reality". In Brown, Robert L. (ed.). Ganesh: Studies of an Asian God. SUNY Series in Tantric Studies. Albany, New York: SUNY Press. pp. 49–68. ISBN 978-0-7914-0656-4. OCLC 42855045.
