= List of largest Hindu temples =

This is a list of the largest Hindu temples in terms of area.

== Current largest temples ==
| Name of the temple | Photo | Area (m^{2}) | Place | Country | Comment |
|---|---|---|---|---|---|
| Angkor Wat | | 1,626,000 | Angkor | Cambodia | Angkor Wat is a temple complex located at Angkor, Cambodia on a site measuring 162.6 hectares (402 acres). The Guinness World Records considers it as the largest religious structure in the world. Originally constructed as a Hindu temple dedicated to the god Maha Vishnu, the supreme deity of Vaishnavism for the Khmer Empire by King Suryavarman II during the 12th century, it was gradually transformed into a Buddhist temple towards the end of the century; as such, it is also described as a "Hindu-Buddhist" temple. |
| BAPS Swaminarayan Akshardham (New Jersey) | | 655,591 | Robbinsville Township, New Jersey | United States | BAPS Swaminarayan Akshardham in Robbinsville, Mercer County, New Jersey, is a 74-hectare (183-acre) Hindu mandir (temple) complex that encompasses the Akshardham mandir, a traditional temple, a welcome center, museum, and event space. Following the opening of the BAPS Shri Swaminarayan Mandir in 2014, the Akshardham mandir was inaugurated on October 8, 2023 as the second-largest Hindu temple in the world, and the largest in the Western Hemisphere, by a significant margin. The temple stands 58 metres (191 ft) high and is situated 70 kilometres (43 mi) south of New York City and 60 kilometres (37 mi) north of Philadelphia. |
| Sri Ranganathaswamy Temple | | 631,000 | Tiruchirapalli | India | The Srirangam Ranganathaswamy Temple is dedicated to Maha Vishnu, the supreme deity of Vaishnavism. The temple, located in Tamil Nadu, occupies an area of 63 hectares (156 acres) with a perimeter of 4,116 metres (13,504 ft), making it the largest temple in India and the largest functioning religious complex in the world with a continuous historical presence. |
| Sri Lakshmi Narayani Devi Temple, Sripuram | | 404,686 | Thirumalaikodi (or simply Malaikodi), Vellore district | India | The Lakshmi Narayani temple's Vimanam and Ardha Mandapam is covered with pure gold, housing the deity Sri Lakshmi Narayani (Hindu goddess of wealth and female consort/wife of Narayana). The temple is located on 40 hectares (100 acres) of land and has been constructed by the Vellore-based charitable trust, Sri Narayani Peedam, headed by its spiritual leader Sri Sakthi Amma also known as 'Narayani Amma'. |
| Prambanan | | 398,000 | Yogyakarta | Indonesia | Candi Prambanan or Candi Rara Jonggrang is a 9th-century Hindu temple compound in Central Java, Indonesia, dedicated to Trimurti. It houses shrines of Maha Vishnu, Brahma, Shiva and their consorts. The temple compound is located approximately 17 kilometres (11 mi) northeast of the city of Yogyakarta on the boundary between Central Java and Yogyakarta provinces. The temple compound, a UNESCO World Heritage Site, is the largest Hindu temple site in Indonesia, and one of the biggest in Southeast Asia. It is characterized by its tall and pointed architecture, typical of Hindu temple architecture, and by the towering 47-metre-high (154 ft) central building (Lord Shiva shrine) inside a large complex of individual temples. Prambanan attracts many visitors from across the world. |
| Chhatarpur Temple | | 280,000 | New Delhi | India | Chhatarpur Temple (Officially: Shri Aadya Katyayani Shakti Peetham) is located in Chhatarpur, Delhi, India. This temple is dedicated to Goddess, Katyayani. The entire complex of the temple is spread over a wide area of 28 hectares (70 acres). |
| BAPS Swaminarayan Akshardham (Delhi) | | 404,686 | Delhi | India | BAPS Akshardham is a Hindu temple complex in Delhi, India. Also referred to as Delhi Akshardham or BAPS Swaminarayan Akshardham, the complex displays millennia of traditional Indian and Hindu culture, spirituality, and architecture. Akshardham Temple was inaugurated on November 6, 2005, by Pramukh Swami Maharaj. The building was inspired and moderated by Pramukh Swami Maharaj, the spiritual head of the Bochasanwasi Shri Akshar Purushottam Swaminarayan Sanstha, whose 3,000 volunteers helped 7,000 artisans construct Akshardham. |
| Prem Mandir, Vrindavan | | 222,577 | Vrindavan | India | Prem Mandir (lit. The Temple of Divine Love) is a Hindu temple dedicated to Radha Krishna and Sita Ram Incarnations of Maha Vishnu, the supreme deity of Vaishnavism. The temple is located in Vrindavan, Mathura district, Uttar Pradesh, India. The temple was established by Jagadguru Shri Kripalu Ji Maharaj (the fifth Original Jagadguru). It is maintained by Jagadguru Kripalu Parishat. The complex is on a 22 hectares (55 acres) site on the outskirts of Vrindavan. It is dedicated to Radha Krishna and Sita Ram. Radha Krishna are on the first level and Sita Ram are on the second level. |
| Kalika Bhagawati Temple | | 208,185 | Baglung | Nepal | Kalika Bhagawati Temple, also known as Baglung Kalika Bhagawati Temple, is a significant Hindu temple located south-east of the town of Baglung in western Nepal. It is situated on the southern banks of the Kali Gandaki River. The presiding deity of the temple is Kalika (or Kali), one of the fiercest forms of Shakti, the consort of Shiva. Kalika is one of the main goddess for the Shaiva sect. The temple courtyard has four entrances in each of the cardinal directions. The temple compound contains a sprawling collection of various other small temples dedicated to Shiva, Radha Krishna, Lakshmi Narayan and others. The major festival of the temple, Chaite-Dashain, is held on the eighth day of the Shukla Paksha (bright lunar fortnight) of the month of Chaitra, with thousands of devotees visiting. |
| Besakih Temple | | 200,000 | Bali | Indonesia | The Besakih Temple is a pura complex in the village of Besakih on the slopes of Mount Agung in eastern Bali, Indonesia. It is the most important, the largest and holiest temple of Hindu religion in Bali, and one of a series of Balinese temples. Perched nearly 1,000 metres (3,300 ft) up the side of Gunung Agung, it is an extensive complex of 23 separate but related temples with the largest and most important being Pura Penataran Agung. The temple is built on six levels, terraced up the slope. The entrance is marked by a candi bentar (split gateway), and beyond it the Kori Agung is the gateway to the second courtyard. |
| Ramanuja Temple with 108 Divya Desams | | 182, 109 | Muchintal | India | The Statue of Equality is a statue of the 11th-century Indian philosopher Ramanuja, located on the premises of the Chinna Jeeyar Ashrama cum temple at Muchintal, Ranga Reddy district in the outskirts of Hyderabad. It is the second tallest sitting statue in the world. The temple consists of 108 Divya Desams in the premises of the Chinna Jeeyar Ashrama cum temple which is about 18 hectares (45 acres) of land. |
| Belur Math | | 160,000 | Howrah | India | Belūr Maṭh or Belur Mutt is the headquarters of the Ramakrishna Math and Mission, founded by Swami Vivekananda, a chief disciple of Ramakrishna Paramahamsa. It is located on the west bank of Hooghly River, Belur, West Bengal, India and is one of the significant institutions in Calcutta. This temple is the heart of the Ramakrishna Movement. The temple is notable for its architecture that fuses Hindu, Christian and Islamic motifs as a symbol of unity of all religions. |
| Nataraja Temple | | 160,000 | Chidambaram | India | Thillai Nataraja Temple, also referred as the Chidambaram Nataraja Temple, is a Hindu temple dedicated to Nataraja, the form of Shiva as the lord of dance. This temple is located in Chidambaram, Tamil Nadu, India. Chidambaram is a temple complex spread over 16 hectares (40 acres) in the heart of the city. The main complex to Shiva Nataraja. The Temple also contains shrines to deities such as Sivakami Amman, Vishnu, Ganesh and Murugan. |
| PeruvudaiyarTemple | | 102,400 | Thanjavur | India | The Brihadeeswarar Temple, also called the Big Temple, was built by Rajaraja I in 1010 CE and is dedicated to Shiva. The Big Temple is not only a magnificent edifice with its majestic vimana, sculptures, architecture and frescoes but also has a wealth and richness of Tamil inscriptions engraved on stone in superb calligraphy. The temple is part of the UNESCO World Heritage Site. One wonders how such a big temple could be built in the flat for 6 years taking into account the amount of stone and soil to be moved and the lack of powered machinery available in those days. The massive sized main Vimanam (Tower) is 66 metres (216 ft) high. The Vimanam has 16 elaborately articulated stores and dominates the main quadrangle. It has a monolithic Nandhi weighing about 25 tonnes and is about 3.7 metres (12 ft) high and 6.1 metres (20 ft) long. The presiding deity of the lingam is 3.7 metres (12 ft) tall. |
| Annamalaiyar Temple | | 101,171 | Tiruvannamalai | India | The Annamalaiyar Temple is a noted Hindu temple dedicated to Lord Shiva, and it is the second largest temple (by the area used completely for religious purpose). It has got four stately towers on all the four sides and four high stone walls just like the rampart walls of a fort. The 11-tiered highest (217 feet (66 m)) Eastern Tower is called the Rajagopuram. The fortified walls pierced with four gopura entrances offer a formidable look to this vast complex. |
| Dakshineswar Kali Temple | | 101,171 | Kolkata | India | The Dakshineswar Kali Temple is situated on the eastern bank of the Hooghly River (a distributary of the Ganga River) in suburban Kolkata. The presiding deity of the temple is Bhavatarini, an aspect of Goddess Kali, meaning, 'She who liberates Her devotees from the ocean of existence i.e. Saṃsāra'. The temple was built in 1855 by Rani Rashmoni, a philanthropist and a devotee of Kali. The temple complex is spread over 10 hectares (25 acres) and is one of the largest temples in Bengal. |
| Varadharaja Perumal Temple | | 95,000 and sacred tanks some of which located outside the complex. The temple tank is called Anantha Theertham. | Kanchipuram | India | The Varadharaja Perumal Temple is dedicated to Lord Vishnu located in the holy city of Kanchipuram, Tamil Nadu, India. It is one of the Divya Desams, the 108 temples of Vishnu believed to have been visited by the 12 poet saints, or Alwars. It is located in a suburb of Kanchipuram known as the Vishnu Kanchi that is a home for many famous Lord Shri Vishnu temples. One of the greatest Hindu scholars of Vaishnava VisishtAdvaita philosophy, Ramanuja is believed to have resided in this temple. |
| Rajagopalaswamy temple | | 93,000 | Mannargudi | India | The Rajagopalaswamy Temple is a Vaishnavite shrine located in the town of Mannargudi, Tamil Nadu, India. The Front Temple tower is 48 metres (156 ft) tall. The presiding deity is Rajagopalaswamy, a form of Lord Krishna. The temple is spread over an area of 9.3 hectares (23 acres) and The temple tank is called Haridra Nadhi, 353 metres (1,158 ft) long and 255 metres (837 ft) broad 9.3 hectares (23 acres) is one of the important Vaishnavite shrines in India. The temple is called Dakshina Dwarka (Southern Dwarka) along with Guruvayoor by Hindus. The temple is also 9.3 hectares (23 acres) and the Temple tank Haridra Nadhi is also 9.3 hectares (23 acres) making it one of the largest temple tanks in India^{[2][4]} |
| Ekambareswarar Temple and Nilathingal Thundam Perumal temple | | 93,000 | Kanchipuram | India | The Ekambareswarar Temple is a Hindu temple dedicated to Lord Shiva and Lord Vishnu, located in Kanchipuram in the state of India. It is one of the five major Shiva temples or Pancha Bootha Sthalams (each representing a natural element) representing the element Earth. The temple is glorified in the Nalayira Divya Prabandham, the early medieval Tamil canon of the Alvar saints from the 6th–9th centuries CE. It is one of the 108 Divya Desams dedicated to Maha Vishnu, who is worshiped as Nilathingal Thunda Perumal and his consort Lakshmi as Nilathingal Thunda Nayagi. |
| Thyagaraja Temple | | 81,000 | Tiruvarur | India | The ancient Sri Thyagaraja Temple at Tiruvarur is dedicated to the Somaskanda aspect of Shiva. The temple complex has shrines dedicated to Vanmikanathar, Tyagarajar and the Kamalaamba, and covers an area of over 20 acres (8.1 ha) The Kamalalayam temple tank covers around 16 acres (6.5 ha), one of the largest in the country. The temple chariot is the largest of its kind in Tamil Nadu. |
| Thirukurungudivalli sametha Vaishnava nambi Perumal Temple, Thirukurungudi | | 74866.84 | Thirukkurungudi | India | Vaishnava Nambi and Thirukurungudivalli Nachiar Temple in Thirukkurungudi, a village in Tirunelveli district in the South Indian state of Tamil Nadu, is dedicated to the Hindu god Vishnu. It is located 45 km from Tirunelveli. Constructed in the Dravidian style of architecture, the temple is glorified in the Naalayira Divya Prabandham, the early medieval Tamil canon of the Alvar saints from the 6th–9th centuries CE. It is one of the 108 Divya Desams dedicated to Vishnu, who is worshipped as Vaishnava Nambi and his consort Lakshmi as Thirukurungudivalli. The temple is locally referred as Bhuloka Vaikuntam. The temple occupies around 18.5 acres (7.5 ha). There are a number of halls, that have sculpted pillars from the Nayak period. There is a festival hall in the second precinct in the temple facing South that has sculpted pillars indicating various Hindu legends. |
| BAPS Shri Swaminarayan Mandir Toronto | | 72,843 | Toronto | Canada | The BAPS Shri Swaminarayan Mandir in Etobicoke, Toronto, Ontario, Canada is a traditional Hindu place of worship that was built by the BAPS Swaminarayan Sanstha. The BAPS Swaminarayan Sanstha, which is headed by Mahant Swami Maharaj, is a global spiritual organization within the Swaminarayan branch of Hinduism. The mandir was built in 18 months and consists of 24,000 pieces of hand-carved Italian carrara marble, Turkish limestone and Indian pink stone. The mandir is the largest of its kind in Canada and was constructed according to guidelines outlined in ancient Hindu scriptures. The grounds spread over 7.3 hectares (18 acres) and in addition to the mandir, include a haveli and the Heritage Museum. |
| Jambukeswarar Temple | | 72,843 | Tiruchirappalli | India | Thiruvanaikaval (also Thiruvanaikal) is a Shiva temple in Tiruchirapalli, in the state of India. The temple was built by Kocengannan (Kochenga Chola), one of the Early Cholas, around 1,800 years ago. |
| Nellaiappar Temple | Tirunelveli | 71,000 | Tirunelveli | India | The Nellaiappar Temple, dedicated to Shiva, was built 2500–3000 years ago. The river Tamirabharani referred to by poets as "Porunai" flows round the city. One of the famous temples in India steeped in tradition and history and also known for its musical pillars and other brilliant sculptural splendor. The temples were built by Muluthukanda Rama Pandiyan. The musical pillars in the Mani Mandapam which produce sound in various pitches when struck, the Somavara Mandapam, the 1000 pillared hall, and the Tamra sabha with intricate wood work, and the Vasantha Mandapam are some of the noteworthy points in this temple. The temple car belongs to this temple is the third largest temple car in India and it is more than 510 years ago and it is the oldest car festival in the world. |
| Meenakshi Temple | | 71,000 | Madurai | India | The Meenakshi Sundareswarar Temple, or Meenakshi Amman Temple, is dedicated to Lord Shiva — who is known here as Sundareswarar or Beautiful Lord — and his consort, Parvati who is known as Meenakshi. The temple forms the heart and lifeline of the 2500-year-old city of Madurai. The complex houses 14 magnificent Gopurams or towers including two golden Gopurams for the main deities, that are elaborately sculptured and painted. |
| Batu Caves | | 65,000 | Gombak | Malaysia | Rising almost 100 m above the ground, the Batu Caves temple complex consists of three main caves and a few smaller ones. The biggest, referred to as Cathedral Cave or Temple Cave, has a very high ceiling and features ornate Hindu shrines. To reach it, visitors must climb a steep flight of 272 steps. At the base of the hill are two more cave temples, Art Gallery Cave and Museum Cave, both of which are full of Hindu statues and paintings. This complex was renovated and opened as the Cave Villa in 2008. Many of the shrines relate the story of Lord Murugan's victory over the demon Soorapadman. An audio tour is available to visitors. A 42.7-metre (140 ft) high statue of Lord Murugan was unveiled in January 2006, having taken 3 years to construct. |
| Sri Lakshmi Narasimha Swamy Temple, Yadadri | | 62,000 | Yadadri Bhuvanagiri district, Telangana | India | Sri Lakshmi Narasimha Swamy Temple or simply known as Yadadri or Yadagirigutta temple, (also known as Pancha Narasimha Kshetram and Rishi Aradhana Kshetram) is a Hindu temple situated on a hillock in the small town of Yadagirigutta in the Yadadri Bhuvanagiri district of the Indian state of Telangana. The temple is an abode of Narasimha, an incarnation of Lord Vishnu. |
| Shri Shiva Vishnu Temple, Victoria | | 61,000 | Victoria | Australia | The Shri Shiva Vishnu Hindu Temple is located in this suburb. This temple is the largest Hindu temple in Victoria. Worship at the temple is centred around Lord Shiva and Lord Vishnu, the presiding deities of two dominant streams in the Hindu ritualistic tradition. The temple attempts to bring the two streams together and provide a synthesis. Many Hindus residing in Melbourne worship there and is most popularly known for holding the annual Hindu festivals of Holi and Diwali. |
| Vaitheeswaran Koil | | 61,000 | Vaitheeswaran Koil, Mayiladuthurai | India | The Vaitheeswaran Temple is located in India, dedicated to the god Shiva. In this temple, Lord Shiva is worshiped as "Vaitheeswaran" or the "God of medicine"; worshipers believe that prayers to Lord Vaitheeswaran can cure diseases. |
| Krishna Janmasthan Temple Complex | | 54,106 | Mathura | India | The Krishna Janmasthan Temple Complex is a group of Hindu temples in Mallapura, Mathura, Uttar Pradesh, India. These temples are built at the location where the Hindu God Shri Krishna is believed to be born, and is adjacent to the Shahi Eidgah mosque built by Aurangzeb. The temple is considered to be present and have religious significance at least from 600 BCE. The temples were destroyed multiple times throughout history, most recently by the muslim Mughal emperor Aurangzeb in 1670. |
| Jagannath Temple | | 37,000 | Puri | India | The Jagannath Temple in Puri is a famous Hindu temple dedicated to Jagannath (Vishnu) in the coastal town of Puri in the state of Odisha, India. The name Jagannath (Lord of the Universe) is a combination of the Sanskrit words Jagat (Universe) and Nath (Lord of). |
| Birla Mandir | | 30,000 | Delhi | India | The Laxminarayan Temple (also known as the Birla Mandir) is a Hindu temple dedicated to Laxminarayan in Delhi, India. The temple is built in honour of Lakshmi (Hindu goddess of wealth) and her consort Narayana (Vishnu, Preserver in the Trimurti). The temple was built in 1622 by Vir Singh Deo and renovated by Prithvi Singh in 1793. During 1933–39, Laxmi Narayan Temple was built by Baldeo Das Birla of Birla family. Thus, the temple is also known as Birla Mandir. Since then, funds for further renovations and support have come from the Birla family. |
| Sri Anantha Padmanabhaswamy Temple, Thiruvananthapuram | | 29,000 | Thiruvananthapuram | India | The Shree Padmanabhaswamy Temple is a Hindu temple located in Thiruvananthapuram, the capital of the state of Kerala, India. It is widely considered as the world's richest Hindu temple. The name of the city of 'Thiruvananthapuram' in Malayalam and Tamil translates to "The City of Ananta" (Ananta being a form of Vishnu). The temple is built in an intricate fusion of the Kerala style and the Dravidian style of architecture. |
| ISKCON Temple, Bangalore | | 28,000 | Bangalore | India | Sri Radha Krishna-Chandra Temple (Kannada: ಶ್ರೀ ರಾಧಾ ಕೃಷ್ಣ ಮಂದಿರ) is one of the largest Krishna-Hindu temples in the world. It is situated in Bangalore in the Indian state of Karnataka. The temple is dedicated to Hindu deities Radha Krishna and propagates monotheism as mentioned in Chandogya Upanishad. |
| Shri Swaminarayan Mandir | | 27,000 | Karachi | Pakistan | The Shri Swaminarayan Mandir, in Karachi, is a Hindu temple that is the only Swaminarayan temple in Pakistan. The temple is notable for its size and frontage, over 32,306 square yards (27,012 m^{2}) on the M. A. Jinnah Road in Karachi city. The temple celebrated its anniversary of 150 years in April 2004. It is believed that not only Hindus but also adherents of Islam visit the temple, which adds to its notability. There is a sacred cowshed within the premises of this temple. The temple is located at the centre of a Hindu neighborhood in Karachi. |
| Pundarikakshan Perumal Temple | | 26,300 | Thiruvallarai | India | The Pundarikakshan Perumal Temple or Thiruvellarai Temple in Thiruvellarai,^{a} a village in the outskirts of Tiruchirappalli in the South Indian state of Tamil Nadu, is dedicated to the Hindu god Vishnu. Constructed in the Dravidian style of architecture, the temple is glorified in the Naalayira Divya Prabandham, the early medieval Tamil canon of the Alvar saints from the 6th–9th centuries CE. It is one of the 108 Divya Desams dedicated to Vishnu, who is worshipped as Pundarikakshan and his consort Lakshmi as Pankajavalli. According to legends, the temple is said to have been built by Sibi Chakravarthy, king of Ayodhya in Treta Yuga 15 lakh years ago. This temple is older than Srirangam temple. The temple has three inscriptions in its two rock-cut caves, two dating from the period of Nandivarman II (732–796 CE) and the other to that of Dantivarman (796–847). It also has Pallava sculptural depictions of Narasimha and Varaha, two of the ten avatars of Vishnu. |

== Under construction ==
| Planned area (m^{2}) | Capacity | Name | Completion | City | Country | Comment |
|---|---|---|---|---|---|---|
| 150,000 | TBA | Perth Ram Temple | TBA | Perth | Australia | The Perth Ram Temple will be one of the tallest religious monument in the world once completed. At its potential cost of ₹600 crore (US$75 million), it is likely to be one of the most expensive temples in the world. |
| 250,905 | 30,000 | Vrindavan Chandrodaya Mandir | est. 2024 | Vrindavan | India | The Vrindavan Chandrodaya Mandir will be the tallest religious monument in the world once completed. At its potential cost of ₹300 crore (US$42 million), it is likely to be one of the most expensive temples in the world. |
| 909,371 | 20,000 | Viraat Ramayan Mandir | est. 2025 | Kesaria | India | The Virat Ramayan Mandir will be almost double the height of the world-famous 12th century Angkor Wat temple complex in Cambodia. |
| 490,000 | 100,000 | Ram Mandir | est. 2024 | Ayodhya | India | The Ayodhya Ram Temple is a Hindu temple that is being built at the pilgrimage site of Ram Janmabhoomi. |
| 303,514 | 20,000 | Mayapur Chandrodaya Mandir | | Mayapur | India | The Temple of the Vedic Planetarium, Mayapur will be a large Hindu temple which will function as a Hindu planetarium. |
| 110,000 | – | BAPS Hindu Mandir Abu Dhabi | 2024 | Abu Dhabi | United Arab Emirates | The BAPS Hindu Mandir Abu Dhabi, upon completion, will be the first traditional Hindu stone mandir in the Middle East. |
| 526,091 | – | Carolina Murugan Temple | Yet to be confirmed | North Carolina | United States | |
| 6,968 | 1,500 | Gurudarbar Sindhi Temple | est. 2022 | Dubai | United Arab Emirates | |
| 242,811 | 25,000 | Vishv Umiyadham | est. 2027 | Ahmedabad | India | The foundation stone of Vishv Umiyadham was laid by Prime Minister Narendra Modi in March 2019. |

== See also ==
- Lists of Hindu temples
- List of tallest gopurams
- List of largest temple tanks
- List of human stampedes in Hindu temples
