= List of Hindu temples in Bareilly =

Bareilly, a city in Uttar Pradesh, India, is home to many ancient Hindu temples. Housing the ancient fortress city of Ahicchattra, from where Bareilly served as a seat of the influential Empire, the region also has a unique Shiva influence. Four Nath (Shiva) temples are situated on the city's four corners: the Alakha Nath, Trivati Nath, Madhi Nath and Dhopeshwar Nath temples. So Bareilly is known as Nath Nagri (city of Shiva).

== Notable list ==
Below is a list of various Hindu Temples in Bareilly:

- Sita Ram Mandir, Gangapur
- Alakh Nath Temple
- Anand Ashram
- Bankhandinath
- Bhagwaan Mahaveer Temple
- Bhairav Nath Mandir
- Bhole Nath Temple, Kurmanchal Nagar
- Chaurasi Ghanta Temple, Subhash Nagar
- Dhopeshwarnath Mandir, Cantt.
- Gauri Shankar Temple
- Hanuman Temple (near Hartmann College)
- Hanuman Temple (Civil Lines)
- Hari Mandir
- Hathi Wala Mandir, Sahukara
- Iskcon Bareilly
- Jagannath Temple
- Jagmohaneshwar Temple (Pashupatinath Mandir)
- Kanker kuan Nath
- Lakshmi Narayan Temple/Chunna Miyan ka Mandir
- Ma Kali Mandir, Kalibari
- Madhi Nath Temple
- Mandir Seth Girdhari Lal
- Math Tulsi Sthal
- Nav Devi Temple
- Radha Madhav Sankirtan Mandal
- Shiv Temple B.I. Bazar (Ancient)
- Shrinathpuram Sanatan Dharma Temple
- Shri Shirdi Sai Raksha Dham, Izatnagar
- Shri Dauji Ka Mandir
- Shri Chote Dauji ka Mandire
- Shri Bankey Bihari Temple
- Shri Turant Nath Maharaj Temple
- Tapeshwar Nath Temple
- Trivati Nath Mandir
- Bhairav Nath Mandir
- Prabhu Sadanand Charan Bhumi

== Nath Temples ==
=== Alakh Nath ===
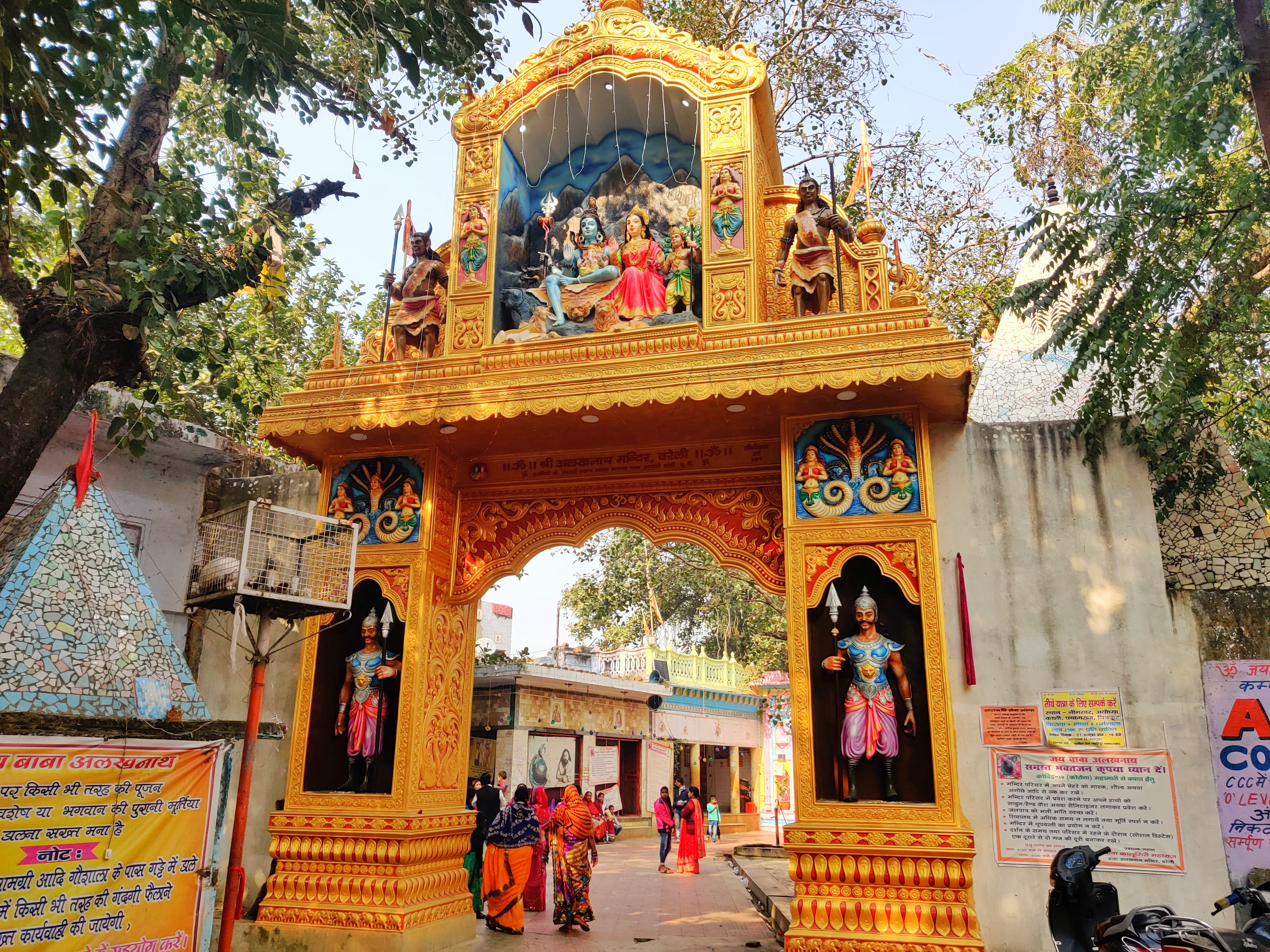
Entry gate of Alakhnath Temple, Bareilly

The Alakh Nath Temple is the headquarters of the Anand Akhara order of Naga sannyasins. Members of this order of Shiva devotees are also known as Naga Babas. The temple is situated on Nainital Road near Qila Bareilly. Baba Kalu Giri is the present Mahant of the Temple.

The Alakhnath Temple has a history of over 930 years. According to a local legend, The Qila region was home to dense forests in ancient times. Saint Alakhiya used to penance below a Banyan Tree. It was after him that the temple was named Alakhnath Temple. During late 17th century under Mughal rule, several temples were demolished in the region, and many saints took refuge in the temple complex. It is believed that the Mughals could not enter the complex.

The temple complex beyond the inner gate consists of several buildings with a kind of courtyard in the center. Large and small shrines are there, some within buildings and some outside. Devotees go from one shrine to the next to make offerings and prayers. Animals of various kinds are around the place. Cows and goats are tethered and behind one of the buildings is a camel. A 51 Feet Statue of Lord Hanuman is installed just outside the Temple Premises.

=== Bankhandi Nath ===
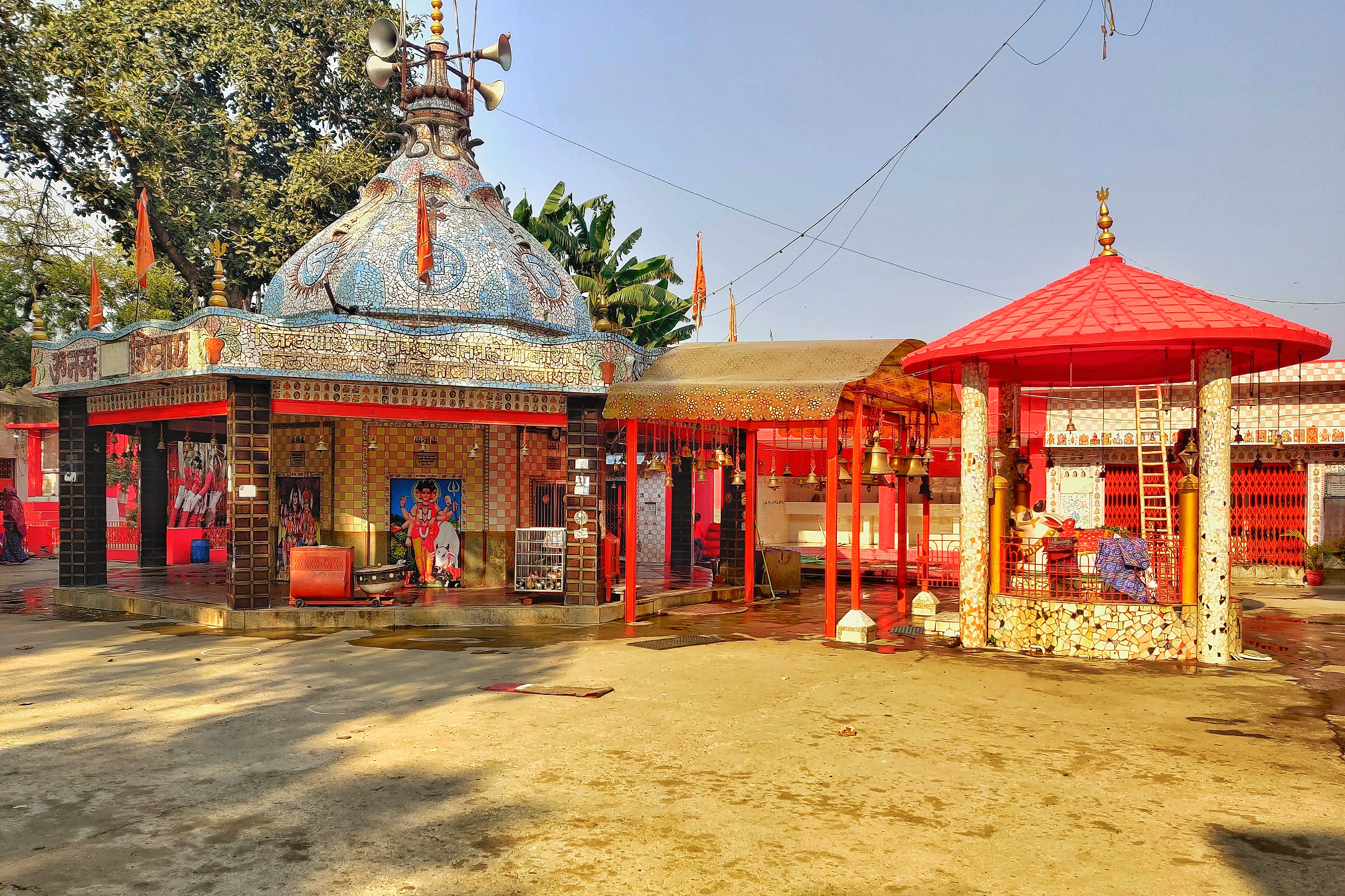
Bankhandinath temple, Bareilly

The Bankhandinath Temple, dedicated to Lord Shiva is situated in the Jogi Navada neighbourhood of Bareilly. The temple is administered by the members of Dashnam Juna Akhada.

This temple is said to have been built in the Dvapara Yuga era. It is believed that a large number of sages and saints used to gather in the temple and do rigorous penance. Many of them also took samadhi in the temple. The samadhis are present in the temple complex even today.

=== Dhopeshwar Nath ===
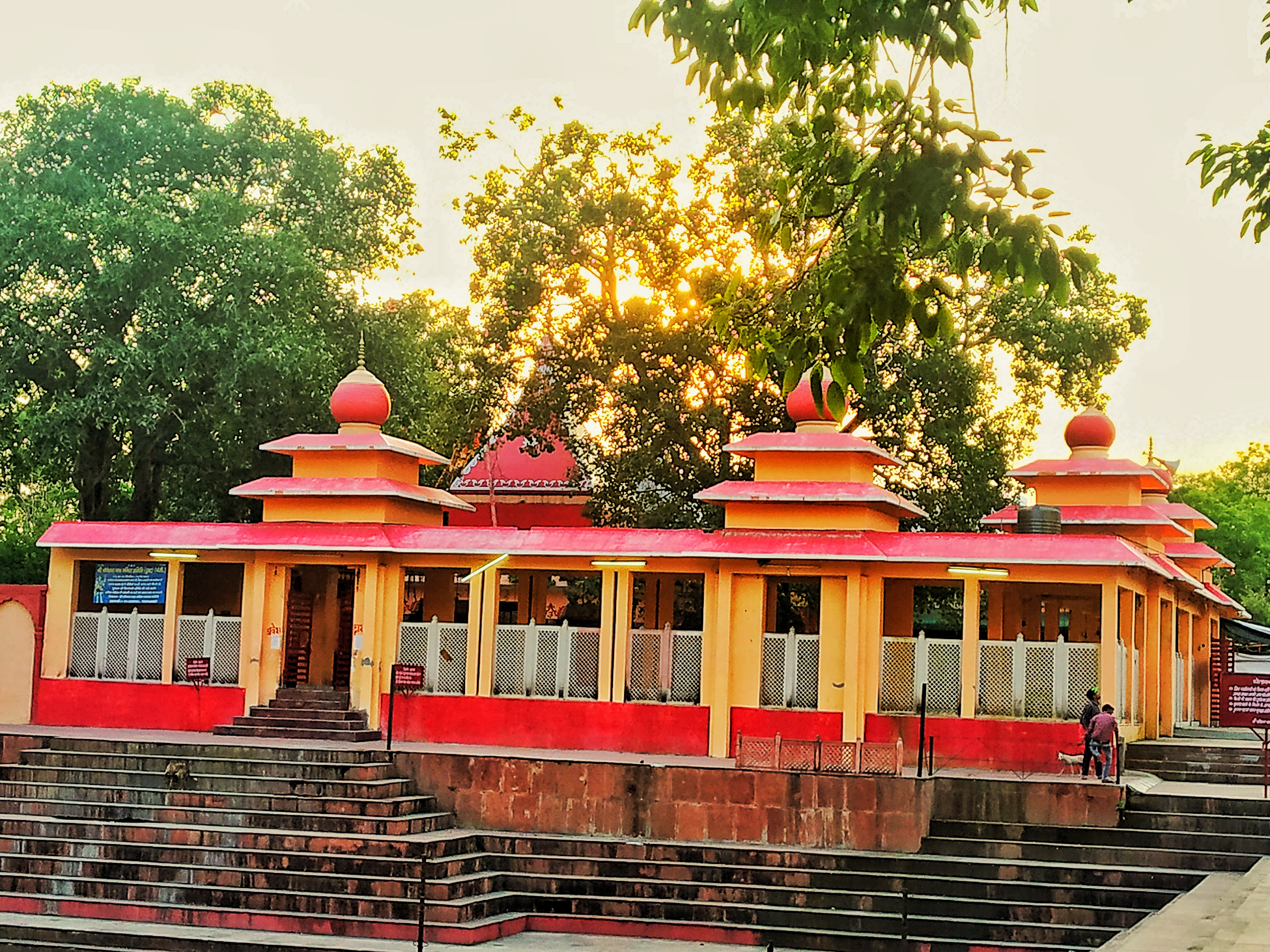
Dhopeshwarnath temple, Bareilly

The temple is dedicated to Lord Dhopeshwarnath. The site is the birth site of Draupadi and Dhrishtadyumna in the Mahābhārata era. Both Draupadi and Dhrishtadyumna were considered to be born by the grace of Lord Shiva.

It is located in the Sadar Bazar Bareilly Cantonment area.

=== Madhi Nath ===
This temple shares its name with its locality. It is a temple of Shiva. It is believed that this temple is more than 5000 years old and shivling of this temple was established by pandavas during their exile.

=== Pashupati Nath ===
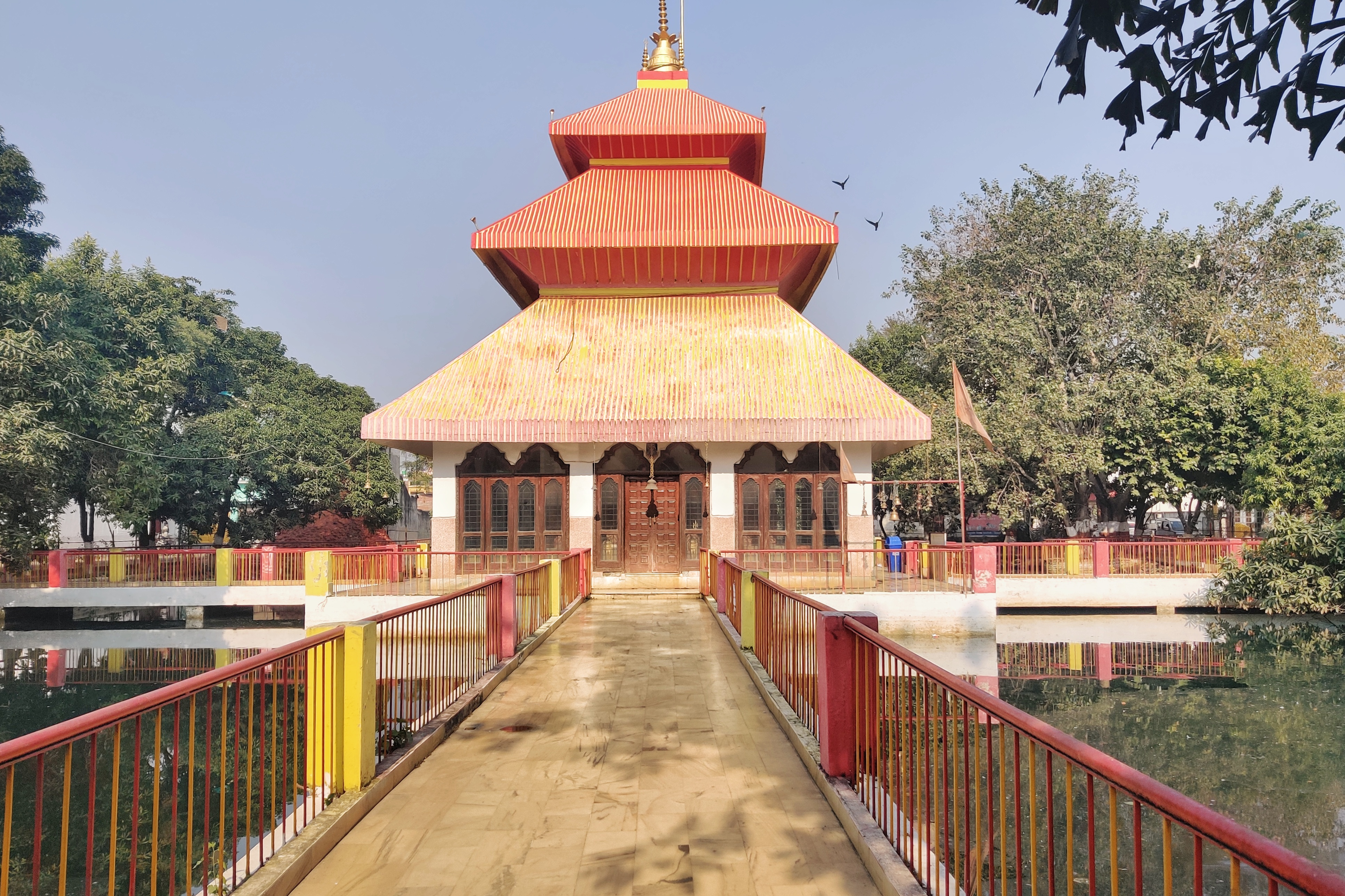
Pashupatinath temple, Bareilly

The Pashupatinath Temple, also known as the Jagmohaneshwarnath Temple, is the newest amongst the seven Nath Temples. The temple is dedicated to Lord Pashupatinath (English: Lord of the Animals), an incarnation of Lord Shiva.

Situated on the Pilibhit bypass Road, the Pashupatinath temple was built in 2003 by a builder of the city. Construction of the temple took about a year. The Shivaling installed inside the main temple is panchamukhi (Five-Faced), similar to the Pashupatinath temple of Nepal.

The temple complex consists of the main temple, a Bhairav temple, a replica of the Mount Kailash and 108 Shivalingas dedicated to the 108 names of Lord Shiva. Rudraksh and sandalwood trees have also been planted in the temple premises. The main temple is located in the middle of a pond, that surrounds it on all sides. Fishes and Ducks are found in abundance in the Pond. The temple complex also houses a stone brought from Ramsetu of Rameswaram, Which floats in water.

=== Tapeshwar Nath ===
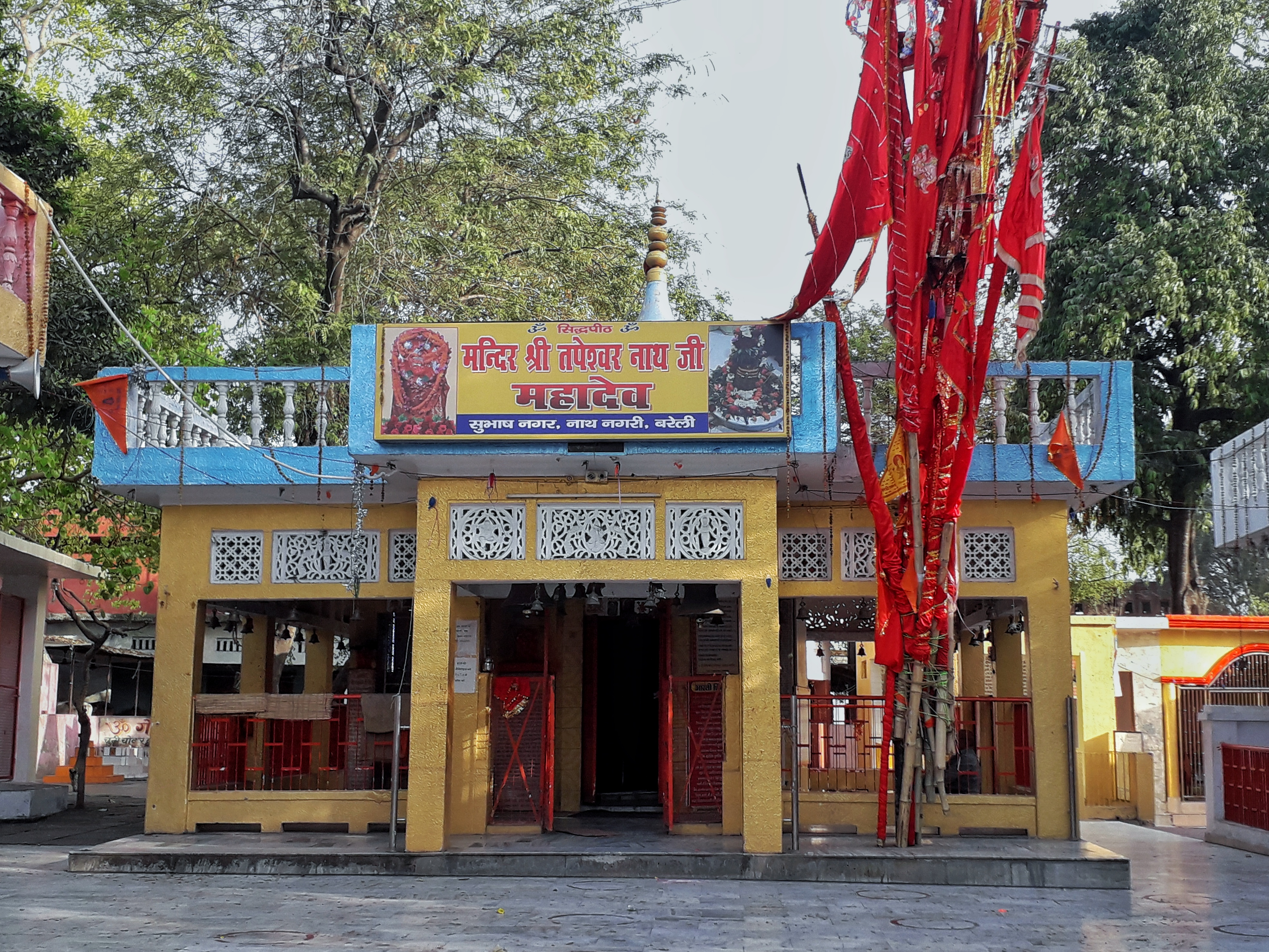
Tapeshwarnath Temple, Bareilly

This is the oldest temple of the city, near Bsa office subhash nagar Veer bhatti ground near railway station. Both modern and old activities are performed there.

=== Trivati Nath ===
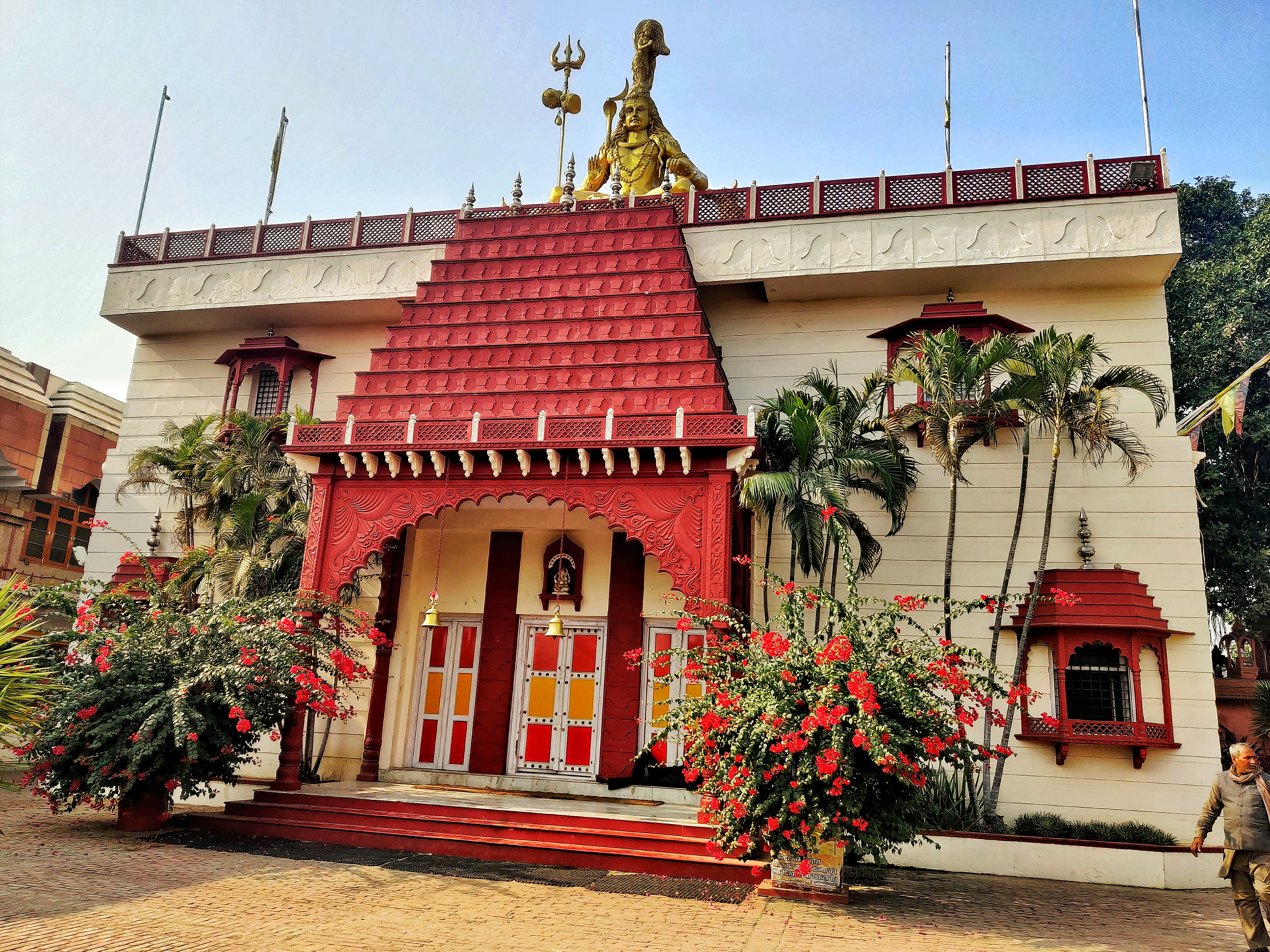
Trivatinath Temple, Bareilly

This temple is situated in the central part of the town on the Macnair Road. According to myth Lord Shiva - Trivati Nath foretold his first appearance under the three Banyan trees in dense panchal area in the dream of a Mohan Chandra Gadariya (shepherd). On awakening Mohan Chandra Gadariya (shepherd) found a beautiful Shiv Lingam near the roots of three Banyan trees. This way according to Hindu calendar Vikram Samvat 1474 is the Emerging(Prakatya) year of Baba Trivati Nath ji Bhagwan in the form of a natural Shiv. This place gradually became the center of worship.

== Radha Madhav Sankirtan Mandal ==
Bareilly is the headquarters of Radha Madhav Sankirtan Mandal, which has branches all across India. It was founded by the late Shree J.R. Malik & Shree Ashanand Malik and is presently run by Y. K. Malik and S. Malik. Its aim is to spread Banke Bihari awareness through Kirtans, Katha, etc. This mandal has Radha Madhav Public School along with Ashrams and a Hospital at Vrindavan & Barsana.

== Shri Panchmukhi Hanuman Mandir ==
Another temple of Lord Shri Panchmukhi Hanuman is located at Sugar Factory Road, Subhash Nagar, Bareilly 243001.

== Other ancient temples ==
=== Kanker kuan nath ===
Another historical temple of Lord Ram and Shiv. This temple was tested in 1885. It is located at Shahbaad near Alam giri ganj.

=== Jagannath Temple ===
Another historical temple of Lord Shiva is in Lala Champak Rai Ki Bagia near Alakhnath temple in front of the Ganga Temple. It is also referred to as the Jagannath Temple.

It is roughly 200 years old. Due to limited access, with no paved roads, is frequented by fewer devotees than its more accessible counterparts.

=== Tulsi Math ===
Near the Alakhnath Temple is the Tulsi Math. Tulsidas, the acclaimed writer of the Ramacharitamanas, said to have been the re-incarnation of Valmiki, the author of the Ramayana, made this site his home sometime around 1600 CE.

=== Lakshmi Narayan Temple ===
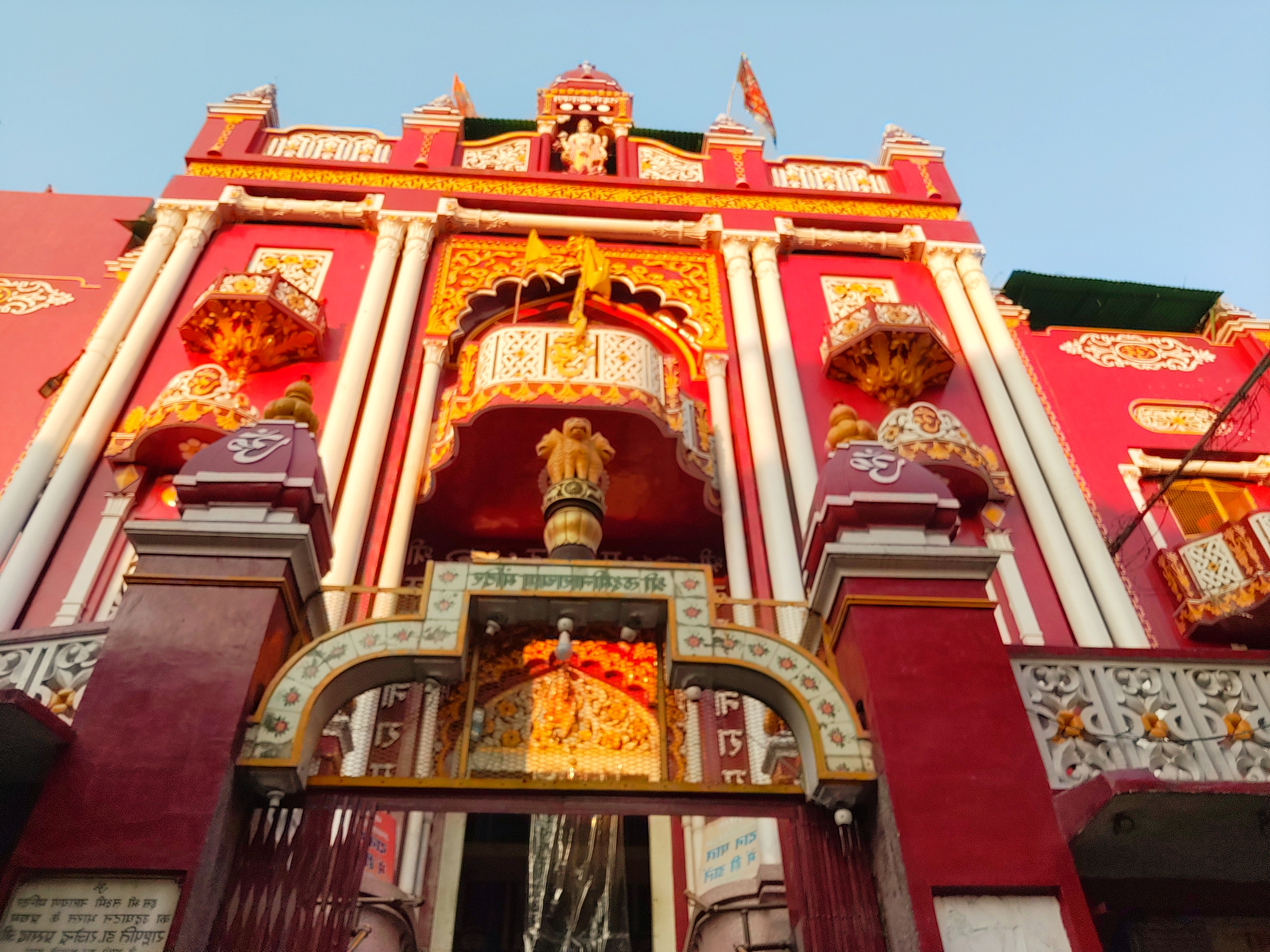
Lakshmi Narayan Temple

The Lakshmi Narayan Temple is dedicated to Lakshminarayan, an incarnation of Vishnu, and is located in Katra Manrai street near Bara Bazar in the Koharapeer region of the City Centre. The temple is also known as Chunna Miyan Temple after its founder.

When India became independent in 1947, a number of migrants came to the city from Pakistan. These Hindu migrants settled near the city centre and some of them built a small place of worship among existing ruins; the place was later discovered to be belonging to Seth Fazal-ul-Rahman, whose nickname was 'Chunna Miyan'. Rahman filed a claim against the illegal occupation of the land. As the proceedings of the case continued, Harmilap ji Maharaj, a Hindu saint came to the city from Haridwar to deliver a holy Sermon. Chunna Miyan attended the satsang and had a change of heart. He not only decided to withdraw the case but also donated his land and Rs 1,00,001 to build this temple. Chunna Milan also went to Jaipur to get the idols of Laxminarayan and his consort and installed them at the temple.

The temple is situated in the midst of a densely populated area and can be reached only through narrow streets. It was inaugurated on 13 May 1960 by Dr Rajendra Prasad the first President of India.

=== ISKCON Bareilly ===
Very soon ISKCON created one of the very big and famous temples, known as Shri Shri Radha Vrindavn Chandra Mandir – the aaddhtyatmik kendra, Bareilly. A large plot of land was given by Girdhar Ji Khandelwal Welfare Foundation, to ISKCON Society and its construction has begun. It will be on Pilibhit Road. Bareilly is one of few cities of U.P. and Northern India to have such as temple. The temple also consists of Gauseva Movement known as Sri Sri Radha Vrindavanchandra Gaushala.

Any information regarding the temple and its activities can be gathered directly from ISKCON Bareilly, there is no any other branch or head office elsewhere other than ISKCON Bareilly itself. You may contact mobile no. 07088701776 for more details.

Popularly known as the Hare Krishna movement, the International Society for Krishna Consciousness (ISKCON) belongs to the Gaudiya-Vaishnava sampradaya, a monotheistic tradition within Vedic, or Hindu, culture. It is based on the Bhagavad-gita, the spiritual teachings of Lord Krishna. According to tradition, this sacred text is over 5,000 years old and documents the conversation between Lord Krishna and his close friend and disciple Arjuna.

=== Shri Turant Nath Maharaj Temple ===
Shri Turant Nath Maharaj Temple is located in Sugar Factory Colony on SH-33, Badaun Road, Subhash Nagar. It is another Nath Temple in Nathnagari. It is said that if you will pray here with a clean heart, all your wishes will come true.

=== Shri Shirdi Sai Raksha Dham ===
This temple was built in 1997. Huge amount of devotees visit the temple everyday, particularly on Thursdays. Devotees celebrate all sorts of festivals with Sai Baba. A lot of activities take place all round the year like play based on Shri Sai Sachcharitra, maha abhishek, bhandara, dandia display, garba and many more. There is a charitable dispensary which is open for all six days a week. Apart from guiding people, the temple tries to revive the dying culture and has an aim of binding everyone as one family. The temple is located near Kodesia Fatak, Izzatnagar Bareilly.

=== Bara Bagh Hanuman Mandir ===
This was built in 1952. It is also known as Dakshin Mukhi Hanuman Mandir. Several thousand devotees visit Lord Hanuman every Tuesday and Saturday. Baba Ramdas blessed the temple and was the main person behind its establishment. It is managed by "Baba Ramdas Hanuman Mandir Trust" whose patron is Shri. S.K. Agarwal (Guruji), President is Shri. Rajesh Agarwal and Secretary is Architect Sumit Agarwal. Since last 60 years on its anniversary, 108 Shri Ram CharitrManas Navahan Paath are held. The campus has a Shiva Mandir with Narmadeshwar Shivling.

=== Pakaria Nath Temple ===
Pakaria Nath temple is another famous temple in Bareilly. It is placed in bhoor thana premnager.
