= List of largest temple tanks =

Temple tanks, traditionally known as “Theerthams,” “Pushkarnis,” or “Kulams”, are sacred water bodies associated with Hindu temples across India. These tanks not only serve as sources of water for ritual purification and ceremonies but also reflect the architectural grandeur and spiritual ethos of temple culture, especially in South India. Tamil Nadu is home to some of the largest and oldest temple tanks in the country, often serving as venues for important temple festivals like Theppam (Float Festival). These tanks are constructed with precise geometry and aligned with temple architecture, symbolizing the cosmic ocean in which divinity resides.

Among these, the Haridra Nadhi at Sri Vidhya Rajagopalaswamy Temple, Mannargudi, is considered the largest temple tank in India, spanning 23 acres, and is often referred to as the “Daughter of the Kaveri River.” Other notable tanks include Madurai Teppakulam, Kamalalayam in Tiruvarur, and Mahamaham Tank in Kumbakonam, each with its unique historical, architectural, and ritualistic significance.

The following is a list of the largest temple tanks in India, organized by area:

== List of large Temple tanks ==
Rank	Name	Image	Area acres	Area hectare	Location	Notes
1	Haridra Nadhi		23	9.3	Mannargudi, Tamil Nadu, India	The Rajagopalaswamy temple is a Vaishnavite shrine located in the town of Mannargudi, India.The temple is classified first among the 108 Abhimana Kshethrams of the Vaishnavate tradition The Haridra Nadhi tank at the entrance of the shrine where rain water is collected. The temple complex, comprising 16 gopurams, 7 prakarams(outer courtyard), 24 shrines, seven mandapams and nine sacred theerthams was the work was constructed by Kulothunga Chola I and later, renovated by the Later Cholas and the Thanjavur Nayaks. and This is the First Largest Temple Tank in Tamil Nadu as well as India. The area of the temple tank is 23 acres (93,000 m^{2}). It is also called Daughter of Kaveri river.
2	Madurai Teppakulam		16.2	6.6	Madurai, Tamil Nadu, India	This is the location where the king Thirumalai Naicker excavated the soil to fabricate the bricks required for constructing his palace, Thirumalai Nayakkar Mahal. The pit that was thus formed is seen as tank now.
3	Kamalalayam Temple Tank		16	6.5	Tiruvarur, Tamil Nadu, India	The ancient Sri Thyagaraja temple at Tiruvarur is dedicated to the Somaskanda aspect of Shiva. The Kamalalayam temple tank covers around 16 acres is one of the largest in the country. The temple chariot is the largest of its kind in Tamil Nadu.
4	Hritayathabhanasini Pushkarini		7.35	2.97	Tiruvallur, Tamil Nadu, India	The presiding deity Veeraraghava Perumal is believed to cure diseases of his devotees after taking bath in this Pushkarini and hence he is called "Vaithiya Veeraraghavan". Legend is that Lord Shiva got rid of his Brahmahathi Dosha (for killing Daksha) after worshipping Maha Vishnu Paramathma in this place. There is a small shrine for Shiva next to the temple tank. Lord Shiva took Bath in this temple tank called as Hritayathabhanasini which is located to the West of the temple and is believed to have medicinal effects. There is an ornate four pillared black stone hall called Vellikilamai mandapam where the festival image of the presiding deities are displayed every Friday.
5	Kapaleswarar Temple Tank		6	2.4	Chennai, Tamil Nadu, India	Kapaleeshwarar Temple (Tamil: கபாலீஸ்வரர் கோவில்) is temple of Shiva (Tamil: சிவா), located in Mylapore, which is in the Indian state of Tamil Nadu. The temple is of typical Dravidian architectural style, with the gopuram overpowering the street on which the temple sits. This temple is also a testimonial for the vishwakarmas sthapathis. There are two entrances to the temple marked by the gopuram on either side. The east gopuram is about 40 m high, while the smaller western gopuram faces the sacred tank.
6	Mahamaham tank, Kumbakonam		6.2	2.5	Kumbakonam, Tamil Nadu, India	The Tank is located in the heart of Kumbakonam town. This tank covers an area of 6.2 acres and is not a perfect rectangle. The tank is Surrounded by 16 small Mandapams and a "Nava Kannika Temple"(Nine rivers) in the Eastern Side. All the rivers of India are said to meet at the tank on Mahamaham festival day that happens once in 12 years. A purificatory bath at this tank on the day is considered equal to the combined dips in all the holy rivers of India.
7	Trichy Teppakulam		5	2.0	Trichy, Tamil Nadu, India	Teppakulam (Tamil: தெப்பக்குளம்) is a locality situated almost at the centre of the Indian city of Tiruchirappalli. The historic Rockfort is situated nearby. The Rock Fort temple stands 83m tall perched atop the rock. The smooth rock was first cut by the Pallavas but it was the Nayaks of Madurai who completed both the temples under the Vijayanagara Empire.
8	Tirukkanapuram Temple Tank		4.5	1.8	Tirukannapuram, Tamil Nadu, India|	The temple tank is right in front of Neela Megha Perumal Temple or Sowriraja Perumal Temple, a Hindu temple dedicated to Lord Vishnu located Tirukannapuram, Tamil Nadu, India on the Kumbakonam-Tiruvarur highway. It is one of the "Divya Desams", the 108 temples of Vishnu revered by the 12 poet saints, or Alwars.

== See also ==
- List of largest Hindu temples
- List of tallest gopurams
- List of human stampedes in Hindu temples
- Lists of Hindu temples
