= Vrindavan Chandrodaya Mandir =

Hindu temple under construction in Vrindavan, India

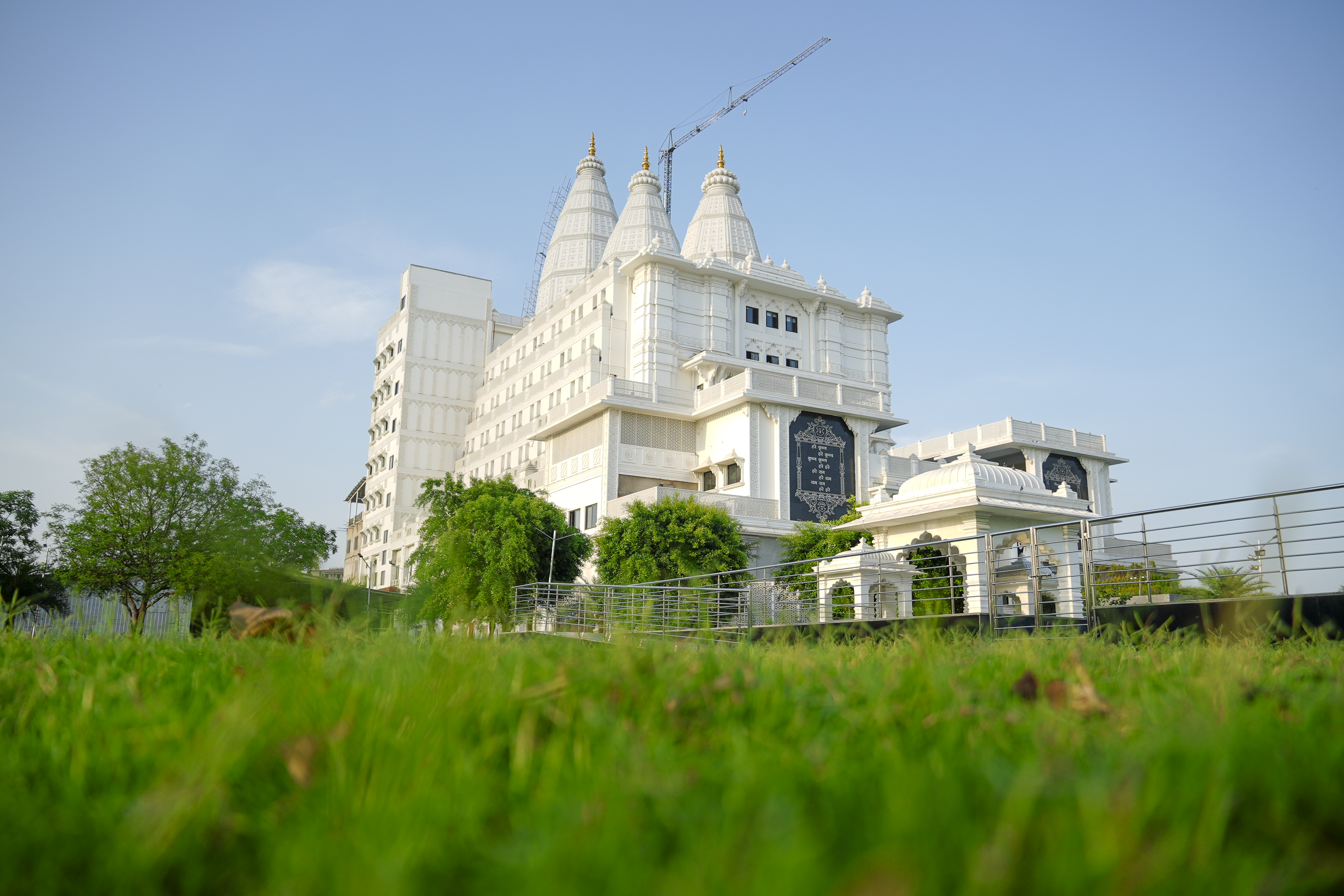
- Vrindavan Chandrodaya Mandir, the first phase of the Vrindavan Heritage Tower Project

- Location in Uttar Pradesh

Religion
- Affiliation: Hinduism
- District: Mathura
- Deity: Radha Krishna

Location
- Location: Vrindavan
- State: Uttar Pradesh
- Country: India
- Coordinates: 27.567776°N 77.644932°E

Architecture
- Type: Nagara architecture and Modern architecture
- Creator: ISKCON (International Society for Krishna Consciousness)
- Completed: December 2028
- Elevation: 2,213 m (7,260 ft)

Website
- vcm.org.in

Vrindavan Chandrodaya Mandir is a Hindu temple in early stages of construction at Vrindavan, Mathura, India. As planned, it will be the tallest religious monument in the world. The temple has been planned by the followers of Srila Prabhupada. The planned effort includes the temple rising to a height of about 210 metres (700 ft) or 75 floors and a built-up area of 50,000 square metres (540,000 sq ft). The project is set in 260 hectares (642 acres) of land and includes 4.9 hectares (12 acres) set aside for parking and a helipad.

== History ==
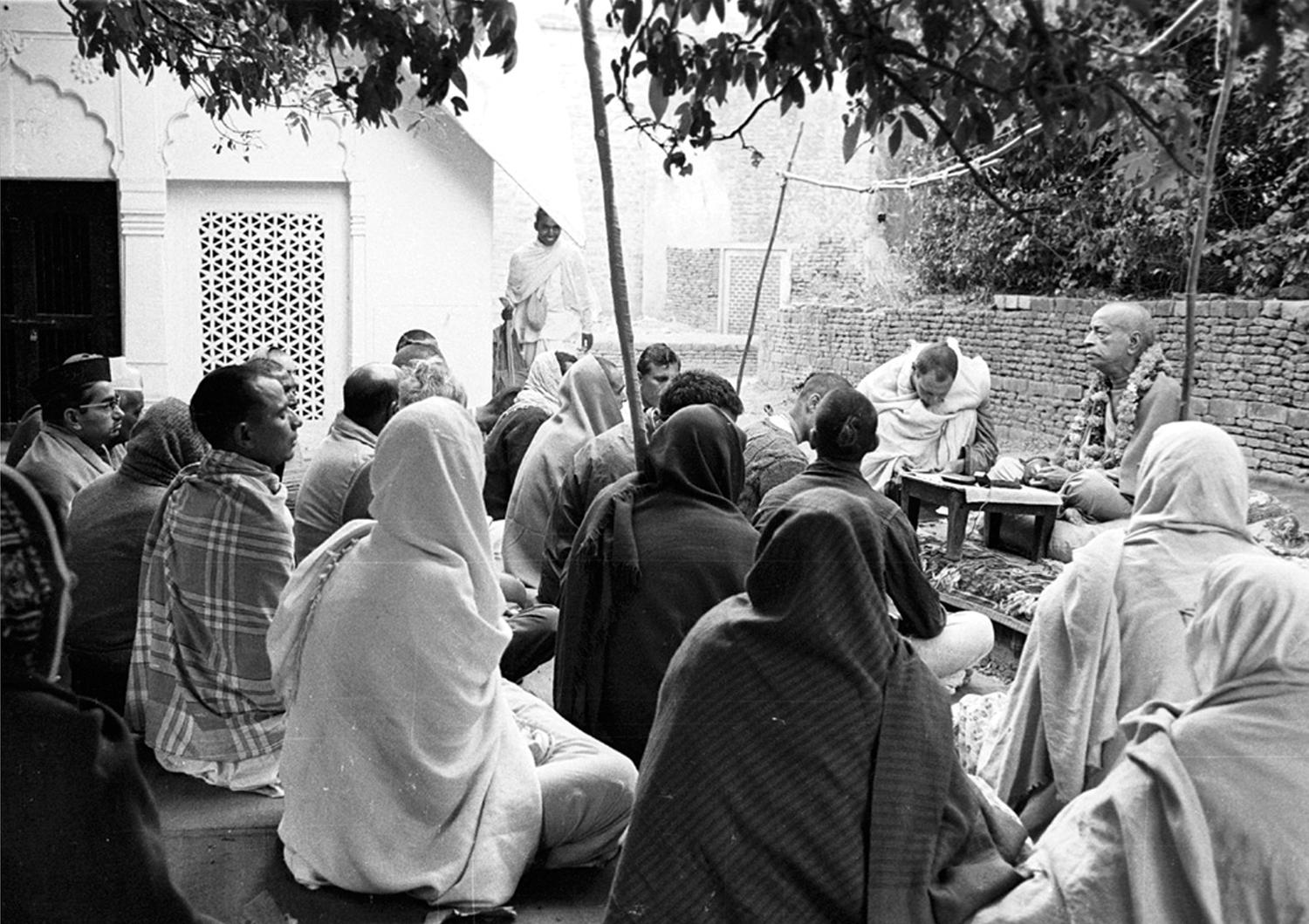
Srila Prabhupada in a lecture in front of Rupa Goswami Samadhi

In 1972, Srila Prabhupada, the founder and Acharya of ISKCON spoke about the principle of Yukta Vairāgya right in front of the Bhajan Kutir (a simple and austere dwelling of an ascetic primarily intended to perform his spiritual activities like chanting Krishna's names, writing and teaching) of Sri Rupa Goswami (see picture) to his dozen or more western disciples who were accompanying him on a visit to Vrindavan, India. He said:

Just like we have got a tendency to construct a skyscraper building. As in your country, you do. So you should not attached to the skyscraper building, but you can utilize the tendency by constructing a big temple like skyscraper for Krishna. In this way, you have to purify your material activities.

— Srila Prabhupada's lecture in Vrindavan, 29 October 1972

Inspired by this vision and statement of Srila Prabhupada, the devotees of ISKCON Bangalore, who strictly adhere to prabhupadas instructions conceived the Vrindavan Chandrodaya Mandir project to build a skyscraper temple for Lord Krishna.

The foundation stone laying ceremony of Chandrodaya temple in Mathura district was held on 16 March 2014, on the eve of Holi.

== Gallery ==
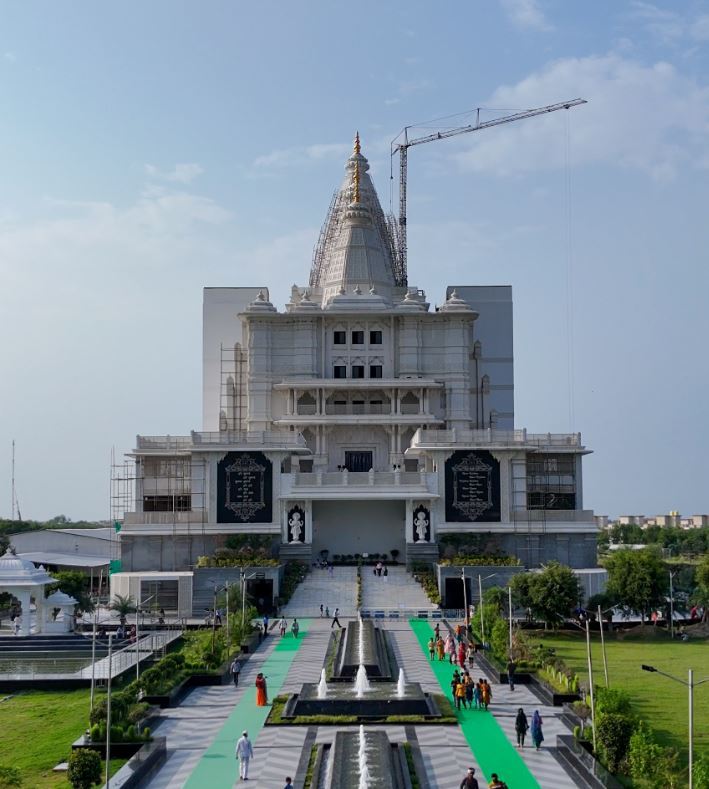
Under construction in 2025

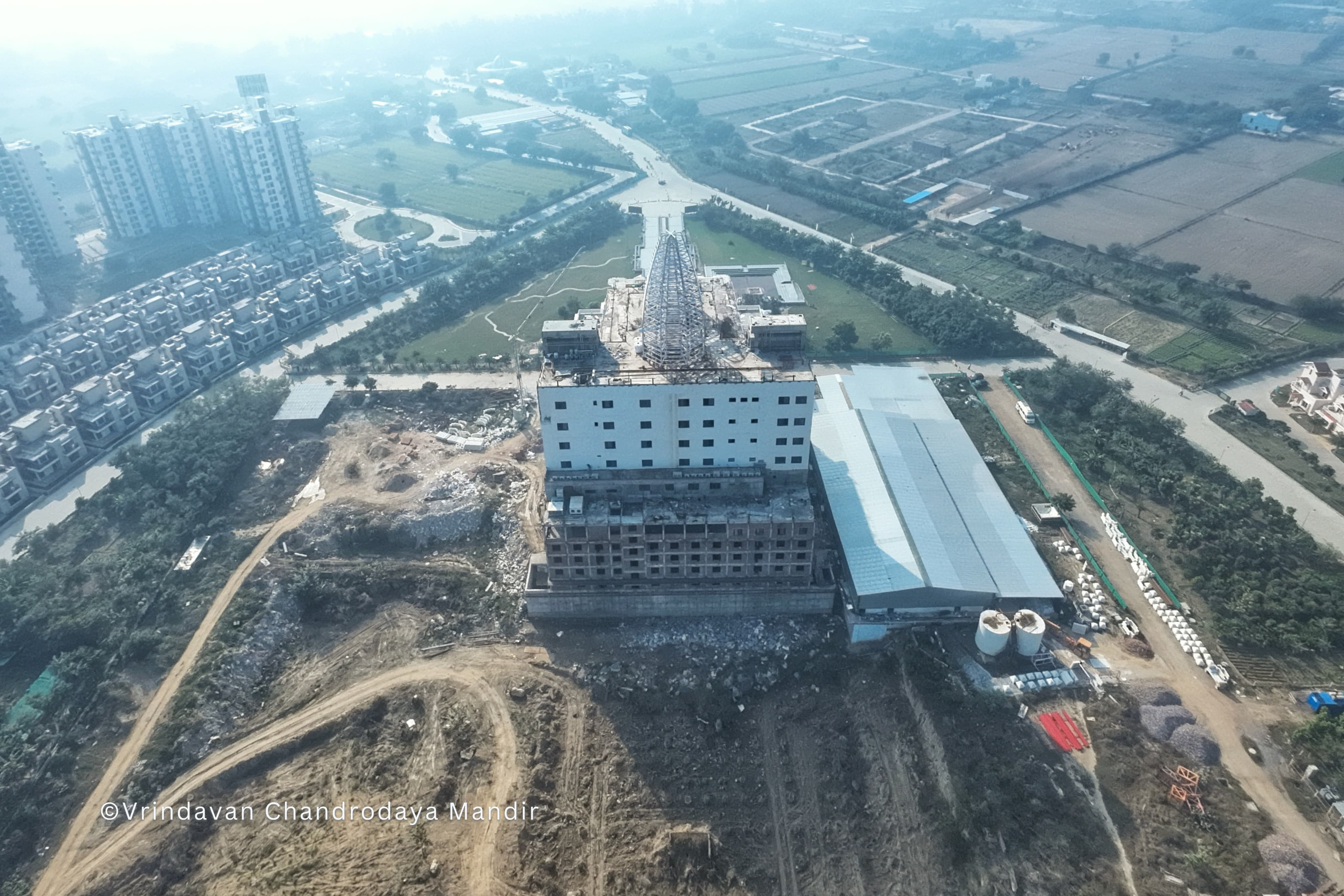
South Block View From Backside

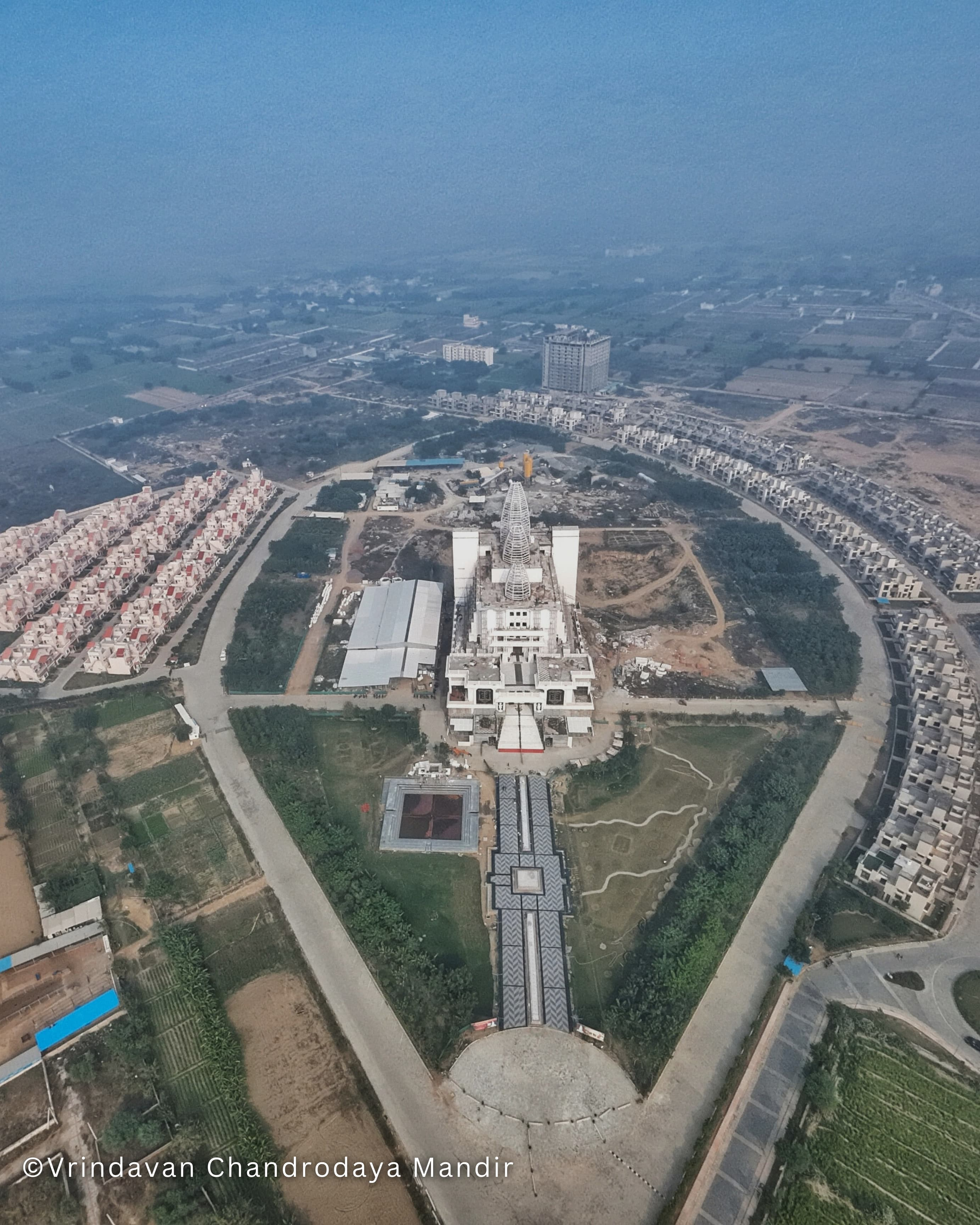
Top View of Upcoming South Block

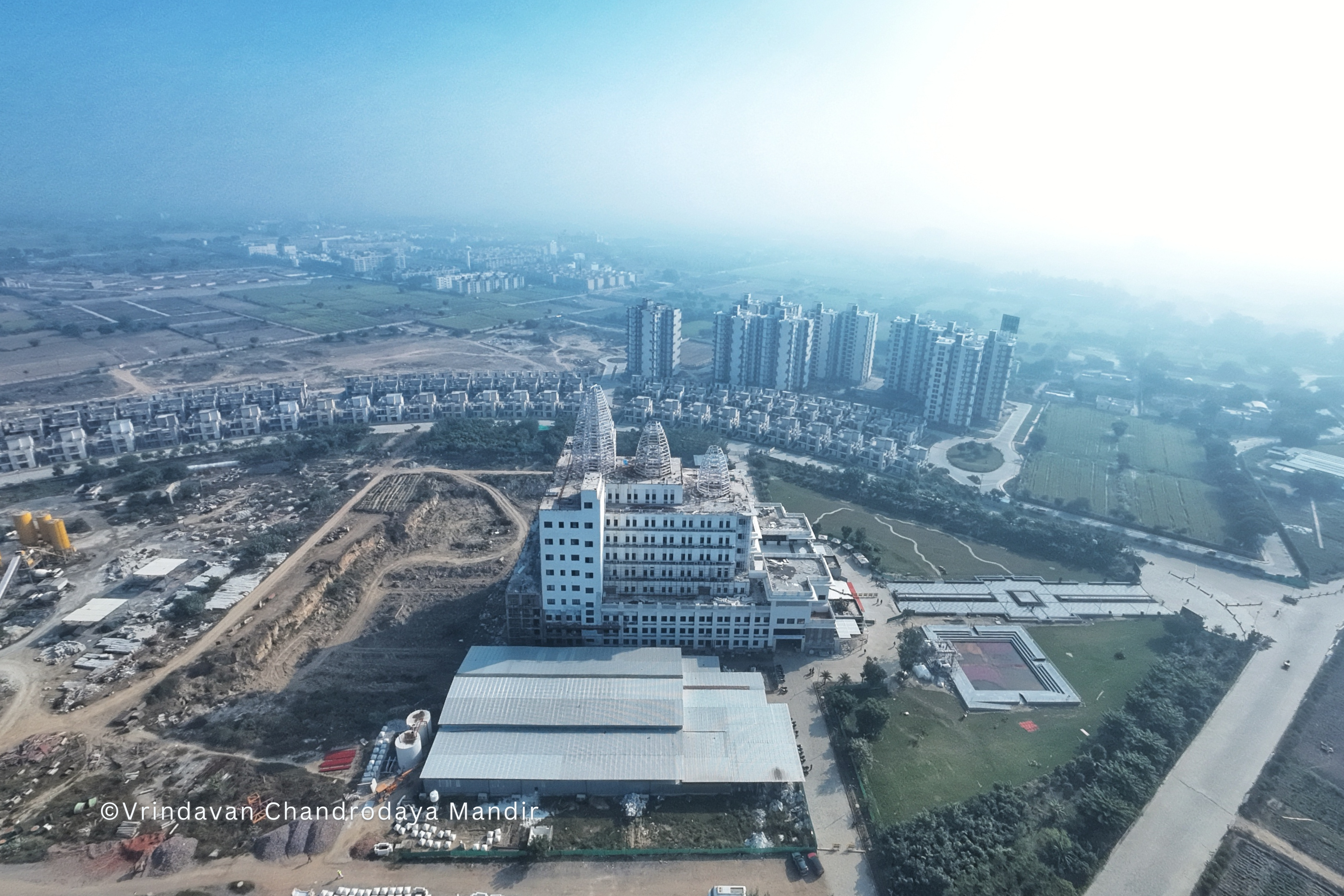
The South Block's top view from the east side

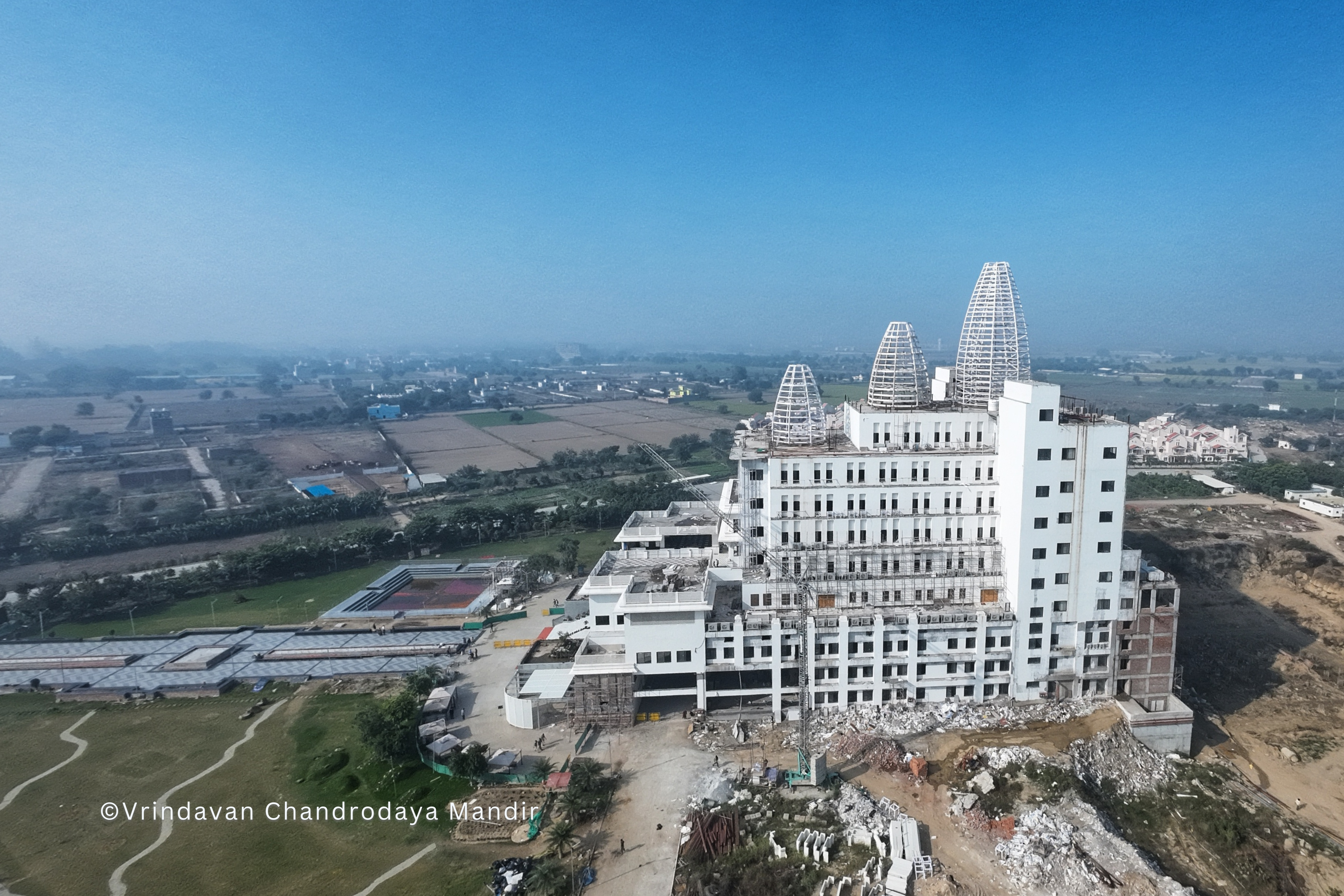
South Block View From West Side

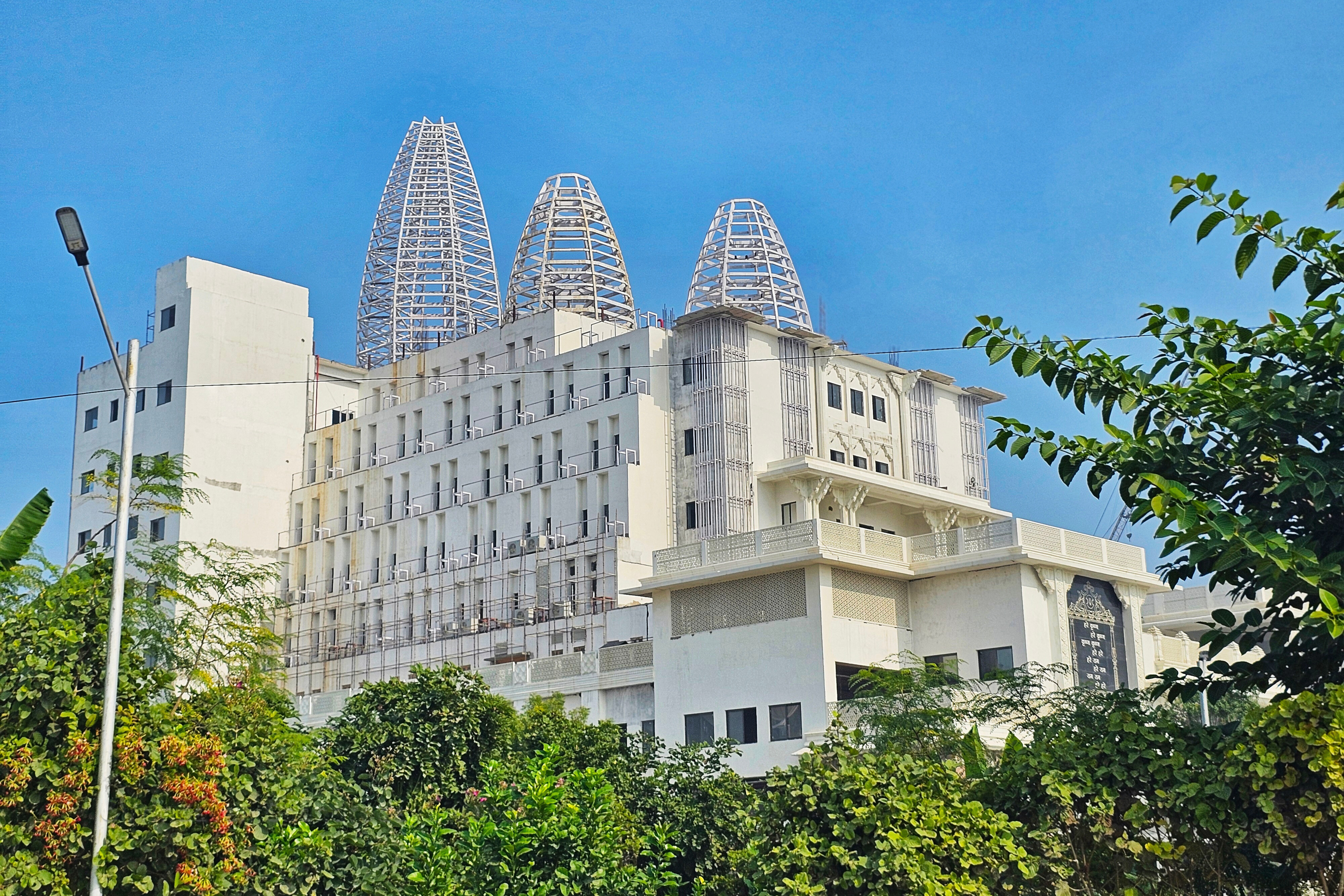
South Block

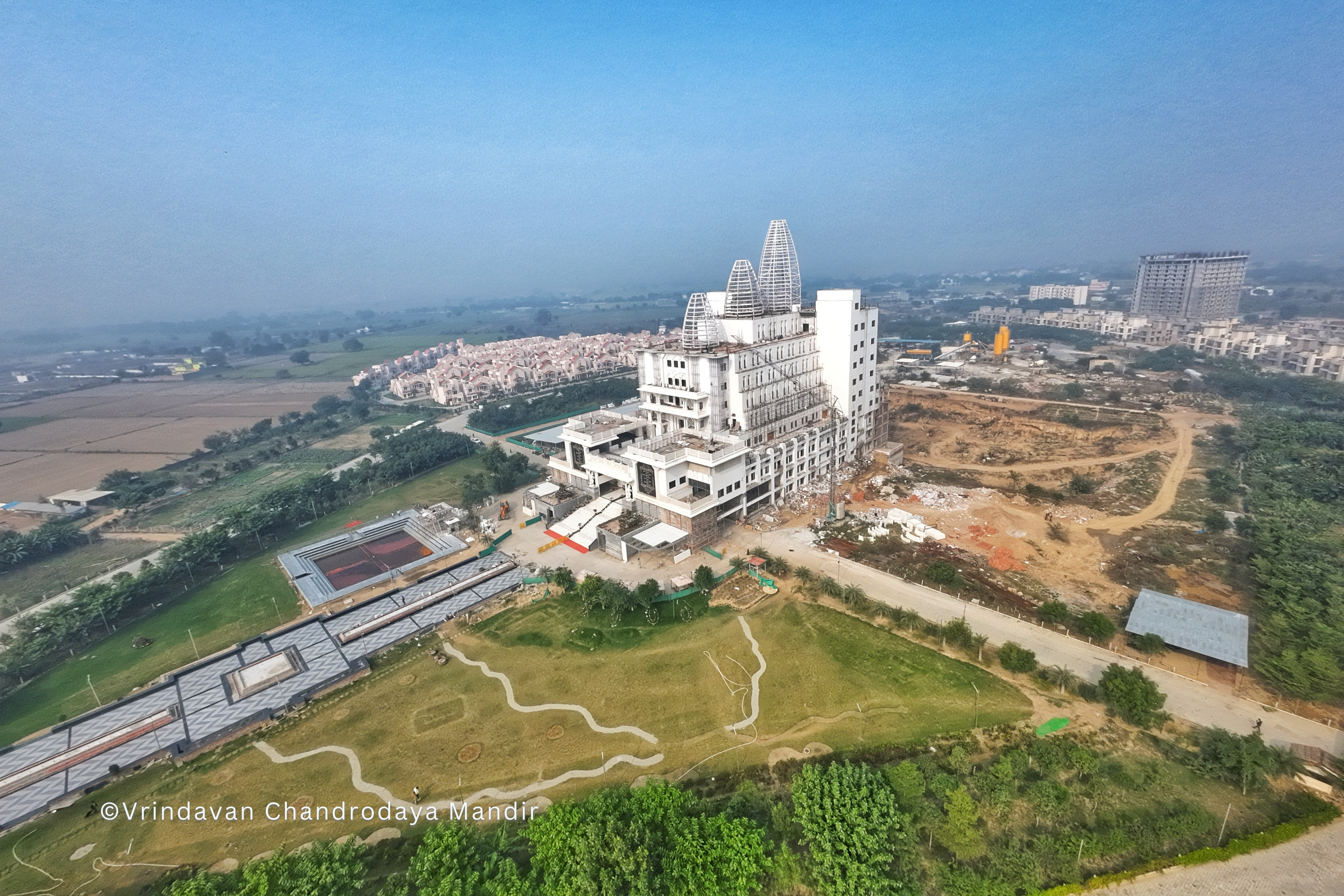
South Block top view

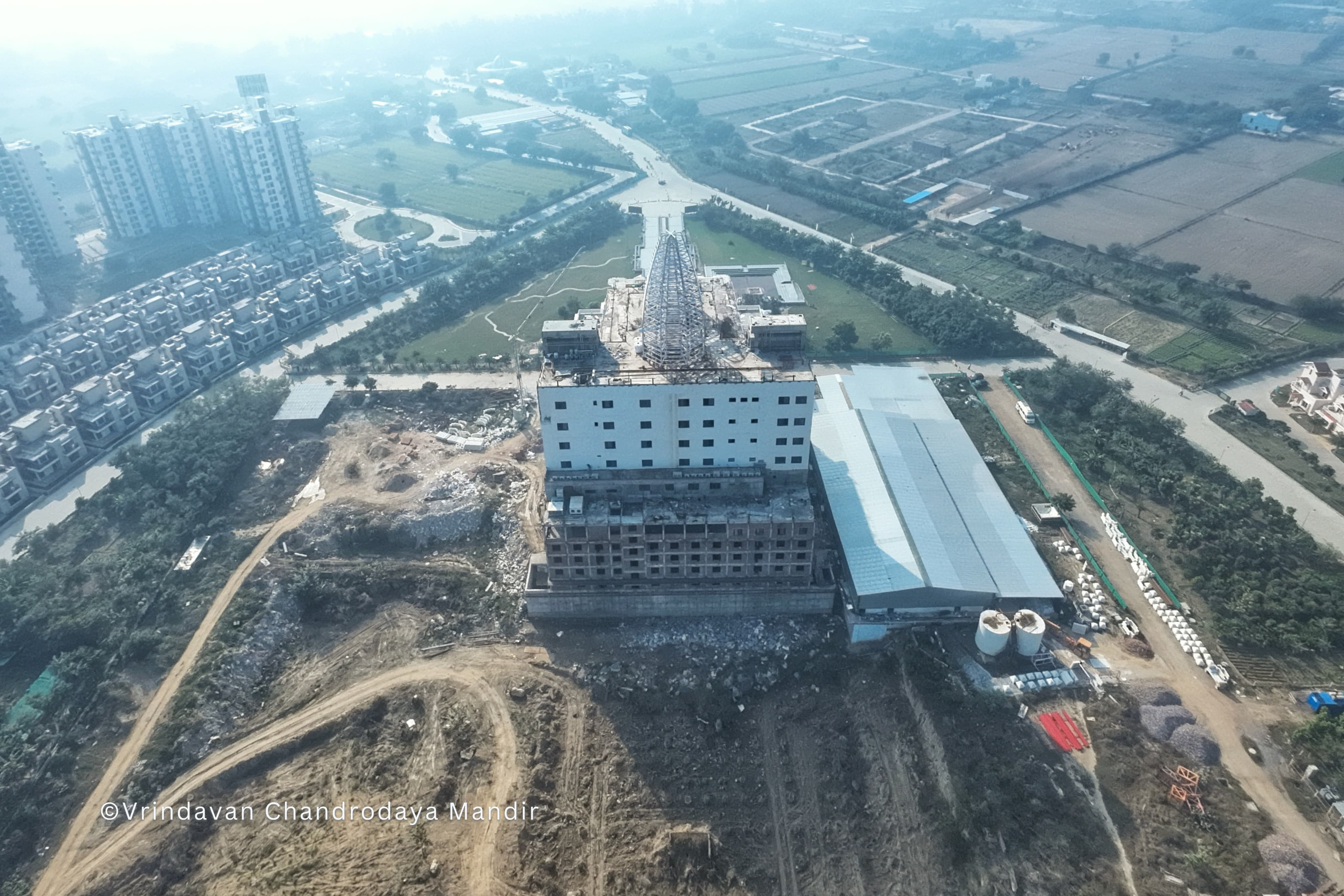
South Block backside view

== Current status ==
- 2025 Sep: Expected completion is in 2028.
