= List of Hindu temples in Bihar =

The following is a list of Hindu temples in the state of Bihar in India by deity.

== Ganesh temples ==
- Ganesh temples, Rohtas

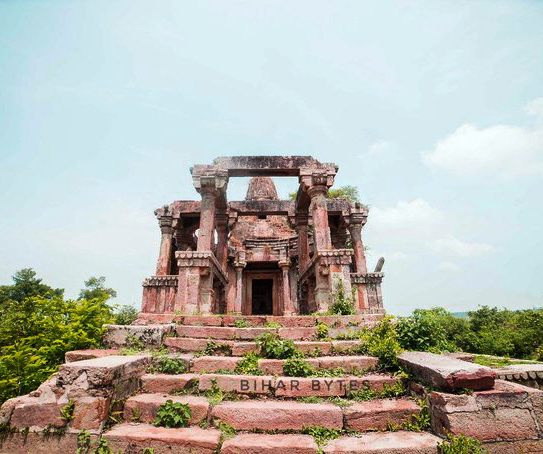
Ganesh temple in Rohtasgarh fort

== Hanumana temple ==
- Mahavir Mandir, Patna
- Mahavir Balaji Temple
- Shri Sankatmochan Hanuman Mandhir, Dighra
- Hanuman Mandir, Kalambagh Chowk
- Patal Hanuman Mandir, Sahu Pokhar, Muzaffarpur

== Krishna temple ==
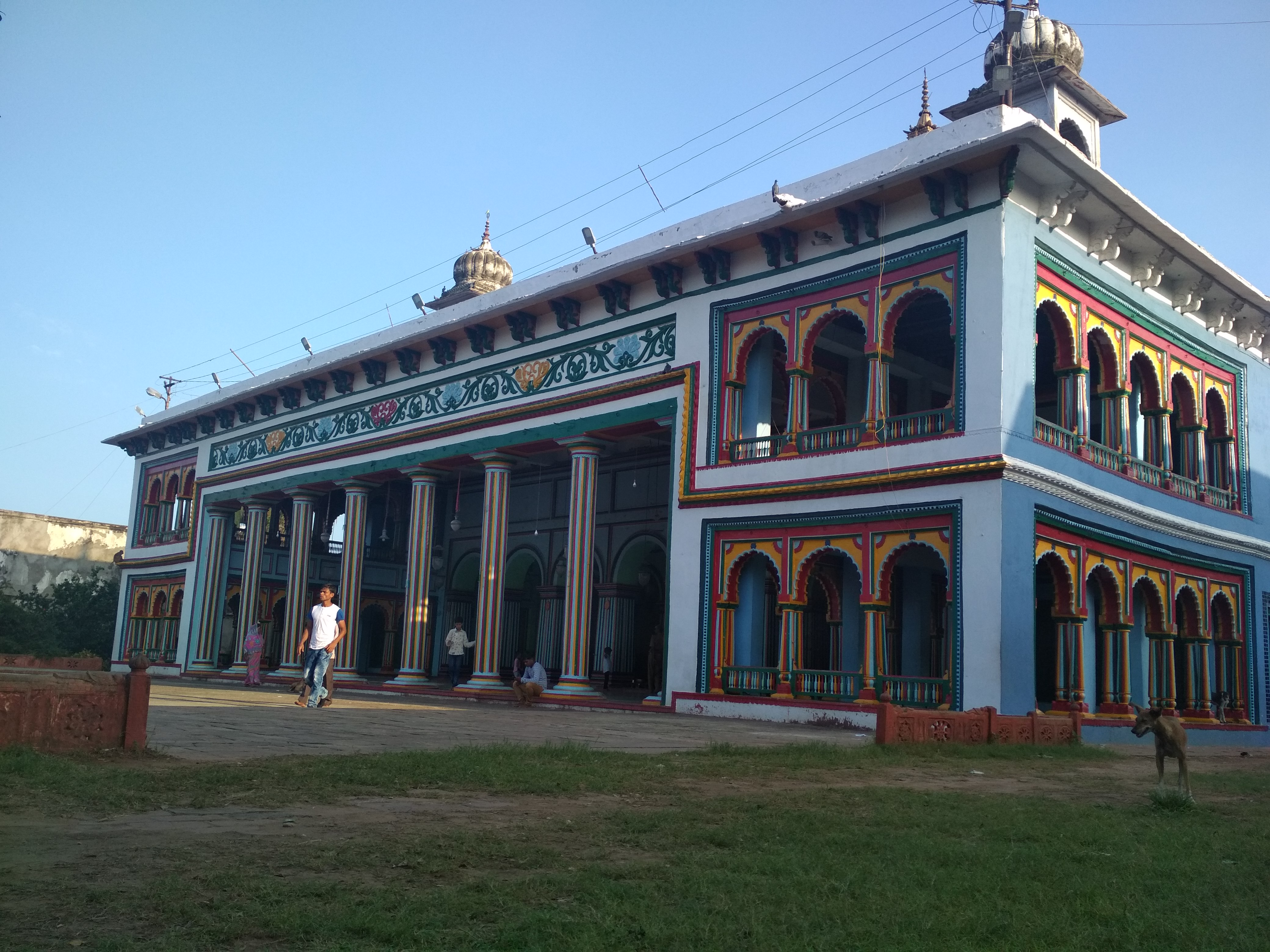
Bihariji Temple, Dumraon

- Bihariji temple, dumraon, Buxar
- ISKCON Temple Patna
- Gopal Mandir, Gopalganj

== Rama temple ==
- Viraat Ramayan Mandir
- Ramchaura Mandir, Hajipur
- Naulakha Temple, Bishanpur, Begusarai district
- Shri Ram Jaanki Temple, Sri Ram Nagar, Near New Police Line Rd, Brahmpura, Muzaffarpur district

== Shiva temple ==
Shiva Temples

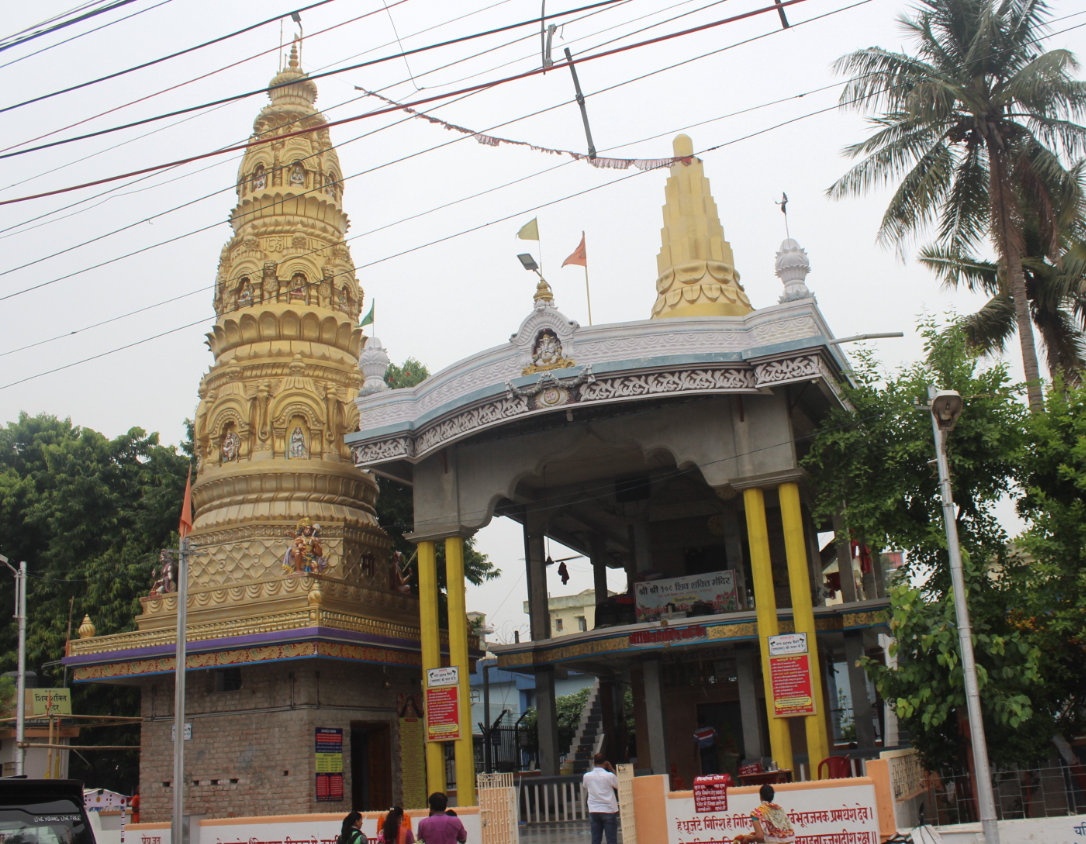
Shiv Shakti Temple, Bhagalpur

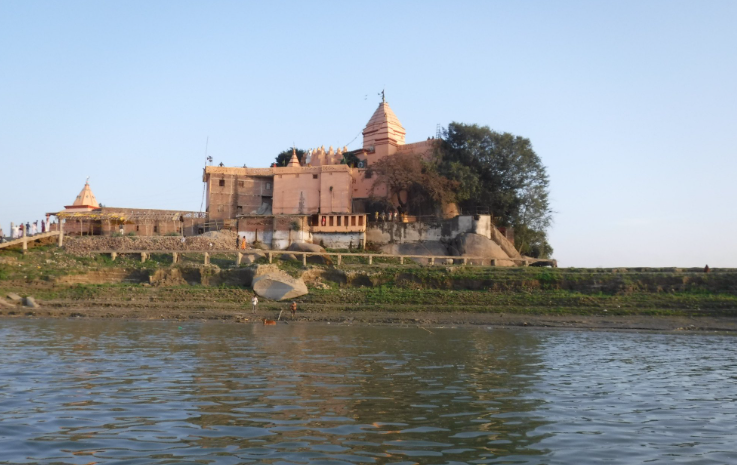
Ajgaibinath Temple, Bhagalpur

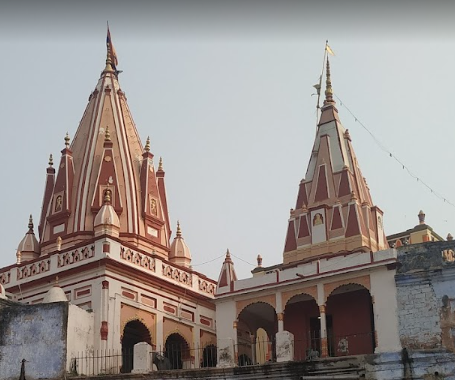
Budhanath Temple, Bhagalpur

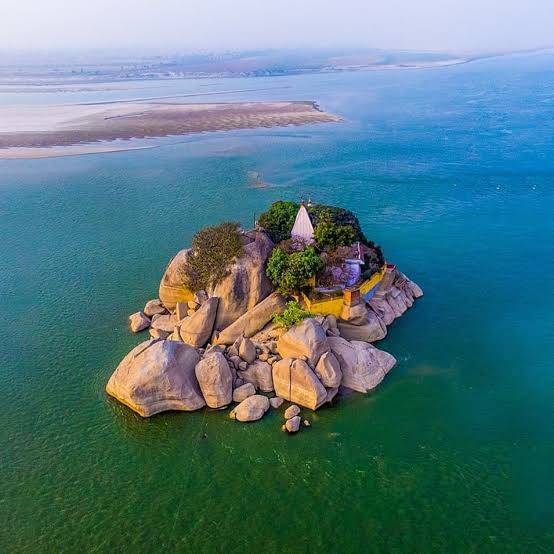
Shanti Baba Mandir in the mid of Ganga, Kahalgaon, Bhagalpur

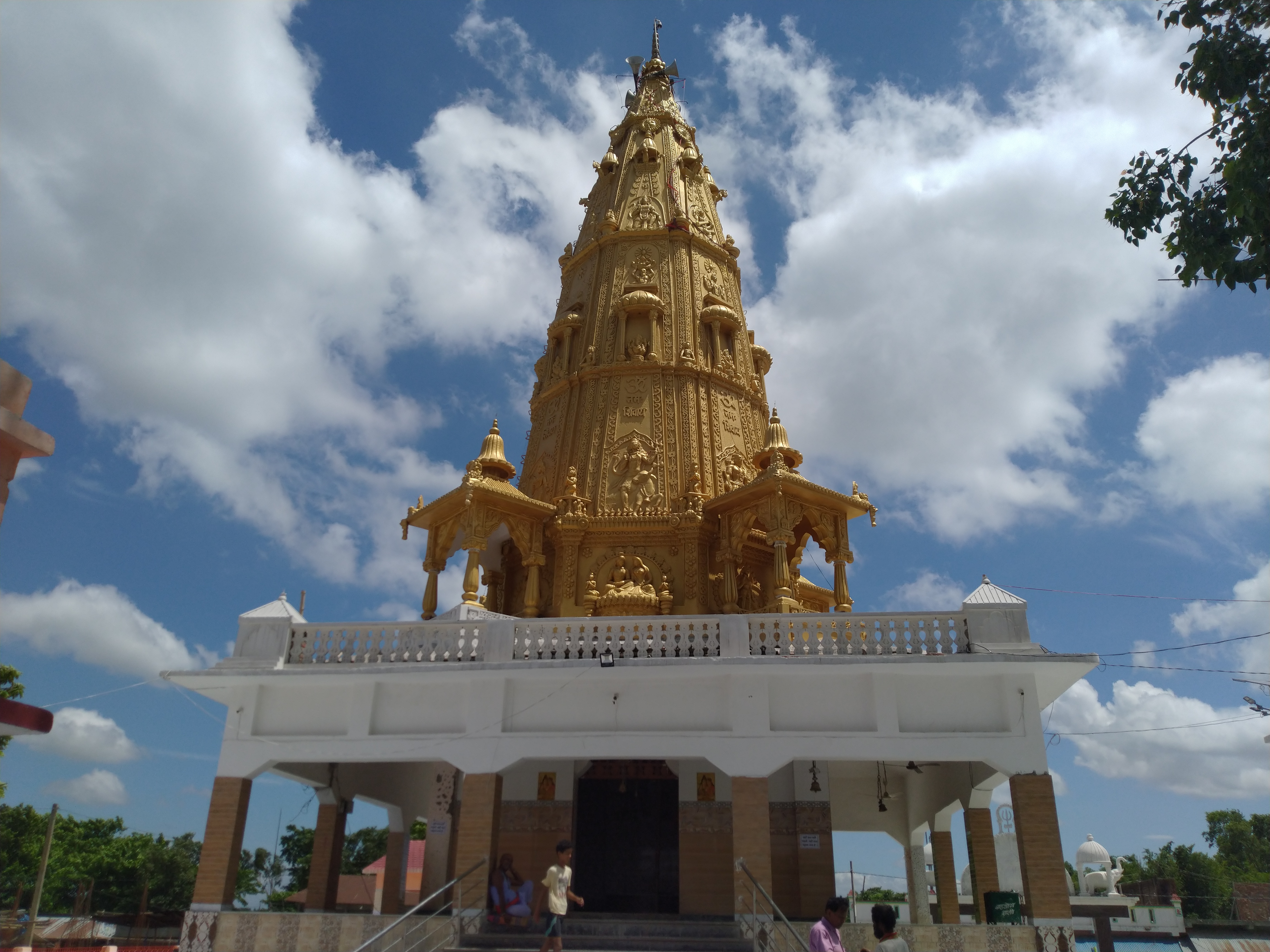
Sundernath Temple, Araria

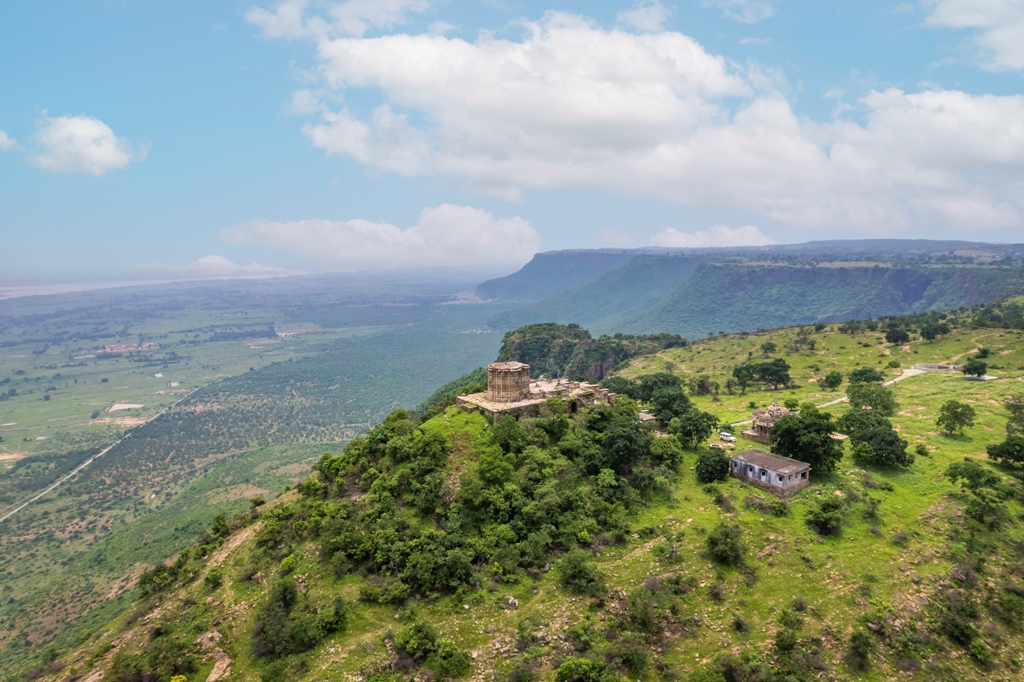
Chaurasan temple, Rohtas
- Sundarnath Temple, Araria
- Budhanath Temple, Bhagalpur
- Bhimshankar Temple, Dharahara, Raghopur
- Ajgaibinath Temple, Sultanganj
- Shiv Shakti Temple, Bhagalpur
- Sri Bhoothnath Mandir, Bhagalpur
- Bateshwar Sthan, Bhagalpur
- Shanti Baba Temple, Bhagalpur
- Shri Adinath Akhara, Buxar
- Mittheswarnath Shiv Temple, Darbhanga
- Ugna Mahadev Temple, East Champaran
- Ashokdham Temple, Lakhisarai
- Kapileshwar Temple, Madhubani
- Rameshwarnath Temple, Madhubani
- Ugna Mahadev Mandir, Madhubani
- Parasmaninath Temple, Madhubani
- Baba Garib Sthan Mandir, Muzaffarpur
- Nair temple, Patna
- Chaurasan temple, Rohtas
- Thaneshwar Temple Samastipur
- Khudneshwar Dham Samastipur
- Khudneshwar Asthan Morwa, Samastipur
- Singheshwar Sthan, Singheshwar, Madhepura
- Mahendra Nath Temple, Siwan
- Harshiteshwar Shiv Temple, Madhwapur, Siwan
- Chaumukhi Mahadev, Vaishali
- Lal Keshwar Shiv Temple, Vaishali
- Pataleshwar Mandir, Vaishali

== Shakti temple ==
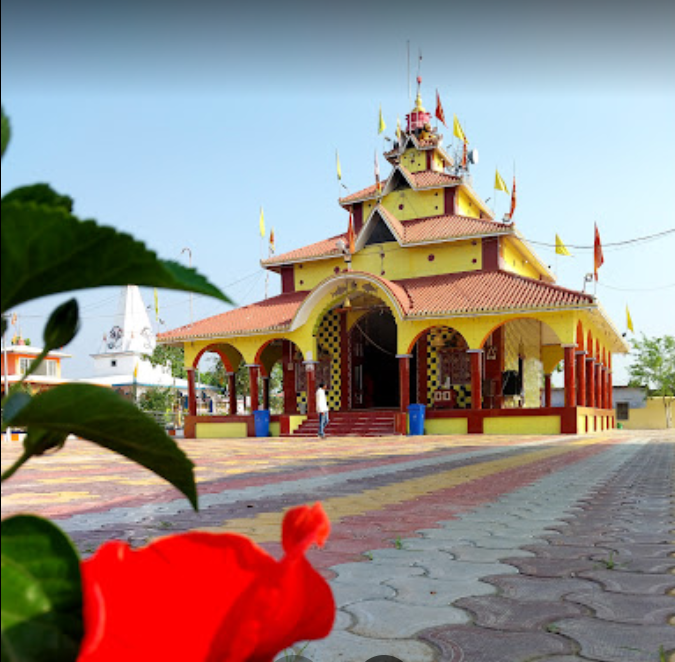
Maa Jaleshwari Temple, Bhagalpur

- Tetri Durga Mandir, Bhagalpur
- Ahalya Sthan, Darbhanga
- Shyama Mai Temple, Darbhanga
- Kankali Mata Temple, Darbhanga
- Mangla Gauri Temple, Gaya
- Thawe mandir, Gopalganj
- Mundeshwari Temple, Kaimur
- Chandika Sthan, Munger
- Shitala Mata Temple, Patna
- Patan Devi, Patna
- Maa Tara Chandi Temple, Rohtas
- Aami Mandir, Saran
- Sita Kund, Sitamarhi
- Budhi Mai, Vaishali
- Jaimangla Gadh Temple, Begusarai
- Maa Raj Rajeshwari Devi Mandir, Muzaffarpur
- Maa Baglamukhi Mandir, Muzaffarpur

== Sun temple ==
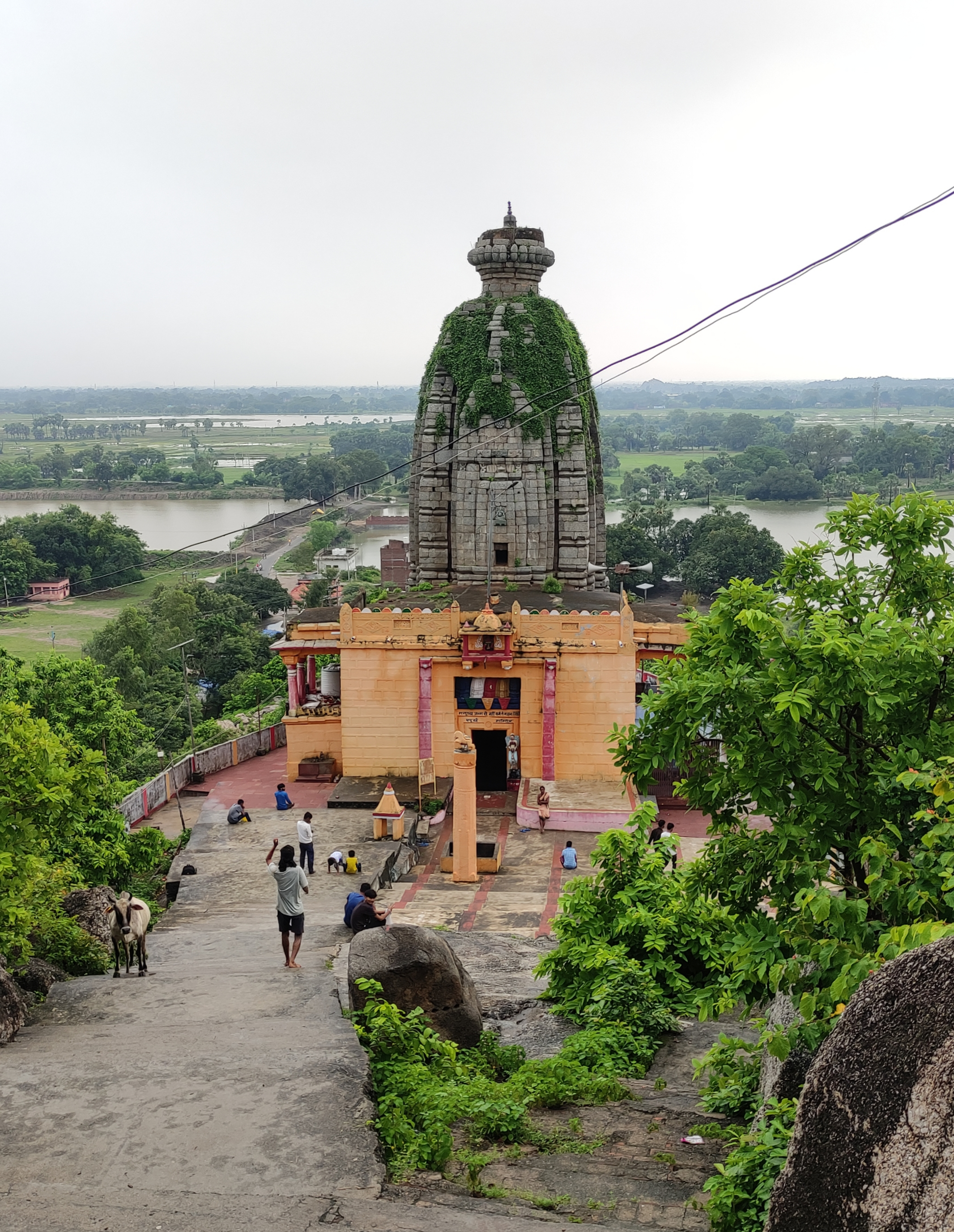
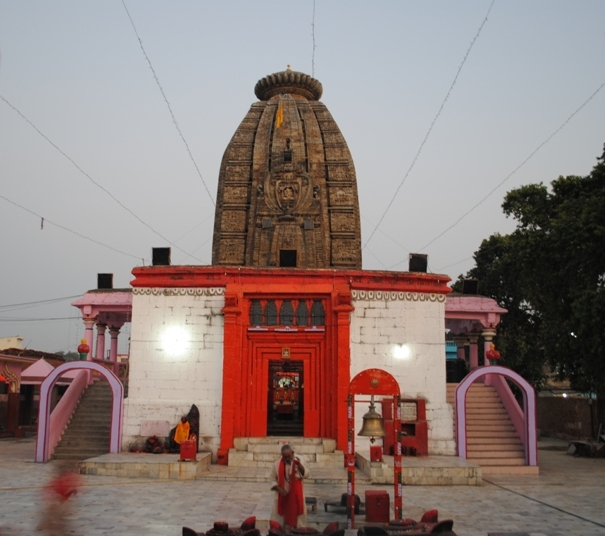
Right to left: Umga sun temple, Deo sun temple
- Deo Surya Mandir
- Umga Sun Temple

== Vishnu temple ==
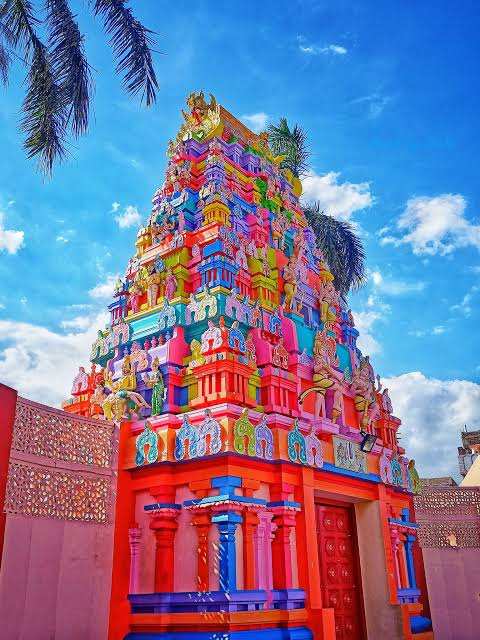
Naulakha temple, Charitavana

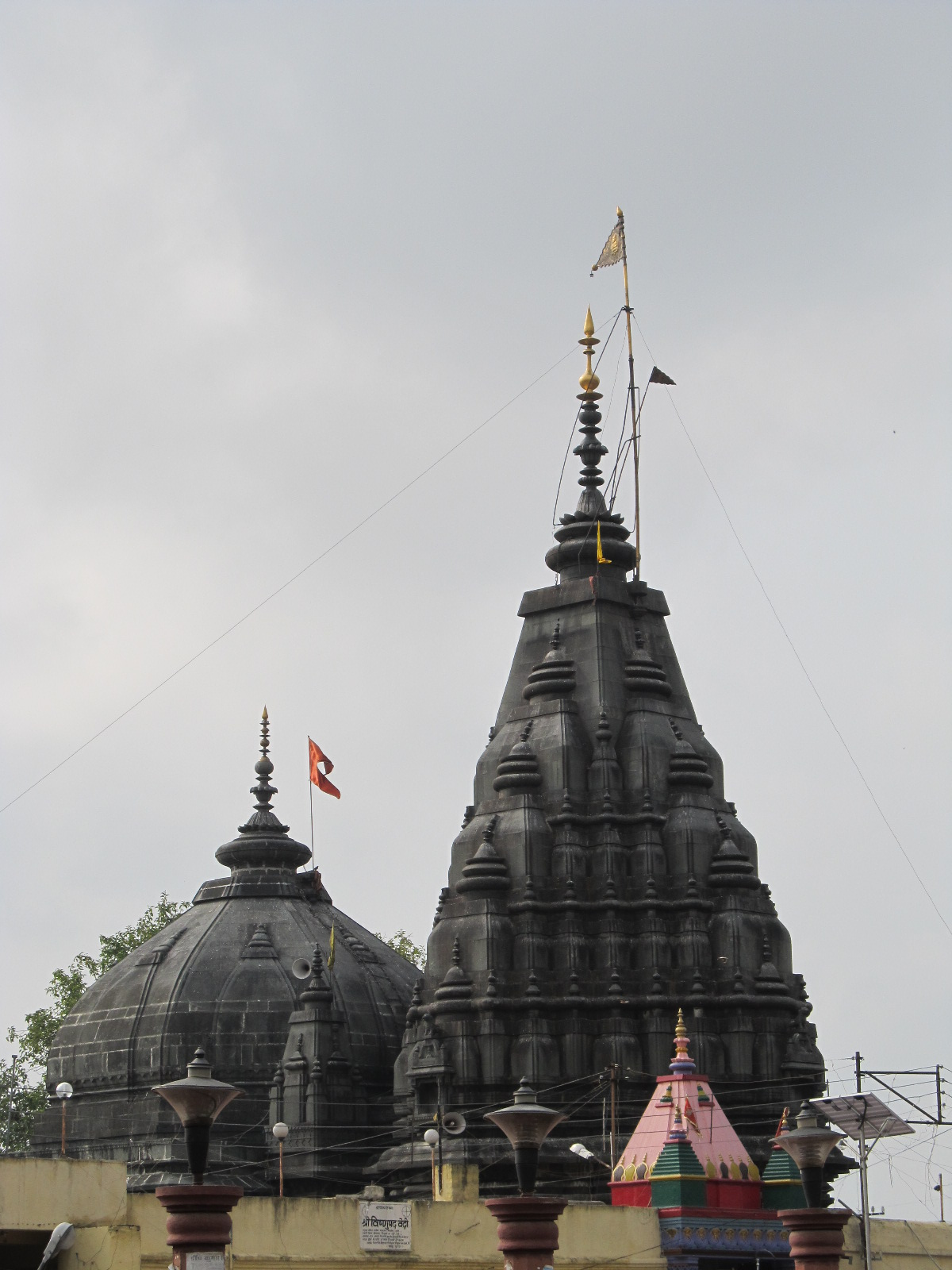
Vishnupad temple, Gaya

- Vishnu Temple, Ganpatganj, Raghopur
- Naulakha temple, Charitavana, Buxar
- Vishnupad temple, Gaya
- Vishnudham temple, Siwan district
- Vishnudham mandir, Supaul
- Hariharnath temple, Sonpur, Bihar
- Sri Vishnu Dham, Barbigha, Sheikhpura
- Chaturbhuj Sthan Mandir, Muzaffarpur
- Lakshmi Narayana Mandir (Birla Mandir),Patna

== Other temples ==
- Bari Sangat Bihar
- Temples of Umga hill
