= Vishnudham Mandir =

Hindu temple in India

- Hindi: विष्णुधाम मंदिर

Religion
- Affiliation: Hinduism
- District: Siwan District
- Deity: Vishnu

Location
- State: Bihar
- Country: India
- Interactive map of Vishnudham Mandir
- Coordinates: 26°06′52.1″N 84°35′52.4″E

Architecture
- Type: Dravidian architecture
- Established: 1998

Vishnudham Mandir is a Hindu temple on the border of the villages of Bherwania and Sadiha in Siwan district, Bihar, India. The idol of Vishnu, which was placed in the garbhagriha of the temple, was found by a carpenter underneath a tree in 1998. The temple was constructed in Dravidian architecture by local villagers and authorities.

It is one of the largest idols of Vishnu in North India, made of black granite and measuring 7.5 feet (2.3 m) long and 3.5 feet (1.1 m) wide. The idol belongs to the Gupta period. The idol has four arms carrying a sankh, a chakra, a gada, and a lotus flower. There are two figures – one masculine and another feminine – below the left and right arms of the idol. An idol of the Hindu goddess Laxmi was also recovered from the same spot, but it was stolen.

== See also ==
- Vishnu Temple, Ganpatganj
