= Bhimshankar Temple =

Hindu temple in India

- Bhim Shankar Temple, Dharahara, Raghopur

Religion
- Affiliation: Hinduism
- District: Supaul district
- Deity: Shiva

Location
- Location: Dharahara Village, Raghopur
- State: Bihar
- Country: India
- Interactive map of Bhimshankar Temple
- Coordinates: 26.2625391°N 86.8343594°E

Architecture
- Completed: 1930 (renovated)
- Elevation: 62 m (203 ft)

Bhimshankar Temple (Hindi: भीमशंकर मंदिर), also known as Dharahara Mahadev Mandir and Bhimshankar Mahadev Sthan, is a Hindu temple, dedicated to the lord Shiva. This temple is located at Dharahara village, near Raghopur, Supaul district, Bihar, India. There is no factual evidence of the establishment of this temple, but it is believed that the temple has existed since the Mahabharata period. The temple was renovated in the 20th century.

The number of devotees turned higher during festivals like Maha Shivaratri, Shraavana, Naga Panchami, Kartik Purnima.

== Architecture ==
The temple's architectural style is Tirhut Shikhara, a widely used style in the Hindu temple architecture of Mithila.

== Location ==
It is located 35 kilometres (22 mi) south of district headquarter Supaul, and 260 kilometres (160 mi) southwest of state capital Patna. The temple is situated in Dharahara village of Raghopur block.
