= Bari Sangat Bihar =

Hindu temple in India

Bari Sangat Vaishali Bihar
- Location in Bihar

Religion
- Affiliation: Hinduism
- District: Vaishali

Location
- Location: Helabazar/Rambhadar, Hajipur
- State: Bihar
- Country: India
- Interactive map of Bari Sangat Vaishali Bihar
- Coordinates: 25°40′N 85°13′E

Architecture
- Type: Indian
- Creator: Raajaputra "for Saints and Brahmans"
- Completed: During Ancient India

Website
- N/A

The Bari Sangat - Helabazar is a Hindu Sangat in the city of Hajipur, Bihar, India. It is said to have been built during the reign of the Ancient Indian civilization.

This sanctimonious place was visited by many saints in ancient period to offer prayers, and it still has pious meaning to Hindu and Saints to this day, being a destination for traveling devotees of Lord Rama and Lord Krishna.

Sangat is a Hindu term with its origin in the Sanskrit word 'sangh', which means company, fellowship and association. In Hindu or Sanatan vocabulary, the word has a special connotation. It stands for the body of men and women who meet religiously, especially in the presence of the Guru or Saints.

== See also ==
- List of Hindu temples in India
- Hajipur
