= Khudneshwar Asthan Morwa =

Hindu temple in India

Khuseshwar Asthan, Morwa
- Location within Bihar

Religion
- Affiliation: Hinduism
- District: Samastipur District
- Deity: Shiva
- Festivals: Mahashivratri, Shravani Mela,

Location
- State: Bihar
- Country: India
- Coordinates: 25.812°N 85.692°E

Architecture
- Type: Mandir
- Creator: Narhan Estate
- Completed: 1858
- Temple: 4

Khudneshwar Asthan is a Hindu temple devoted to Lord Shiva located 17 kilometers southwest of the Samastipur district headquarters of Bihar, India.

The name of the temple was inherited from a Muslim woman named Khudni who found the Lingam at this location and became a devotee of Lord Shiva. Her mortal remains were buried one yard south beside the Lingam under the same temple roof.

== History ==
During the British Empire, Narhan estate built this temple in 1858 and appointed a priest as a caretaker. Devotees flock there year round, but especially during its annual festival of Maha Shivratri and in the month of Shravan, crowds emerge for darshana and worship. In 2008 Bihar Religious Trust Board Chairman Kishore Kunal provided financial assistance from the board and announced it to be developed for tourists to demonstrate Hindu-Muslim unity.

== Legend ==
In the 14th century the temple site was covered by dense forest and was used mainly for grazing cattle. Khudni often went there for grazing her cow. One day while returning home after grazing, she tried milking her cow but received no milk. This continued for several days. One day while grazing, the cow left her sight. She found the cow and was astonished to see her cow shedding milk. She ran to the village to relate her discovery. The local people cleared the ground and started digging, only to find a Lingam. After her death her remains were buried beside the Lingam. They erected a temple that they named "Khudneshwar Asthan" inherited from the name of the Muslim woman Khudni Biwi.
