= Budhanath Temple =

Hindu Temple in Bhagalpur, Bihar, India

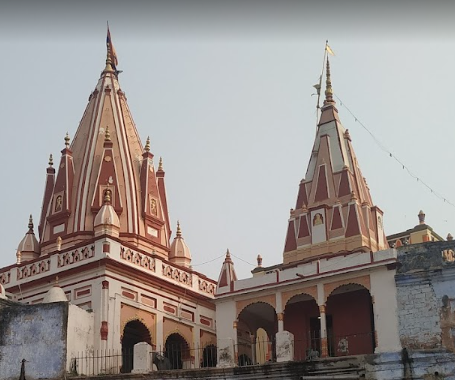

- Location in Bihar

Religion
- Affiliation: Hinduism
- District: Bhagalpur district
- Deity: Vriddheshwarnath (Budhanath)
- Festival: Maha Shivratri
- Governing body: Baba Budhanath Mandir Committee

Location
- Location: Adampur, Bhagalpur
- State: Bihar
- Country: India
- Coordinates: 25°15′17.1″N 86°58′29.5″E

Architecture
- Type: Vedic-Style
- Creator: Vashishth Muni
- Established: Treta Yuga
- Monument: 2

Budhanath Temple, also known as Vriddheshwarnath or Baba Bal Vridheshwarnath Temple, is a revered Hindu Temple dedicated to Lord Shiva perched on the banks of the Uttarvahini Ganga (a rare northward‑flowing stretch of the Ganges) in Jogsar (Adampur), Bhagalpur. Widely believed to date back to Treta Yuga, it is counted among the 108 Nath temples of India mentioned in the Shiva Purana.

== Etymology ==
Budhanath or Bal Vridheswarnath is one of 108 Nath in India. It is mentioned in the twelfth chapter of Shiva Purana. It is believed that the Shiva Lingam is Swayambhu (self-manifested), consecrated by Sage Vashishtha during Satya Yuga, though its origin remains unknown.

== Architecture and temple complex ==
Spread over roughly 3 acres, the temple complex includes deities of Goddess Durga, Radha‑Krishna, Hanuman, Parvati, and a Nandi statue alongside the main Shivlinga. Built in a localized Nagara‑style architecture, the temple is known more for its spiritual ambiance than grand architecture; imagery and statues date from around 1937, but much of the structure is traditional in design.

A shrine for Maa Bhavani stands beside it, and local tradition holds that the idol came floating down from Munger via the Ganga.

== Festivals and rituals ==
- Key observances: Maha Shivaratri, the month of Shravan, and Tuesdays and Saturdays are especially auspicious. During Shravan, the temple attracts over a million devotees, who perform Rudrabhishek (Abhisheka of Rudra) and Jalabhishek rituals along the Ganga ghats.
- During Durga Puja, the temple is beautifully decorated. Notably, for three generations, a Muslim family has performed morning‑evening shehnai music during the festival, showcasing Ganga‑Jamuni communal harmony.
- Every year, a large Kanwar Yatra departs from the temple to Baba Basukinath Dham, involving hundreds of devotees carrying water from the Ganga. Massive crowds gather, reportedly exceeding one million worshippers during peak periods.
- Budhanath Ghat adjoining from the temple complex lies of on the bank of Uttarvahini Ganga. The ghat serves as a primary point for devotees to engage in sacred rituals connected with the temple’s religious activities.

== Cultural and regional Context ==
Bhagalpur, historically known as Champanagari (Capital of Anga region), hosts a vibrant Angika culture, with a rich tradition of folk rituals and festivals. The Budhanath Temple contributes significantly to this cultural tapestry as a religious landmark of Anga’s legacy and a focal point for regional identity.

=== Visitor information ===
- Typically open daily, with morning to evening visiting hours (often 5 AM to 9 or 10 PM). Visitors are advised to dress modestly and request permission before photographing inside the main shrine.

== Location and access ==
The temple is located about 1.6 km from Bhagalpur Railway Station, approximately a 10–20 minute rickshaw or auto ride from the station via Khalifabagh Market Road and Budhanath Road . Deoghar Airport is the nearest functional airport to Budhanath especially for people from south side of Bihar and Patna Airport is second nearest prioritized for north of Bihar.

== See also ==
- Ghats in Bhagalpur
- Maa Jaleshwari Temple
- Ajgaibinath Temple
- Shiv Shakti Temple
