= Vishnu Temple, Ganpatganj =

Hindu temple in Ganpatganj

Vishnu Temple
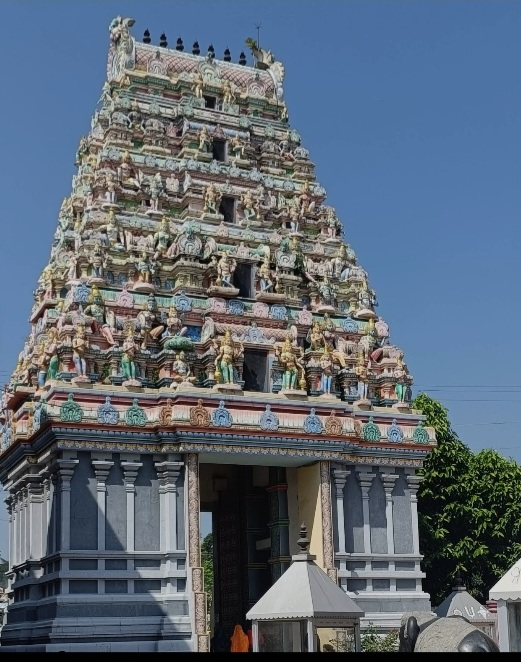
- Vishnu Temple in Ganpatganj

Religion
- Affiliation: Hinduism
- District: Supaul district
- Deity: Vishnu

Location
- Location: Ganpatganj, Dharara Village, Raghopur
- State: Bihar
- Country: India
- Interactive map of Vishnu Temple
- Coordinates: 26.283890°N 86.828889°E

Architecture
- Type: Dravidian
- Creator: Pawan Kumar Mallik
- Completed: 2014
- Elevation: 62 m (203 ft)

Website
- varadrajaperumal.org

Vishnu Temple (Hindi: विष्णु मंदिर) is also known as Vishnudham Temple, Vishnupad Temple, and Sri Varadraja Perumal Devasthanam is a Hindu temple in Ganpatganj, Bihar, dedicated to lord Vishnu. This temple is located along National Highway 131 and spreads over an area of 15 acres (6.1 ha).

Dr. Pawan Kumar Mallik, founder of the Sri Varadraja Perumal Devasthanam Trust and a popular surgeon in Supaul district, laid the foundation stone of the Vishnu temple in 2004, and construction was completed in 2014.

== Architecture ==
The architectural style of the temple is Dravidian and is influenced by Varadharaja Perumal Temple, Kanchipuram.

== Location ==
It is located 35 kilometres (22 mi) south of district headquarter Supaul, and 260 kilometres (160 mi) southwest of state capital Patna. The temple is situated in Ganpatganj, which comes under Dharahara village of Raghopur block.

== Temple Trust ==
The temple is managed by Sri Varadraja Perumal Devasthanam Trust since its inception. The trust is composed of 8 members and registered under the Bihar Hindu Religious Trust Act, 1950.

== See also ==
- Religion in Bihar
