= Chaumukhi Mahadev =

Hindu temple in India

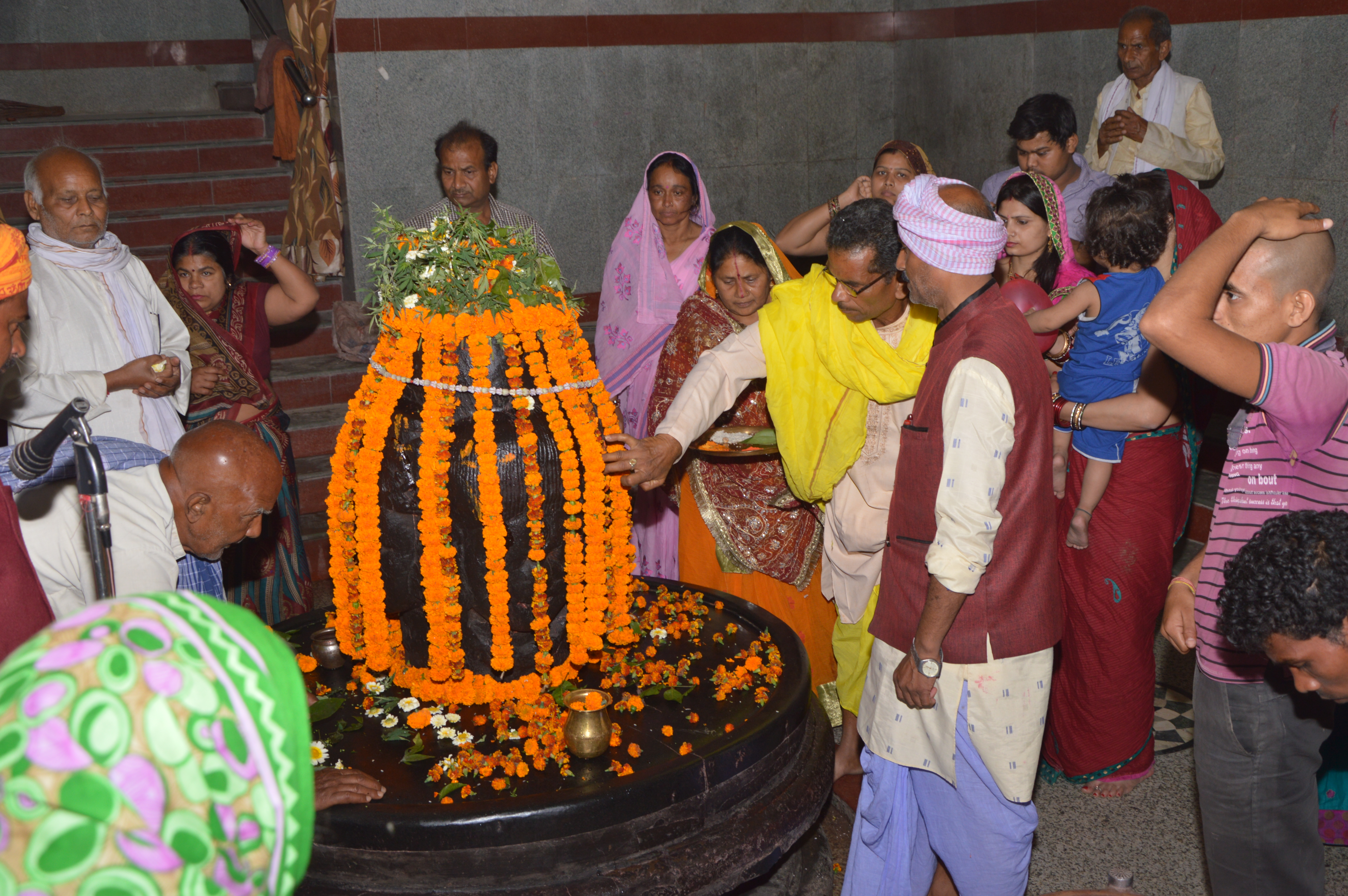
Chaturmukhi Mahadev

Chaumukhi Mahadev, or Chaturmukhi Mahadev, is a historic Hindu temple located approximately 2 kilometres (1.2 mi) east of Vaishali Gadh, Bihar, India. The temple has Shivling with four god faces, Brahma, Vishnu, Mahesh and Surya. While the construction time is unknown, it is believed to have been built during the fifth century.
