= Nair temple =

Hindu temple in India

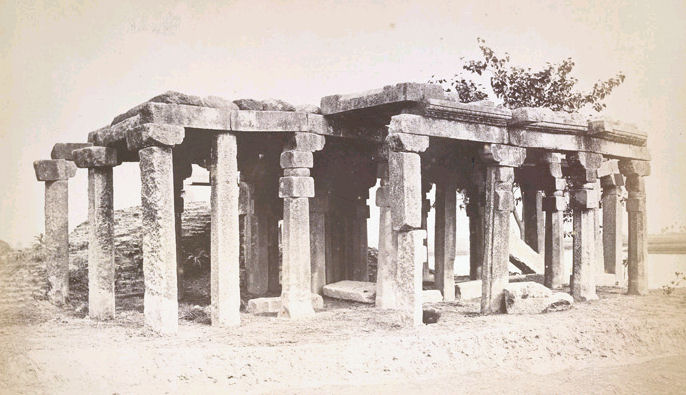
Pillared temple in Nair between Patna and Gaya, with pillar capital arrangement.

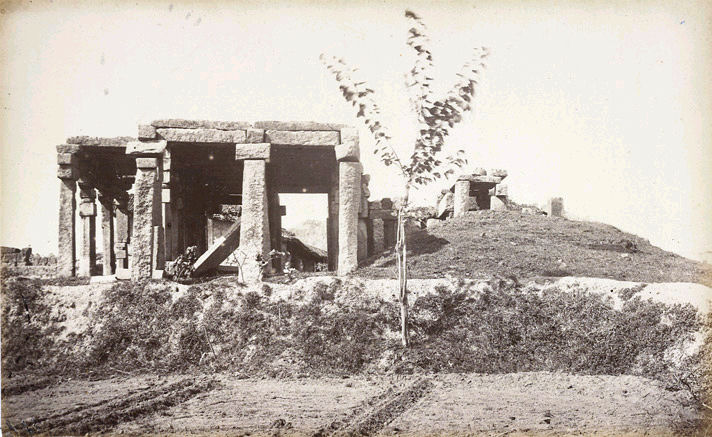
Side of the temple portico, with mound of the crumbled structure.

The Nair temple is a ruined pillared temple at the location of Nair, on the road between Patna and Gaya, west of Dharawat. It is about 20 miles from Gaya.

The temple consists of three rows of monolithic pillars, ten pillars in each row. In the front of the temple there is a further row of four pillars.

According to Thomas Fraser Peppé, who photographed it in 1870: "The temple behind consists of brick and mud cement, but very little of it is now standing; the superstructure is entirely gone, and none of the temples of this form are sufficiently complete to allow a conjecture as to their original form. The roof of the portico and the shrine is composed of large granite slabs, a linga now occupies the shrine, and there is a mutilated figure of Ganesh lying outside. Judging by the size of the mound, and the part of the shrine remaining, the temple must have been a lofty one...".

The pillars are made of granite in one block. They form a portico which is still standing in front of the temple.

This temple is said to be similar to the temple of Poonawa, 14 miles east of Gaya.
