= Mahavir Balaji Temple Karharia =

Hindu temple in Bihar, India

Shree Shree 1008 Siya Ram Bhakt Mahavir Balajee Temple
- Shri Shri 1008 Siya-Ram Bhakt Mahavir Balaji Mandir
- Location in Maldih Banka Bihar Mahavir Balaji Temple Karharia (India)

Religion
- Affiliation: Hinduism
- District: Karharia Khesar Banka
- Deity: Hanuman

Location
- Location: Maldih, Banka near by Pipra High School
- State: Bihar
- Country: India
- Interactive map of Shree Shree 1008 Siya Ram Bhakt Mahavir Balajee Temple
- Coordinates: 25.24°N 86.58°E

Website
- www.karharia.blogspot.in

Shri Shri 1008 Siya-Ram Bhakt Mahavir Balaji Mandir (Hindi/Banka: श्री श्री १००८ सिया राम भक्त महावीर बालाजी मंदिर करहरिया ) is a noted Hindu temple, otherwise known as a Mandir, in the Banka district of Bihar. It is dedicated to the Hindu God Hanuman. The name Shri Shri 1008 Sitaram Bhakt Mahavir Balaji is applied to Shri Hanuman in several areas of India, because the childhood form of the Lord (Bala in Hindi or Sanskrit) is especially celebrated there.

The temple is dedicated to Shri Shri 1008 Sitaram bhakt Mahavir Balaji (another name for Shree Hanuman Jee). Unlike similar religious sites, it is located in a village rather than the countryside. Its reputation for ritualistic healing and exorcism of evil spirits attracts many pilgrims from Banka, Bhagalpur and Munger districts and elsewhere. The old village, Karharia, is located near the west side of the small hill of Fullidumar, which is about 8 km away. It is located approximately 500 meters east of the mini block of Maldih Panchayat of Shambhunj main block. Local people worship this Hindu deity every day, and address this village square by the name of Bajrangali Chowk Karharia.

== Personnel ==
The temple is well-known, especially in the southern parts of Bihar. The temple's first mahant was Shri Ganesh Puri ji Maharaj. The present mahant is Shri Naresh Puri ji Maharaj strictly follows a vegetarian diet and reads holy books. His small business sells tea and betel.

== Aid ==
A person suffering from evil spirits (sankatwala) can receive relief through in various ways including Ghee Light (Ghee Ka Diya), Orange Color Vermilion (sindoor), Rice, Urad, darkhast, Pulse, donating and bhog of bundi ke laddu offering to Shri. Tuesdays and Saturdays are the days of Hanumanji.

The temple performs exorcisms from evil spirits.

== Geography ==
The temple is situated in Karharia, Karauli district near Most Powerful Goddess Shri Durga Mata. The village is situated at the middle of two district blocks- Shambhuganj and Fullidumar. It is 31.2 km from Sultanganj, Bhagalpur, 35.5 km from Banka railway station and 23.2 km from Tarapur, Munger.

Nearby temples include Shree Shitla Mata, Shree Kali Mata, Shre Durga Mata, Shri Jakhraj Baba Palace Shri and Narsingh Baba Palace.

== See also ==
- Salasar Balaji
