= Sundernath =

Hindu temple in Bihar, India

Sundarnath
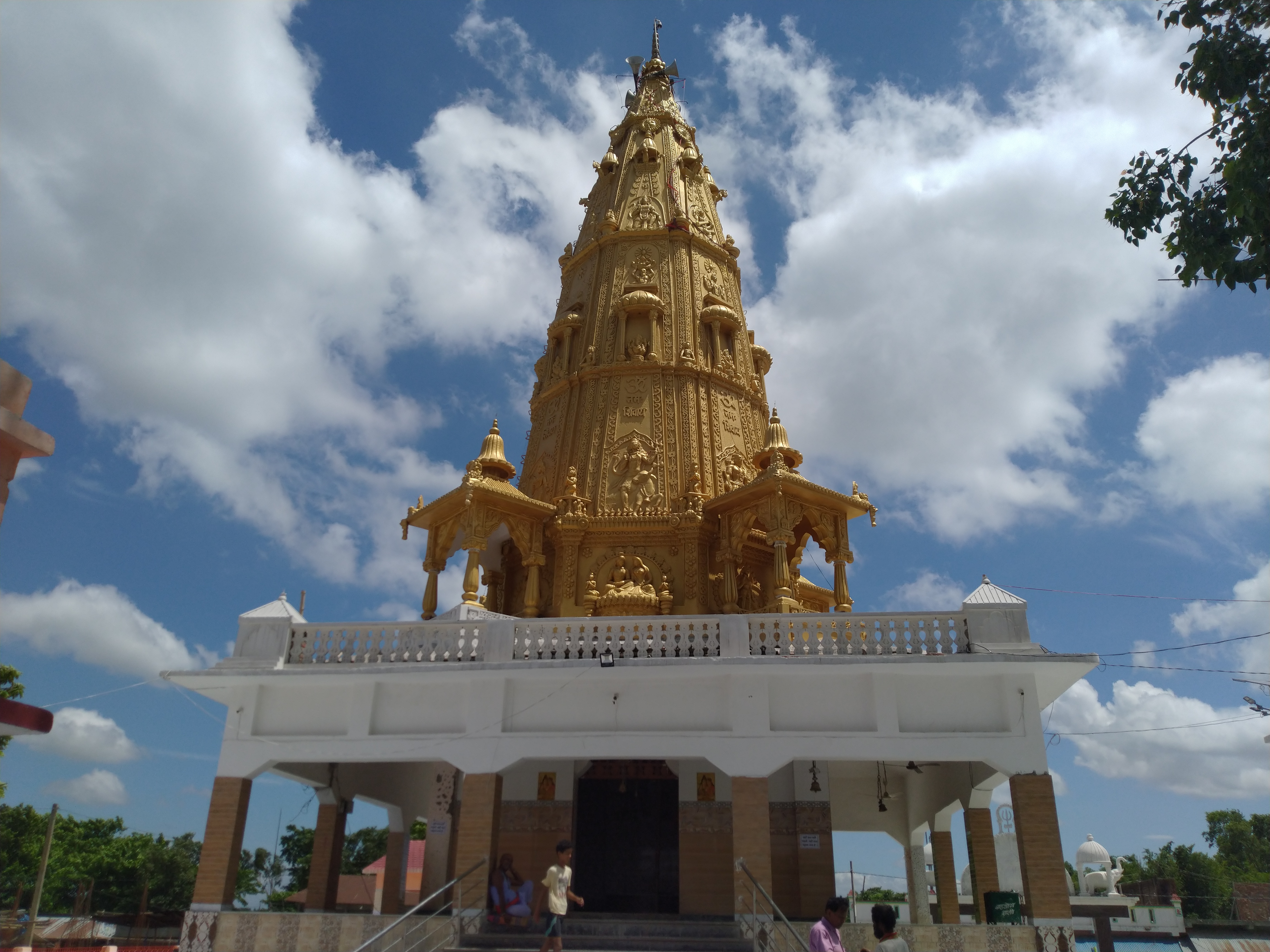
- Sundernath temple

- Location within Bihar

Religion
- Affiliation: Hinduism
- District: Araria
- Deity: Shiva (Sundernath)
- Festivals: Maha Shivaratri, Purnima
- Governing body: Baba Sundernath Mandir Samiti

Location
- Location: Kursakanta
- State: Bihar
- Country: India
- Coordinates: 26.3810182°N 87.3934761°E

Architecture
- Type: Hindu temple architecture#Nagara

Sundarnath is a temple in Kursakanta Araria of the Indian state of Bihar near the India–Nepal border, at Sundari Math (Sundarnath Dham) where Hindus from South Nepal and North Bihar worship the Hindu god Shiva. It is a major historical temple to Shiva in the Mithila region of Bihar.
