= Mitheshwarnath Shiva Temple =

Hindu temple in India

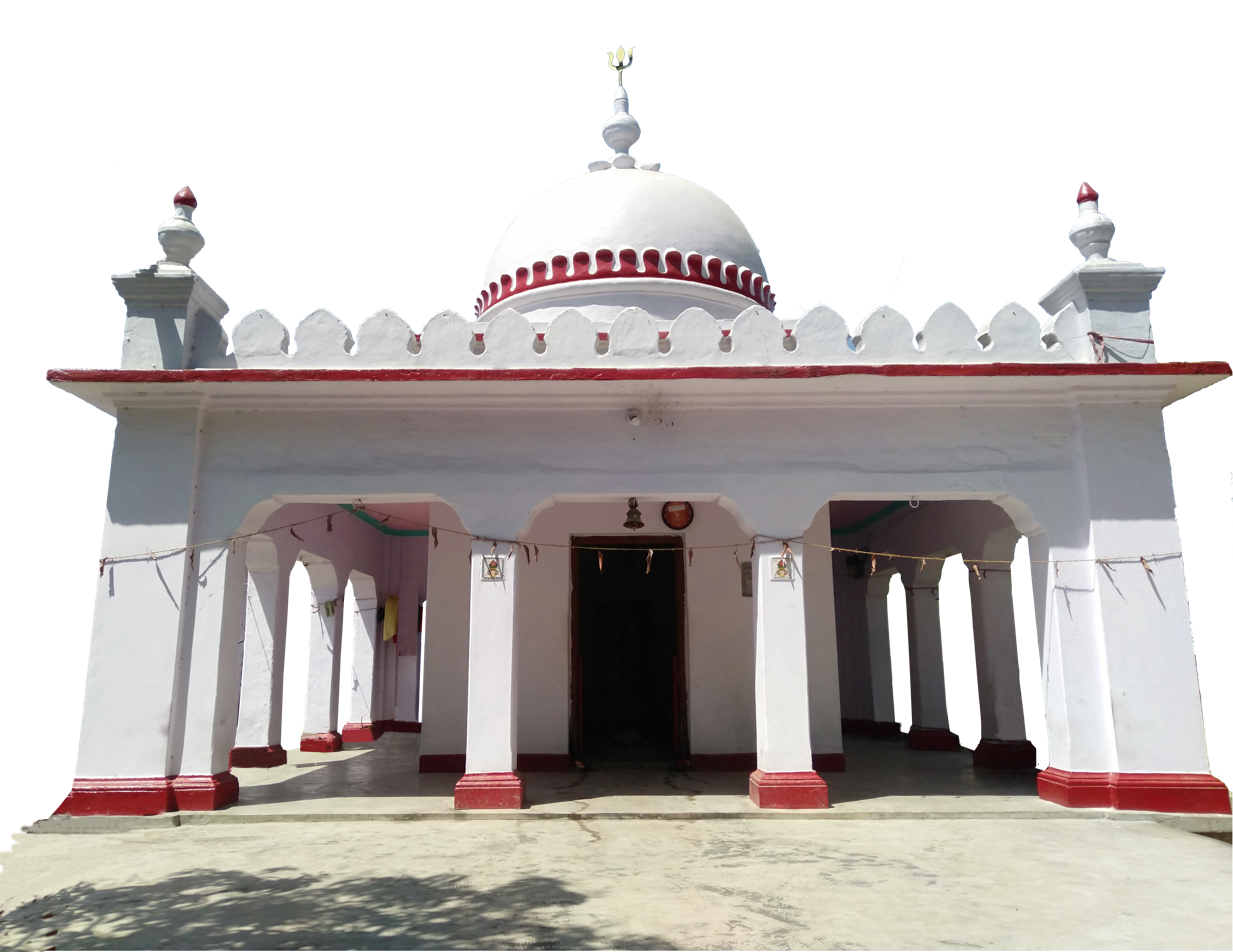
- View of Mittheswarnath Shiv Temple, established and built by Mitthu Mistri Thakur in March 1949.

- Location within Bihar Location within India Location within Asia

Religion
- Affiliation: Hinduism
- District: Darbhanga
- Deity: Shiva
- Festivals: Mahashivratri & Shraavana

Location
- Location: Chunabhatti, Darbhanga
- State: Bihar
- Country: India
- Interactive map of Mitheshwarnath Shiva Temple
- Coordinates: 26°10′10.8″N 85°54′32.6″E

Architecture
- Type: Hindu Temple
- Style: Mandapa
- Creator: Mitthu Mistri Thakur
- Established: March 1949
- Elevation: 54 m (177 ft)

Mitheshwarnath Shiva Temple (Hindi/Devanagari: मीठेश्वरनाथ शिव मंदिर) is a Hindu Temple, dedicated to the Hindu god "Shiva". This temple is located at Chunabhatti, near Mitthu Mistri Chowk, Darbhanga District, Bihar, India. This temple was built in the 20th century, as compared to Cornerstone of the Temple, and established by "Mitthu Mistri Thakur" in March 1949. The name of the temple is originally denoted by "Mitthu Mistri Thakur." After the death of Mitthu Mistri Thakur on 21 October 1982, this temple was maintained by Mitthu Mistri Thakur's sons (viz., Motilal Thakur, Misrilal Thakur, Sonelal Thakur, Shobhalal Thakur, and Bipinlal Thakur). Now, this temple is maintained and cared for by the "Mitthu Mistri Thakur" Dynasty. Temples have on average a small number of visitors, usually local people, per day, But during festivals like Maha Shivaratri, Shraavana, Naga Panchami, Kartik Purnima, the number of visitors to the workplace and those who come to worship and pray to God Shiva are more.

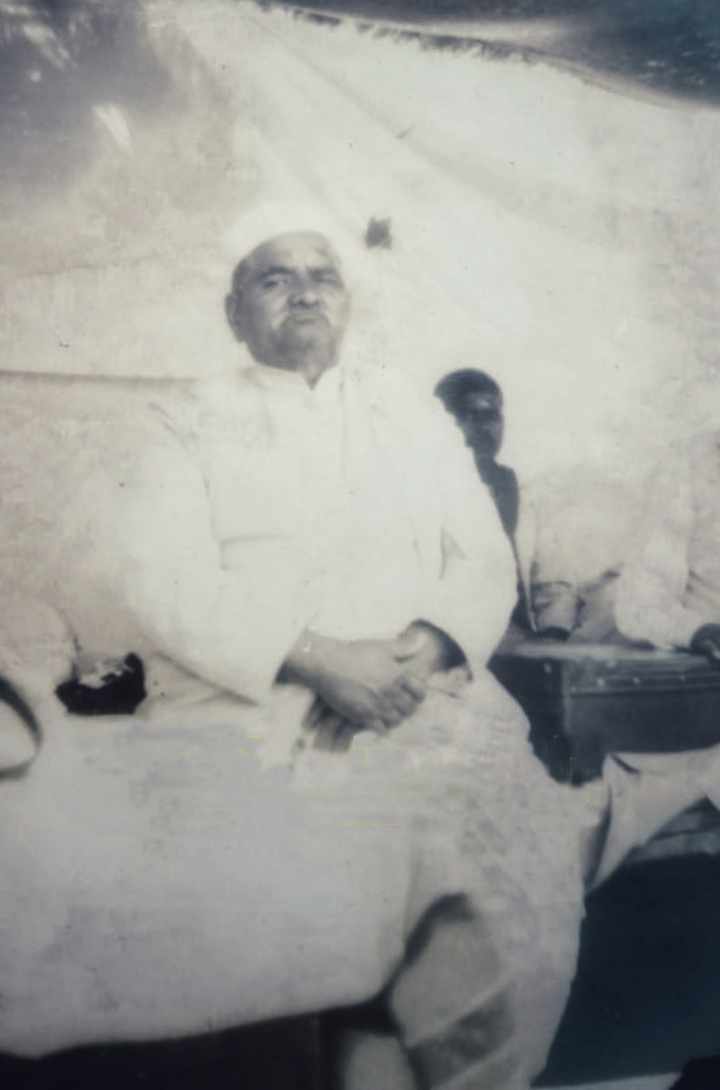
Photograph of Mitthu Mistri Thakur

== History and legend ==
This temple is about 71 years old if it is done from the established date. According to the foundation stone of this temple, the temple is built and established by "Mitthu Mistri Thakur." A legend story is hidden within this temple. According to the legend story told by "Mitthu Mistri Thakur's" grandson, "J. M. Thakur," one day a sage came to Mitthu Thakur's house. Mitthu Thakur asked the sage, "What do you want, Baba?" The Rishi said, "I am very hungry; give me something to eat." Mitthu Thakur said, "Okay, you sit here, and I'll bring you something to eat." Mitthu Thakur came to the house to arrange food for that Rishi, then it was mango season at that time, so Mitthu Thakur brought "curd," "flattened rice," and "mango" for that Rishi on a plate.

When Mitthu Thakur came to get food, the Rishi said to Mitthu Thakur, "Look, you offer water to that "Black Stone" every day, you do one thing, build a Shiva temple at the corner there". Mitthu Thakur said, "Okay! Okay! You should have food first" and started coming to the courtyard. When Mitthu Thakur started coming to the courtyard, he looked back, and the Rishi was not after him. Mitthu Thakur felt maybe the Rishi would be out. When he went to look outside, the Rishi was not even outside. Mitthu Thakur started thinking, what should be done with this food? Mitthu Thakur thought that he would be Lord Shiva and buried the food with a plate below the ground where the Rishi had said to build the temple. For this reason, Mitthu Mistri Thakur built this Shiva temple and named this temple "Mitheshwarnath Shiv Temple."

== Architecture ==
The architecture style of this temple is Mandapa compared to the Hindu temple structure. The architecture of this temple was built by a British architect. The area calculation of the temple is 0.03 acres OR 7.17 dhur as per "Google Earth." The height of this temple is about 25–30 feet. The temple has 12 pillars, and the courtyard of the temple was renovated in 2016 by the Mitthu Thakur dynasty. Inside the temple are the "Shivling," "Nandi Statue," and "Ganesha idols with his Mother Parvati." There is a "Tulsi Square" outside the temple.

There are also two tombs opposite the Mitheshwarnath Shiva Temple; one, which is tall in height, is the "Mitthu Mistri Thakur Tomb," and the second, which is small in height, is the "Gangeswari Devi Tomb" (wife of Mitthu Mistri Thakur). The Gangeswari Devi Tomb was built first, and then on 21 October 1982, after the death of Mitthu Mistri Thakur, the "Mitthu Mistri Thakur Tomb" was built and established by his sons. Now, the "Mitthu Mistri Thakur" dynasty comes here every day to pray and worship at this tomb. The compound wall of this tomb was rebuilt in 2018 by the "Mitthu Mistri Thakur" dynasty.

== Gallery ==
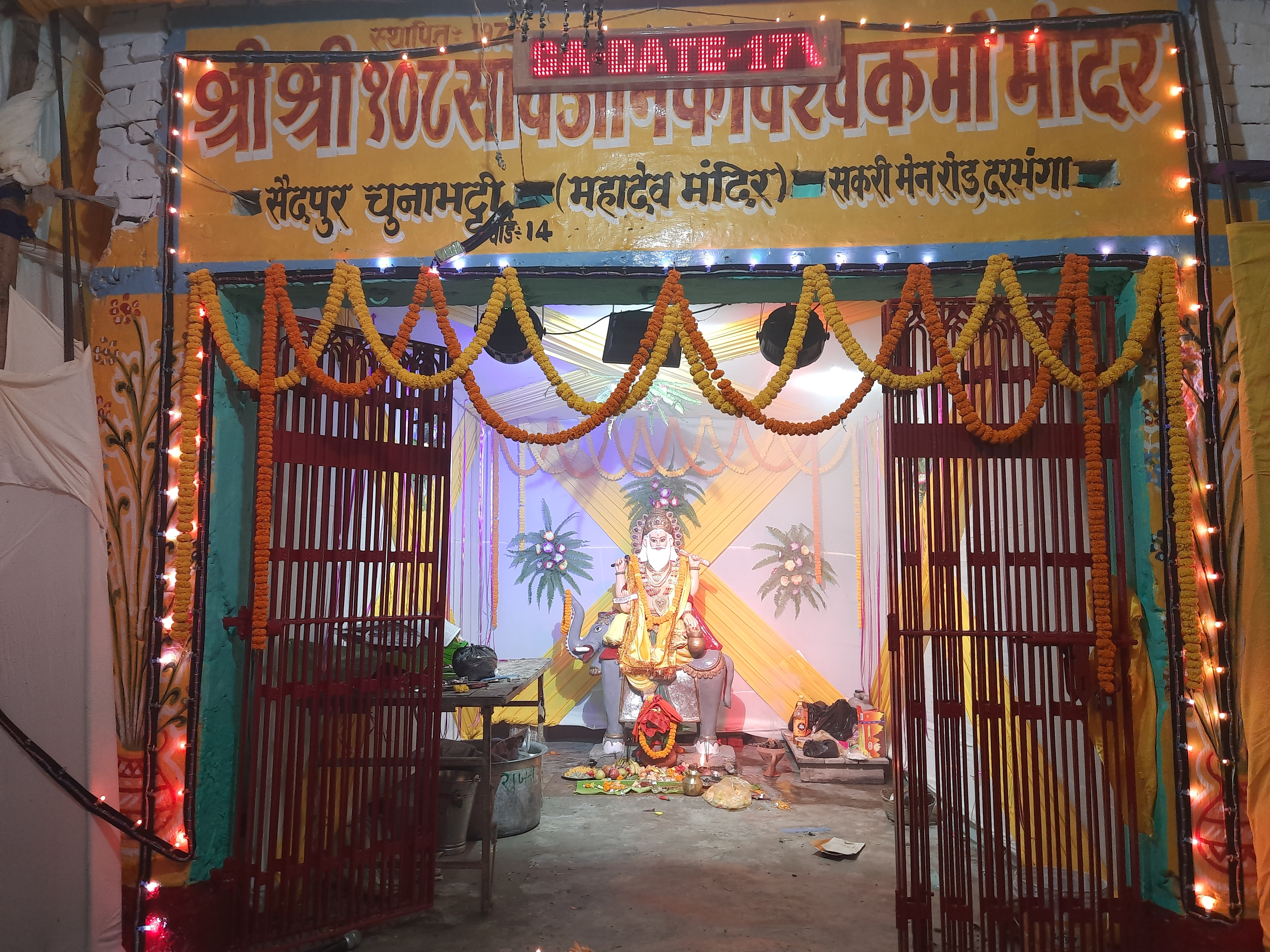
View of Vishwakarma Temple near Mitthu Shiv Mandir, Darbhanga District

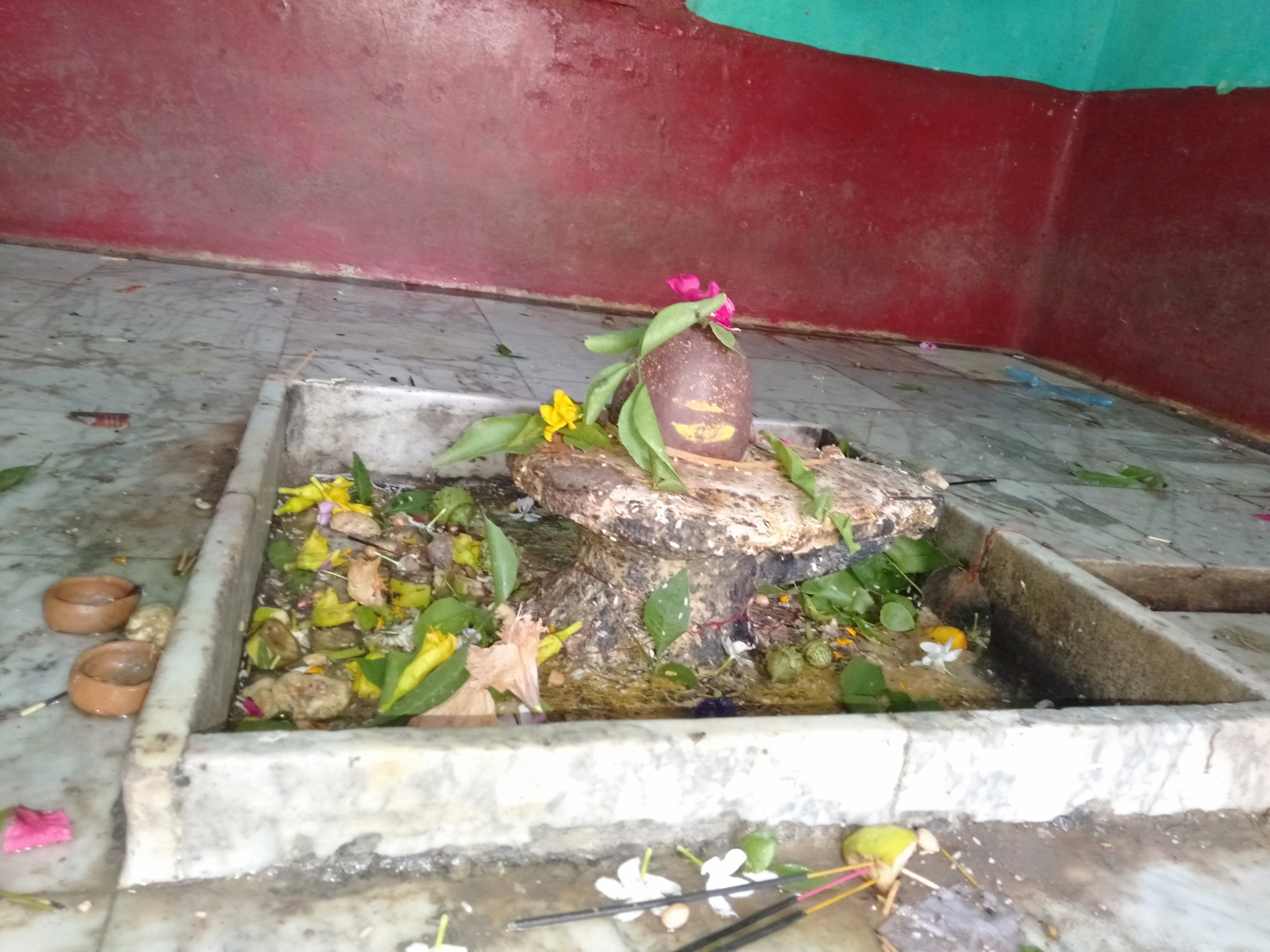
View of Shivling @ 27-07-2020 (Shravan Mas - 4 Day)

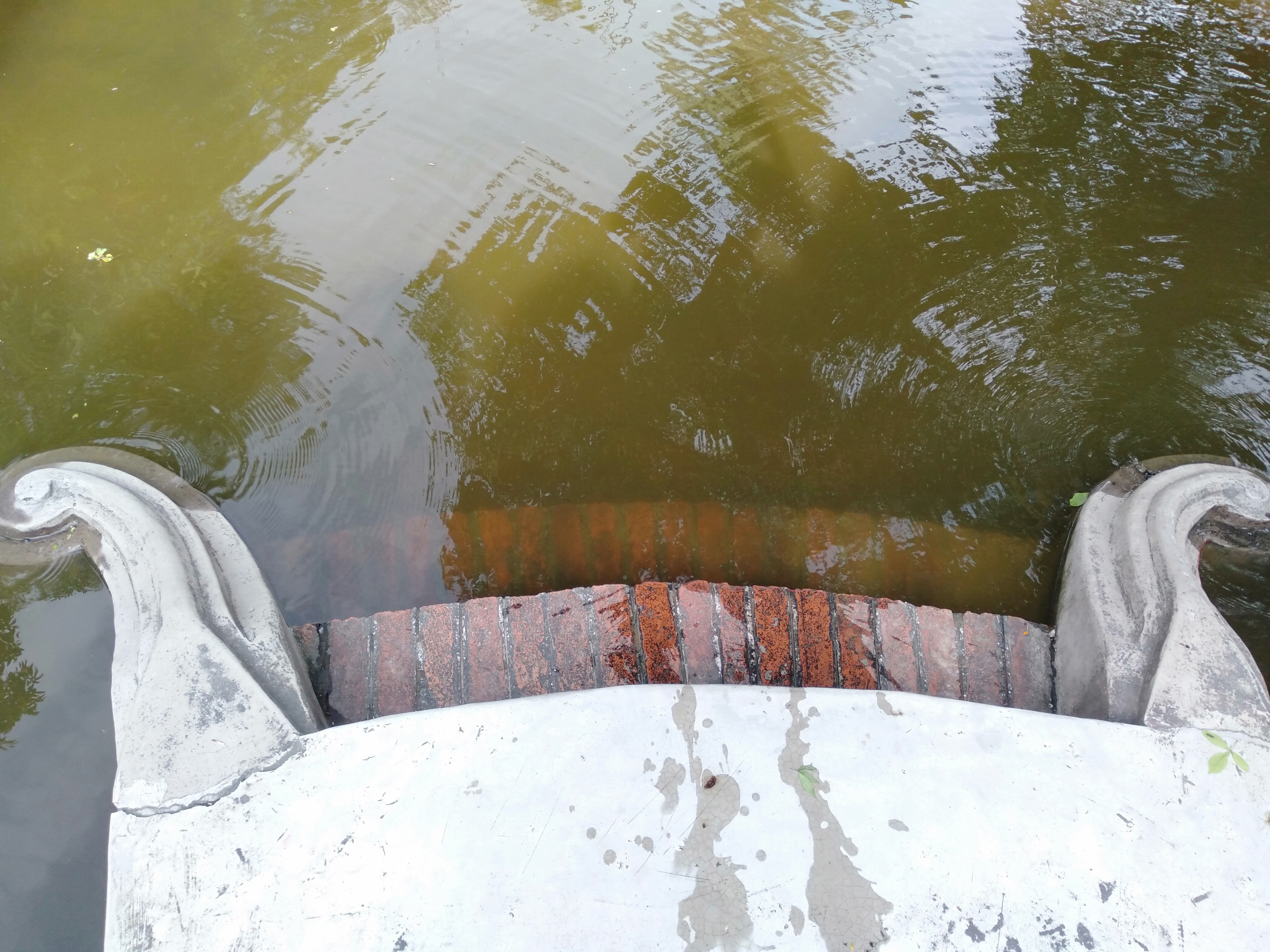
Drowned View of Mitheswarnath Shiv Temple Stair @ 27-07-2020.

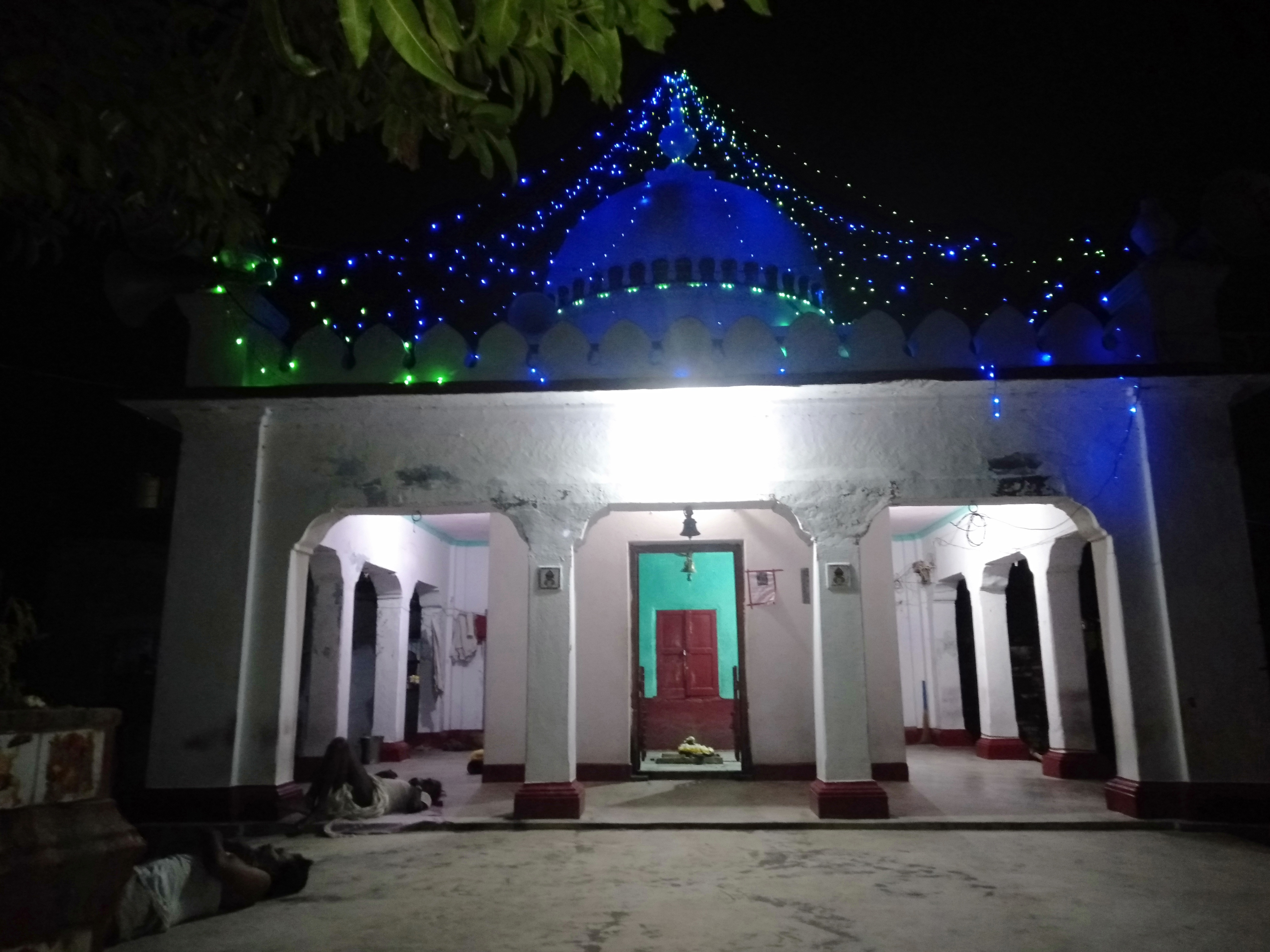
View of Mitheswarnath Shiv Temple at night during "Shravan Mas" (1 Day). @ 06-07-2020

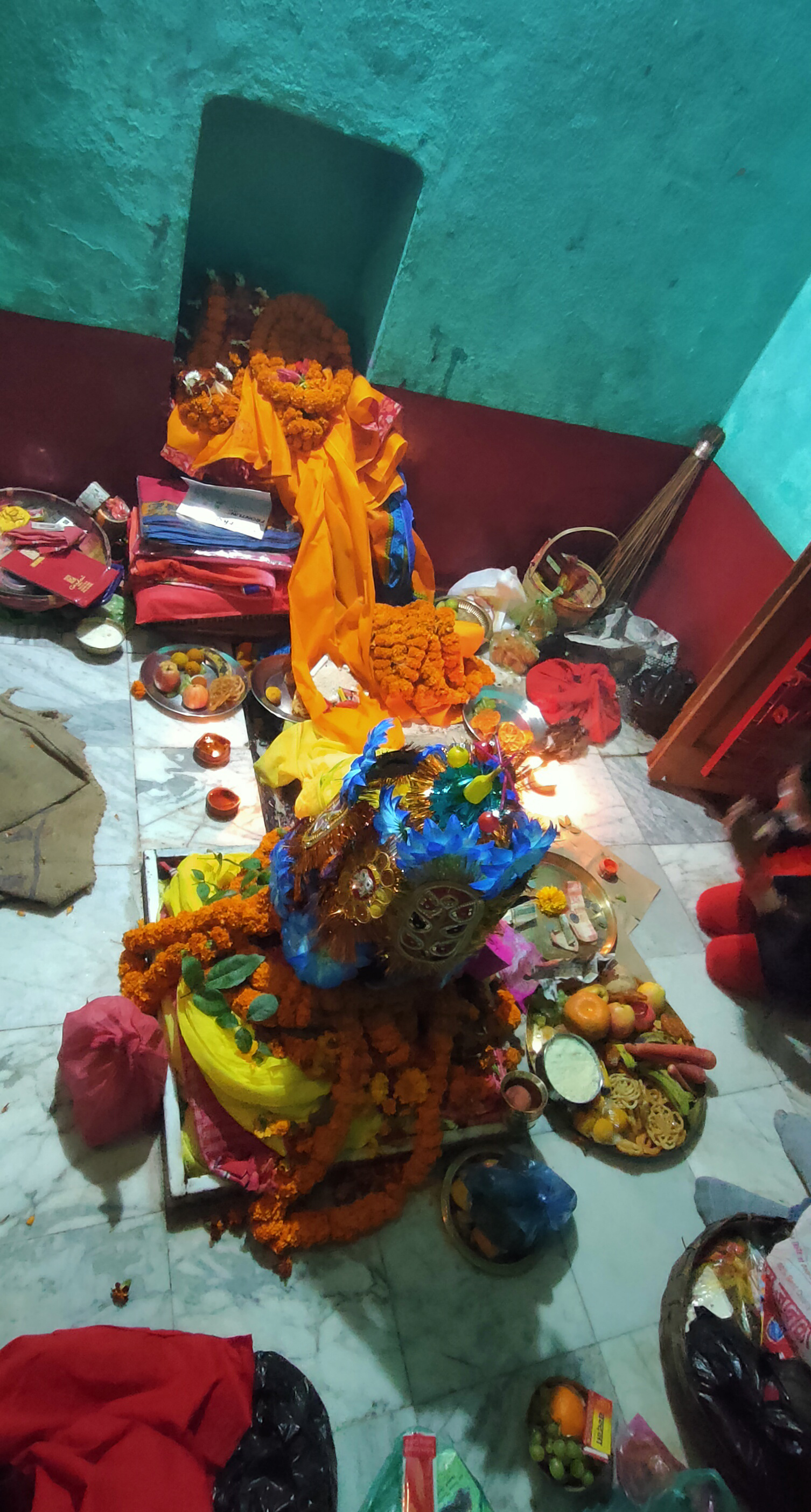
Shivling of Mitheswarnath Shiv Temple, click on Mahashivratri on 21 February 2020.

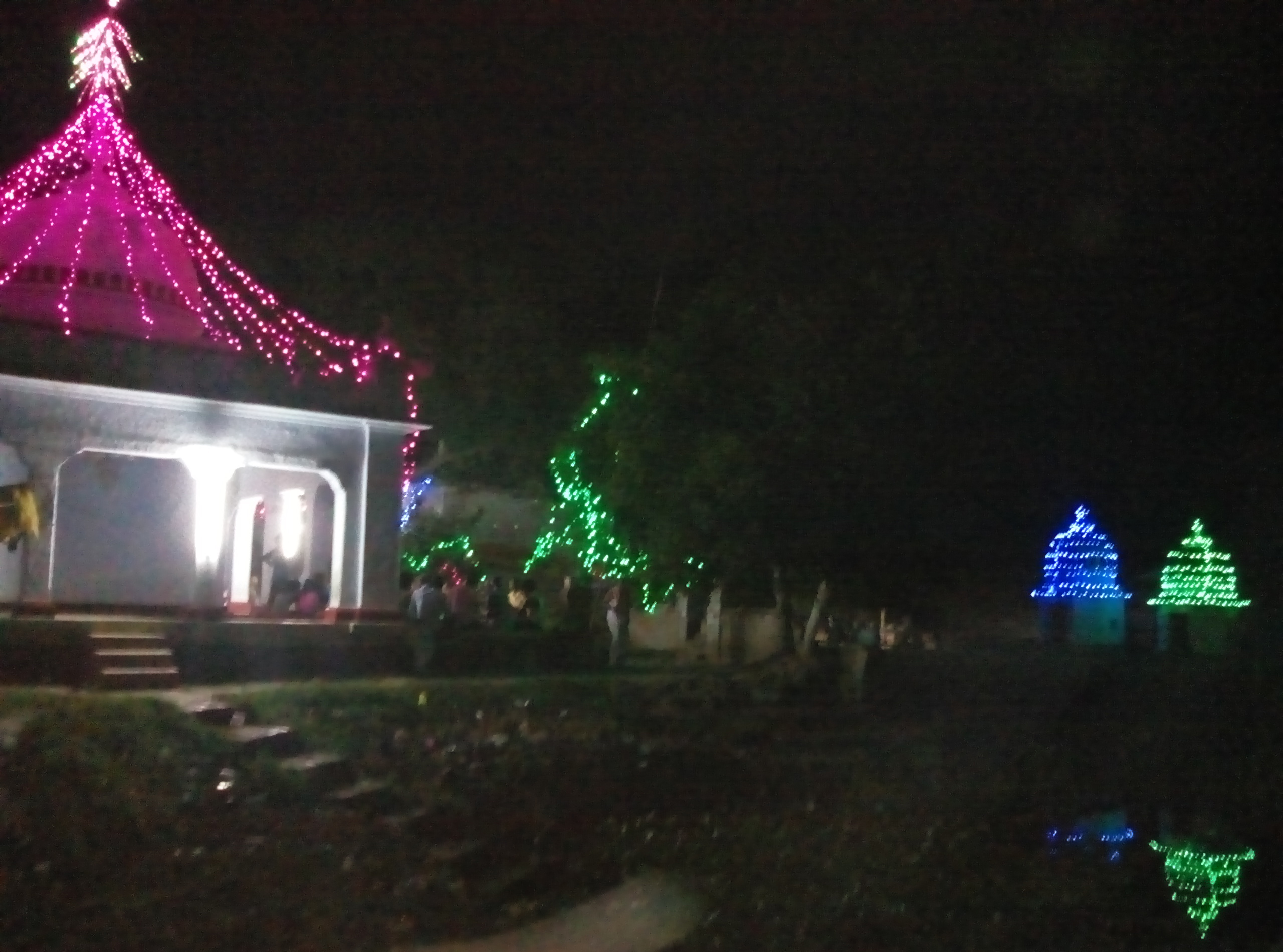
Lighting view of Mitheshwarnath Shiva Temple during Maha Shivratri Festival in March 2016.

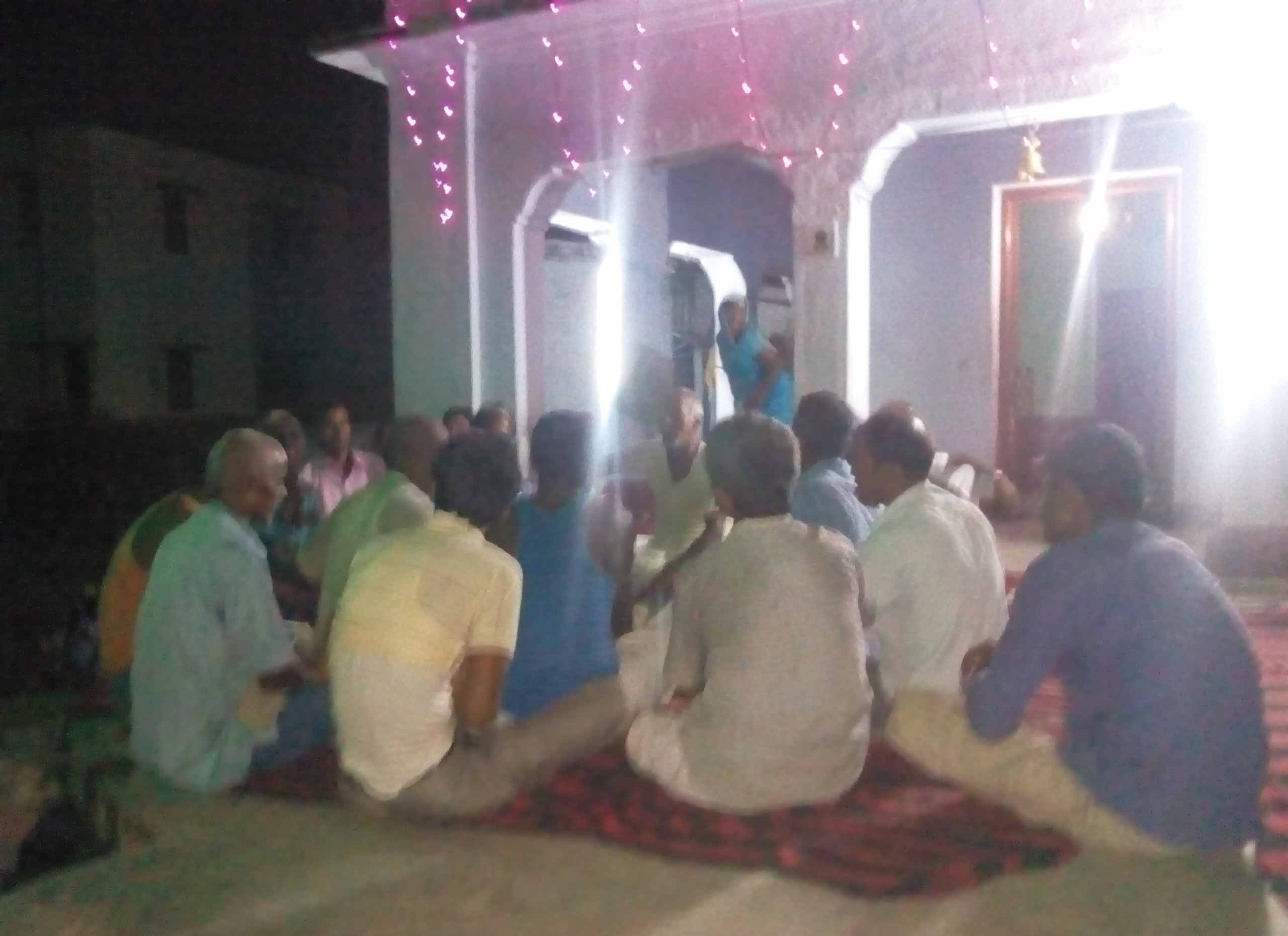
Bhajan during Maha Shivratri Festivals in Mitheswarnath Shiv Temple at 2016.

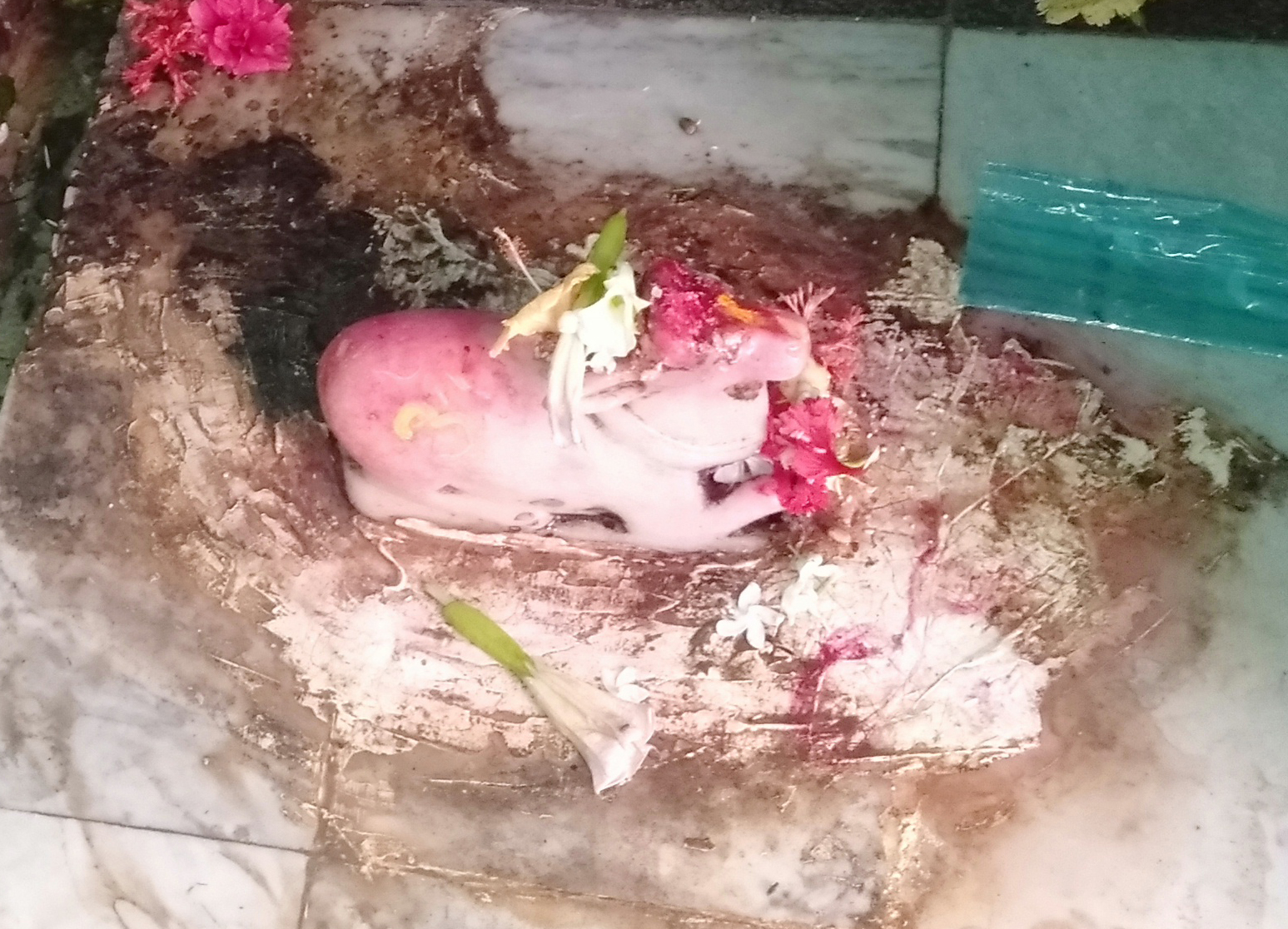
Nandi Statue inside Mitheswarnath Shiv Temple.

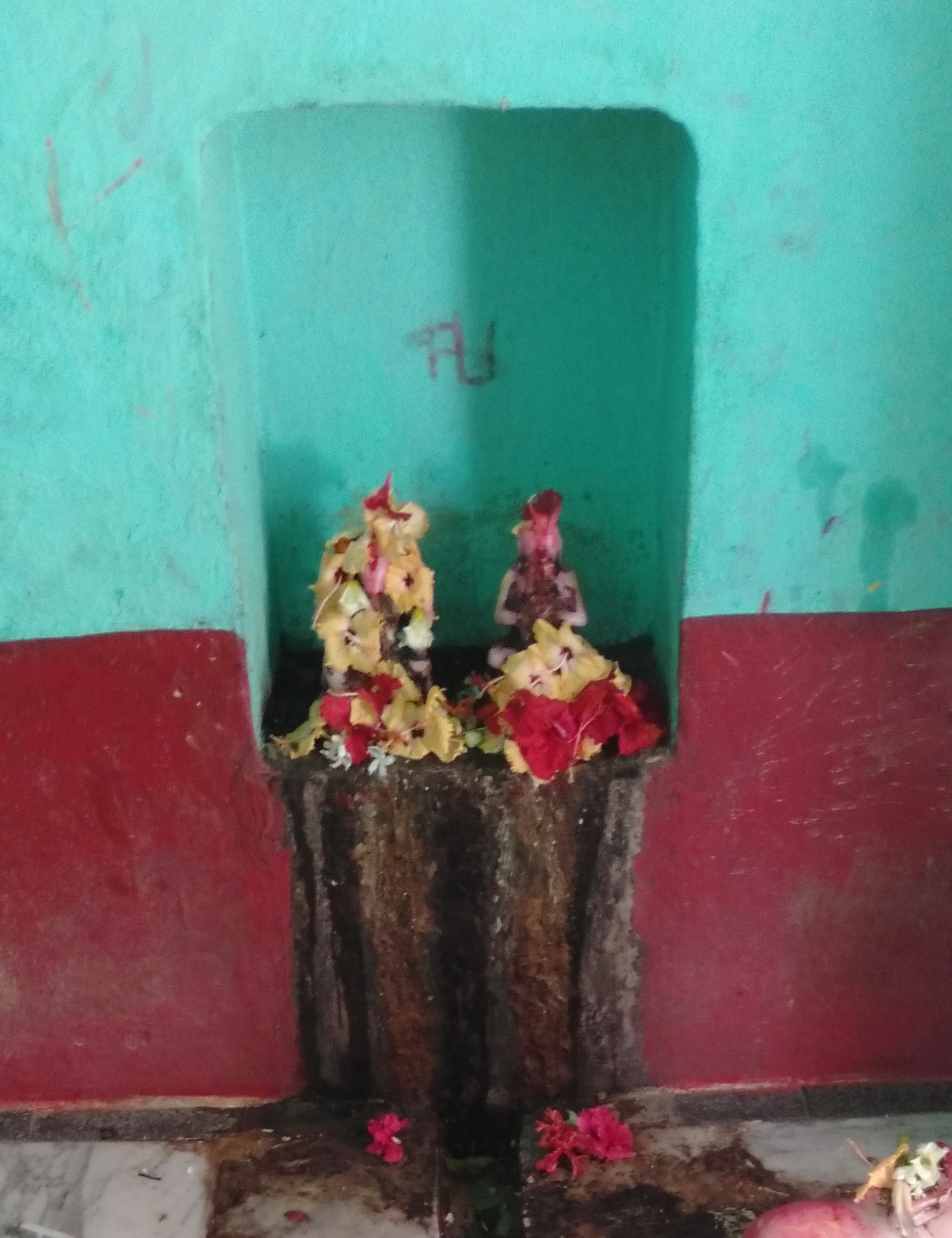
Ganesha and Parvati Idols (Murtis) inside Mitheswarnath Shiv Temple.

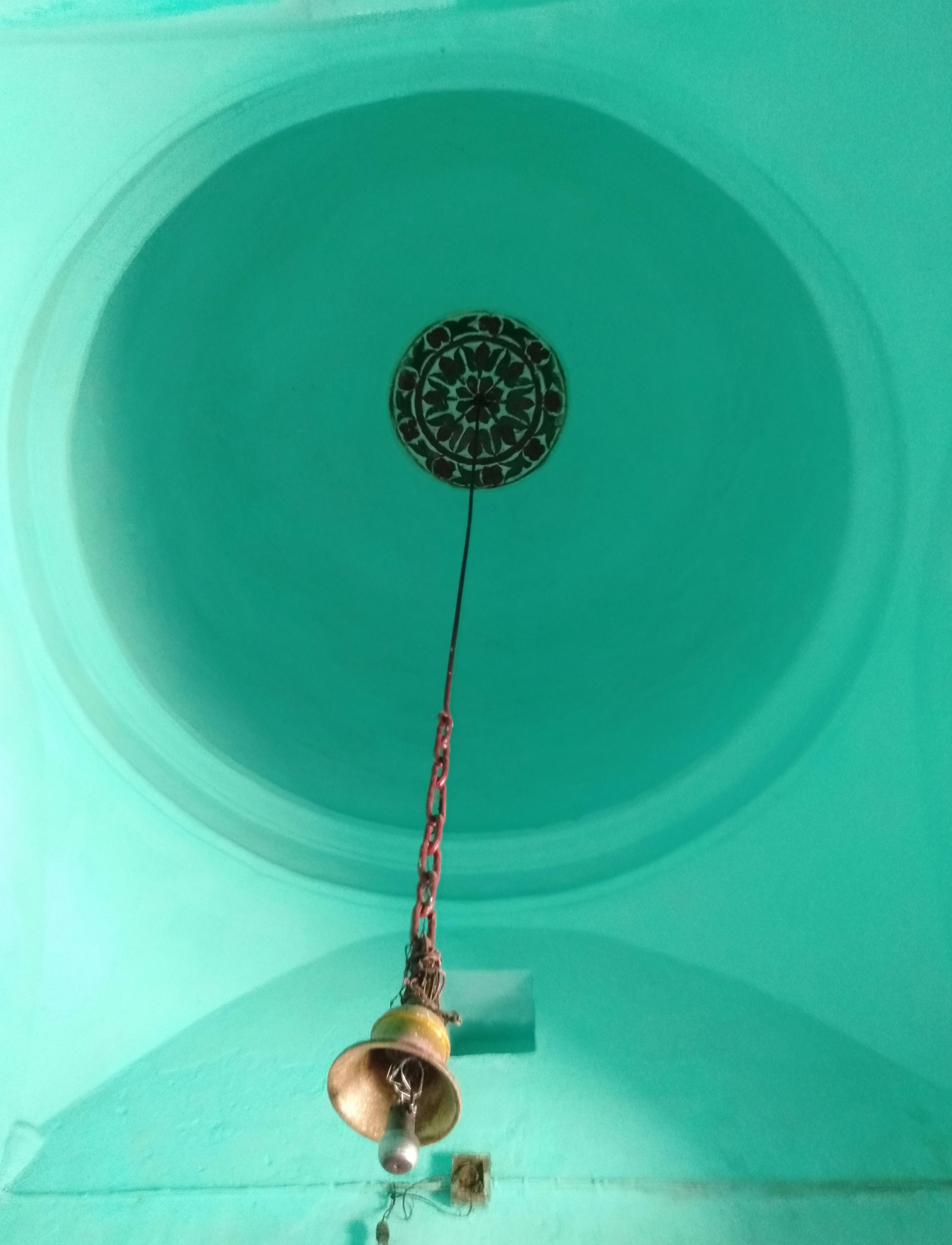
Interior view of Mitheswarnath Shiv Temple Dome.

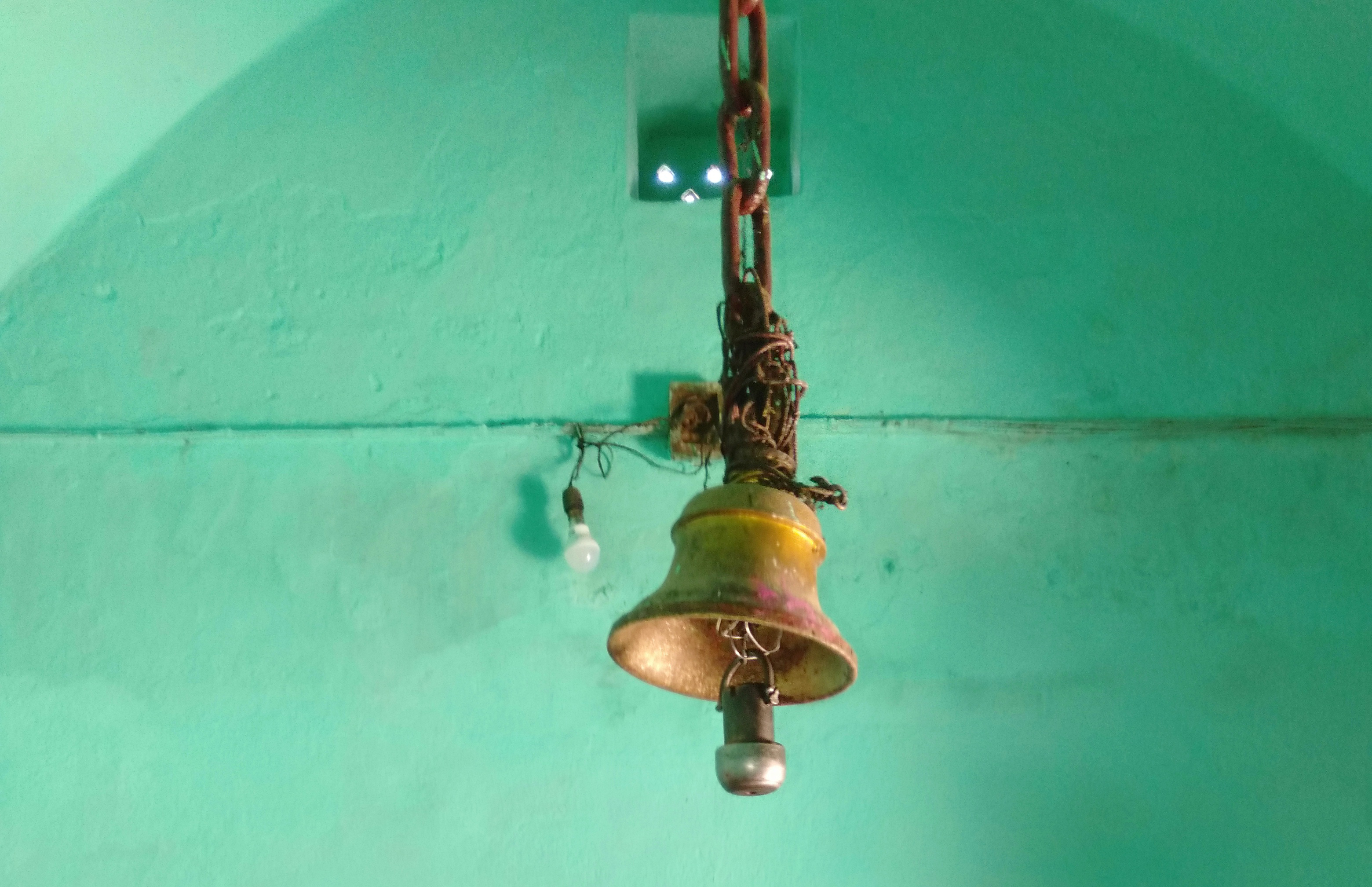
Brass Bell inside Mitheswarnath Shiv Temple.

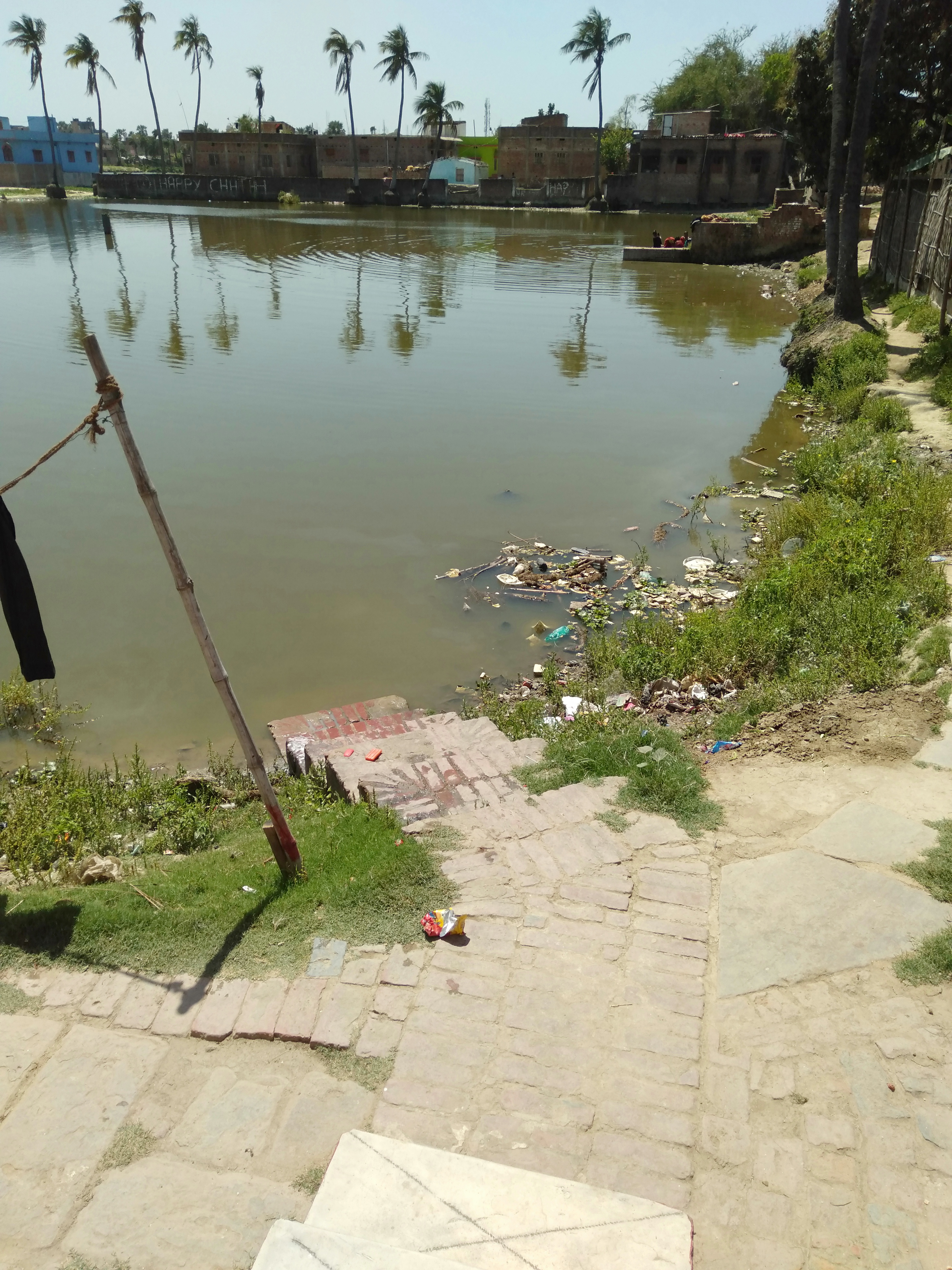
Mitheswarnath Shiv Temple Ghats.

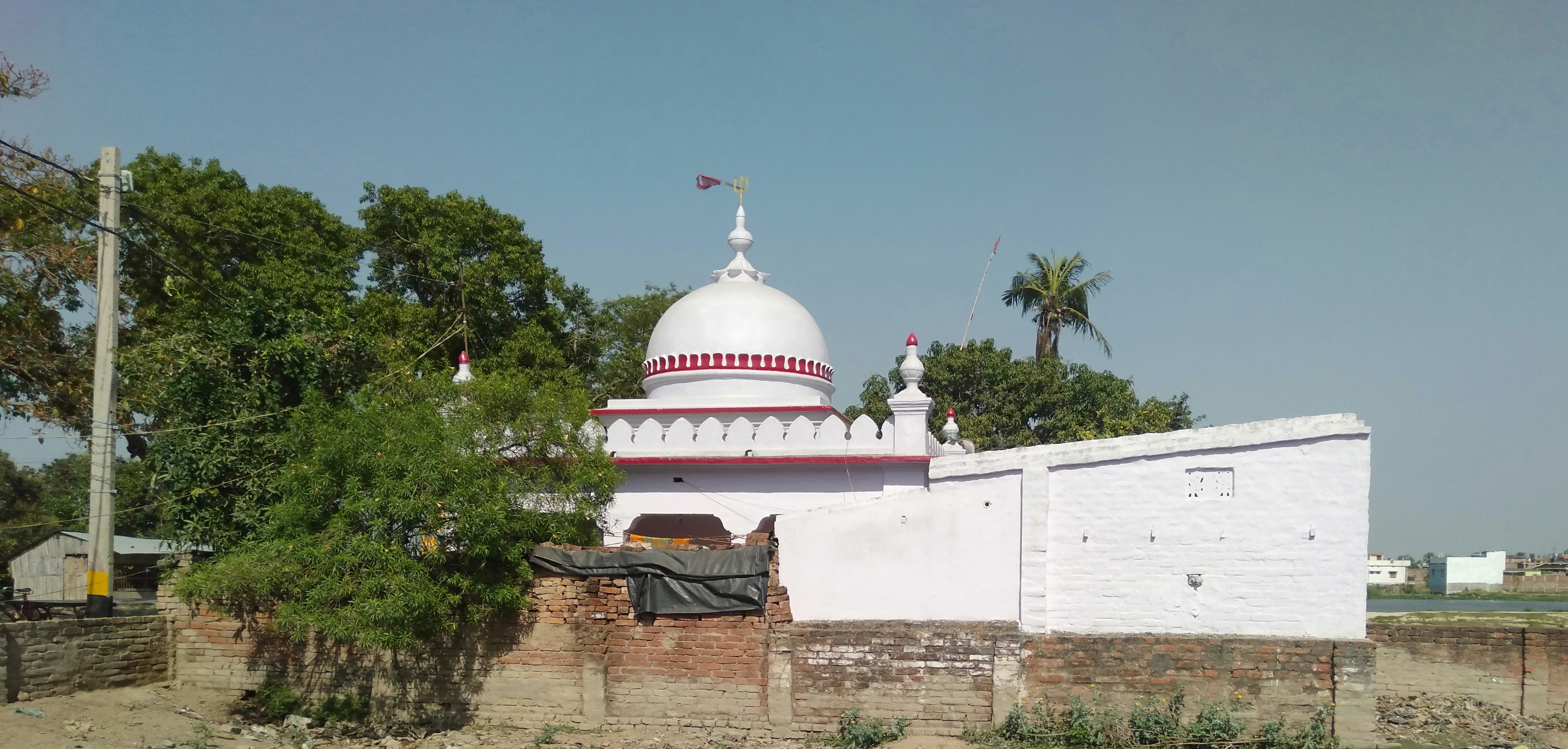
Back-Side View of Mitheswarnath Shiv Temple at Cunabhatti.

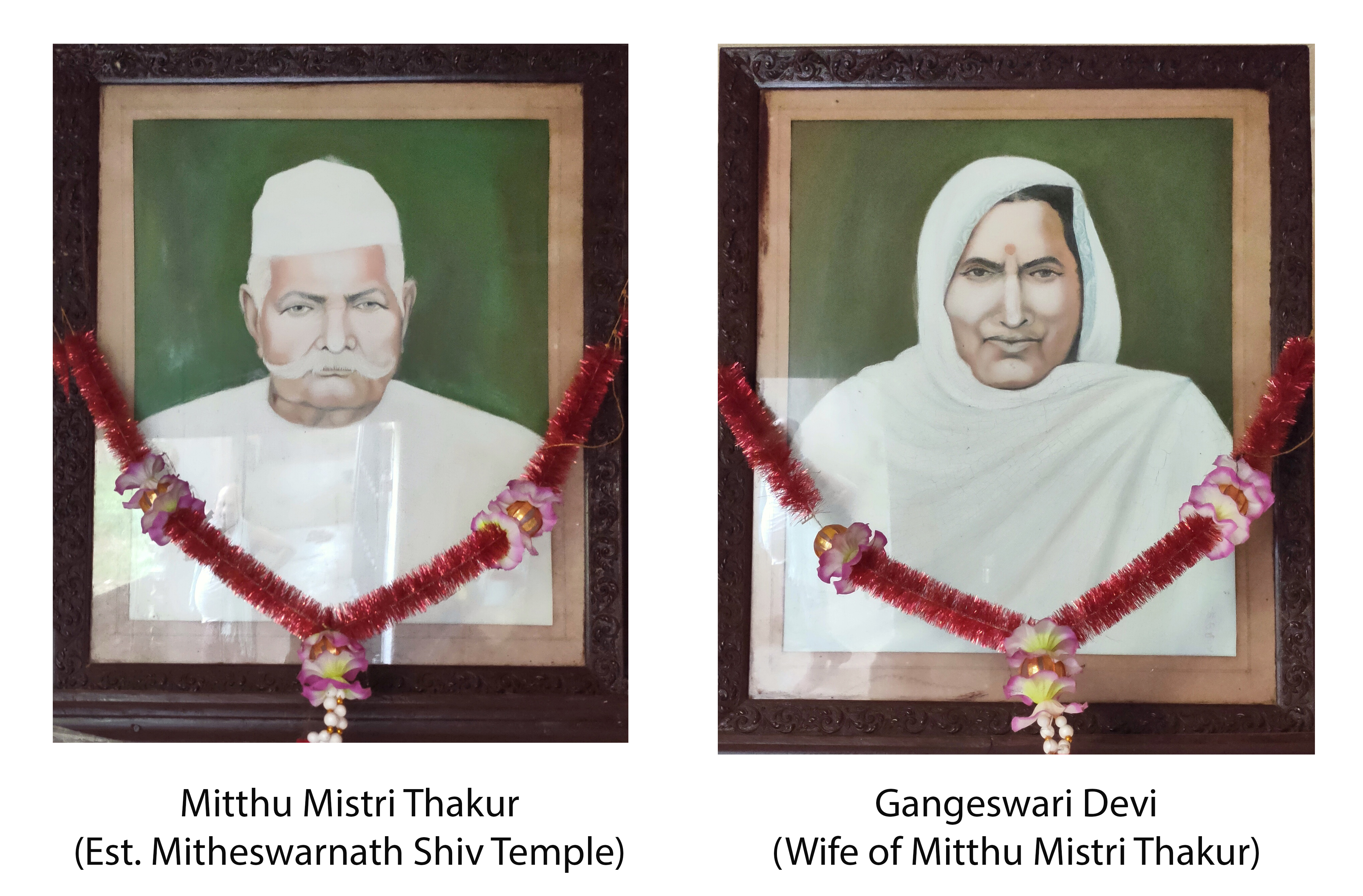
Frames of Mitthu Mistri Thakur with his wife Gangeswari Devi.

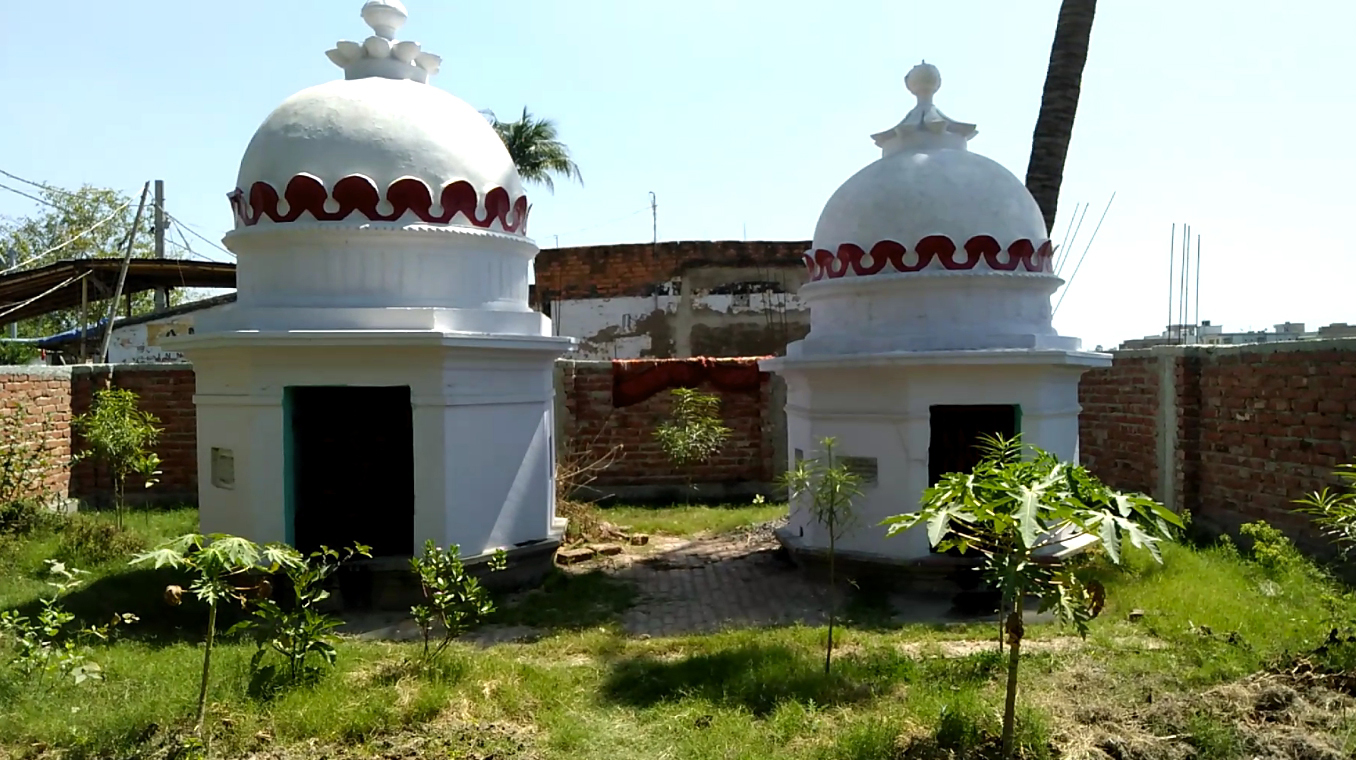
Tomb of Mitthu Thakur with his Wife Gangeswari Devi.

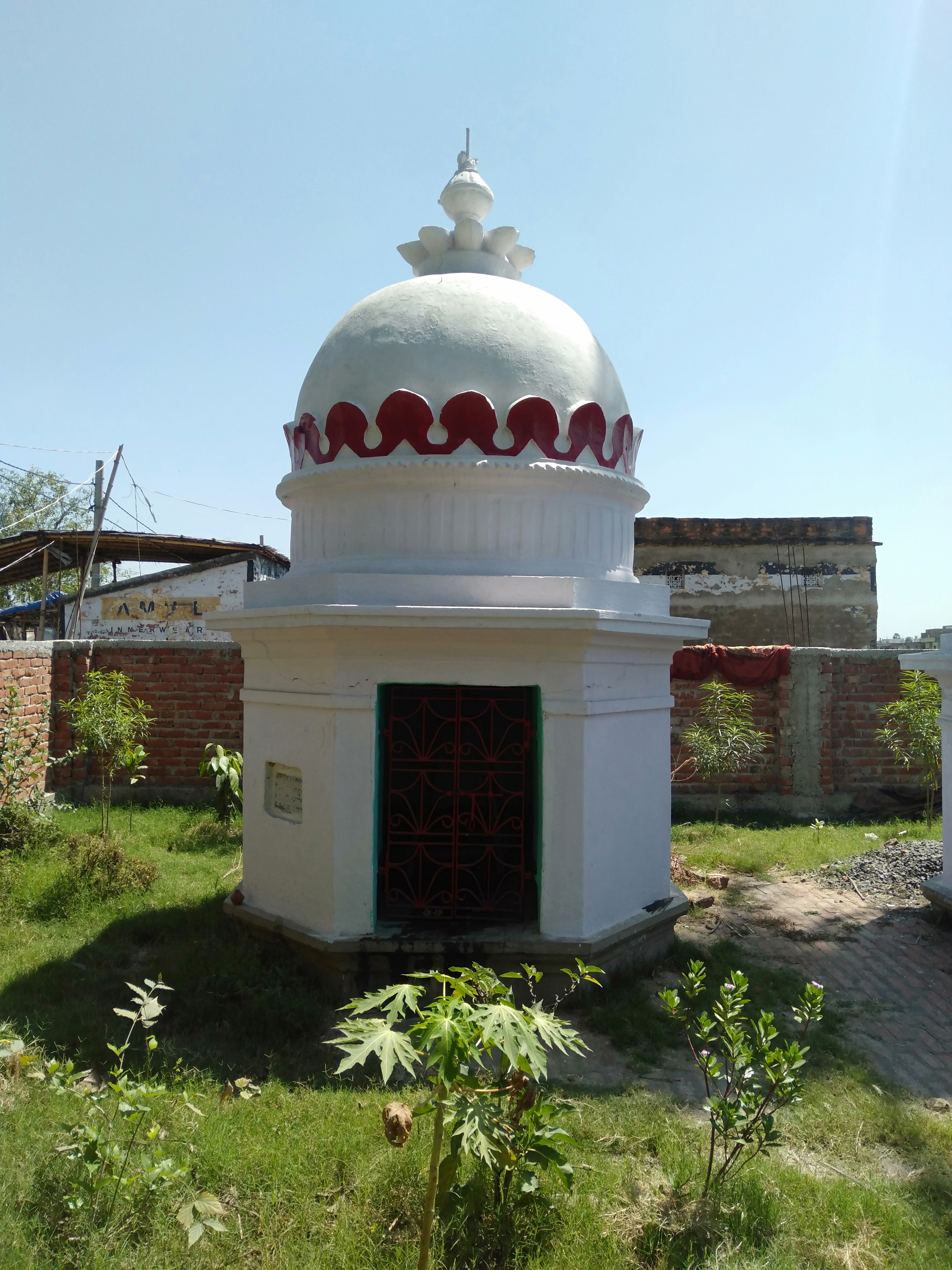
View of Mitthu Mistri Thakur Tomb located at Chunabatti, Darbhanga District, Bihar, India.

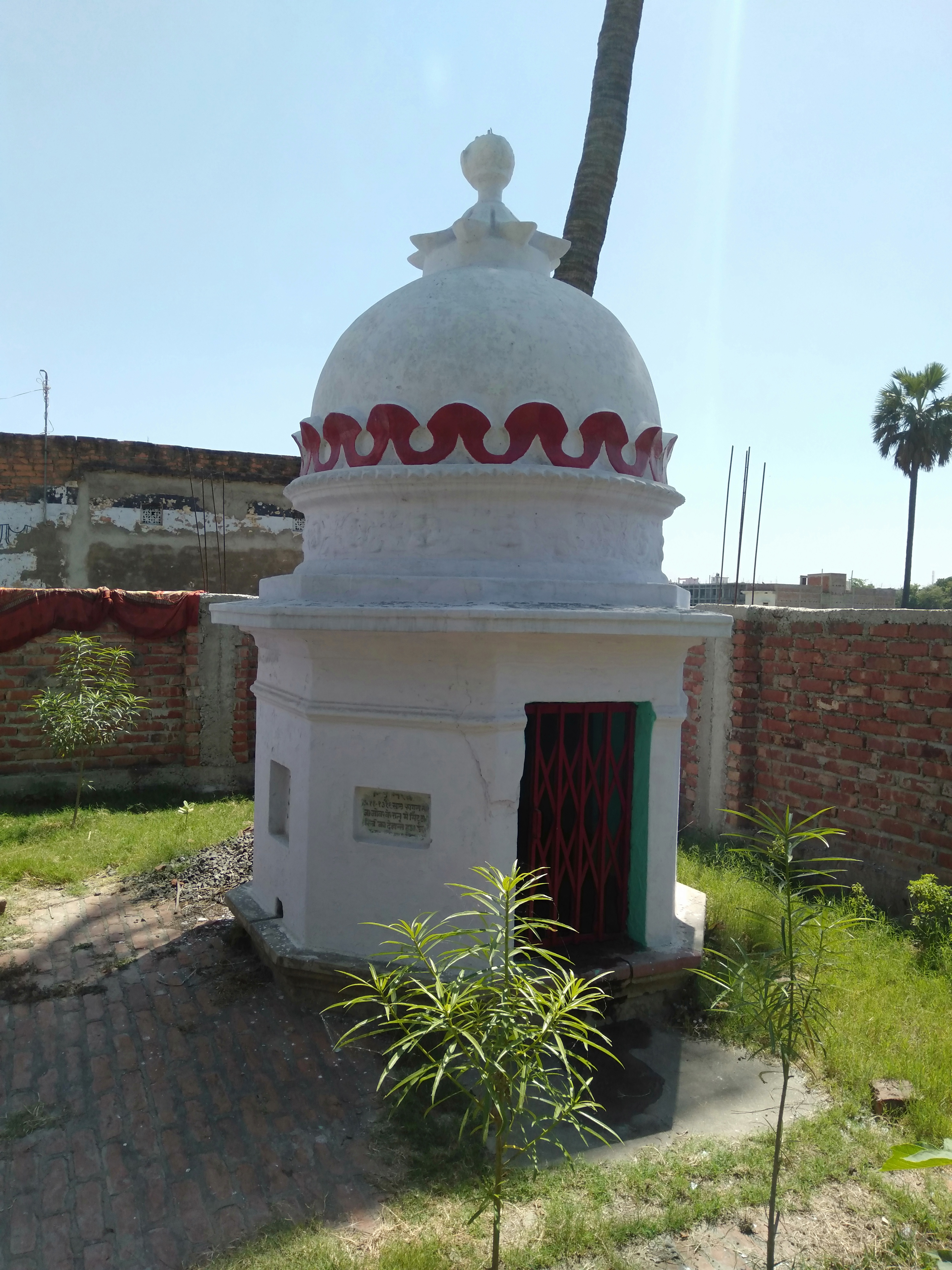
View of Gangeswari Devi Tomb (wife of Mitthu Mistri Thakur) located at Chunabatti, Darbhanga District, Bihar, India.

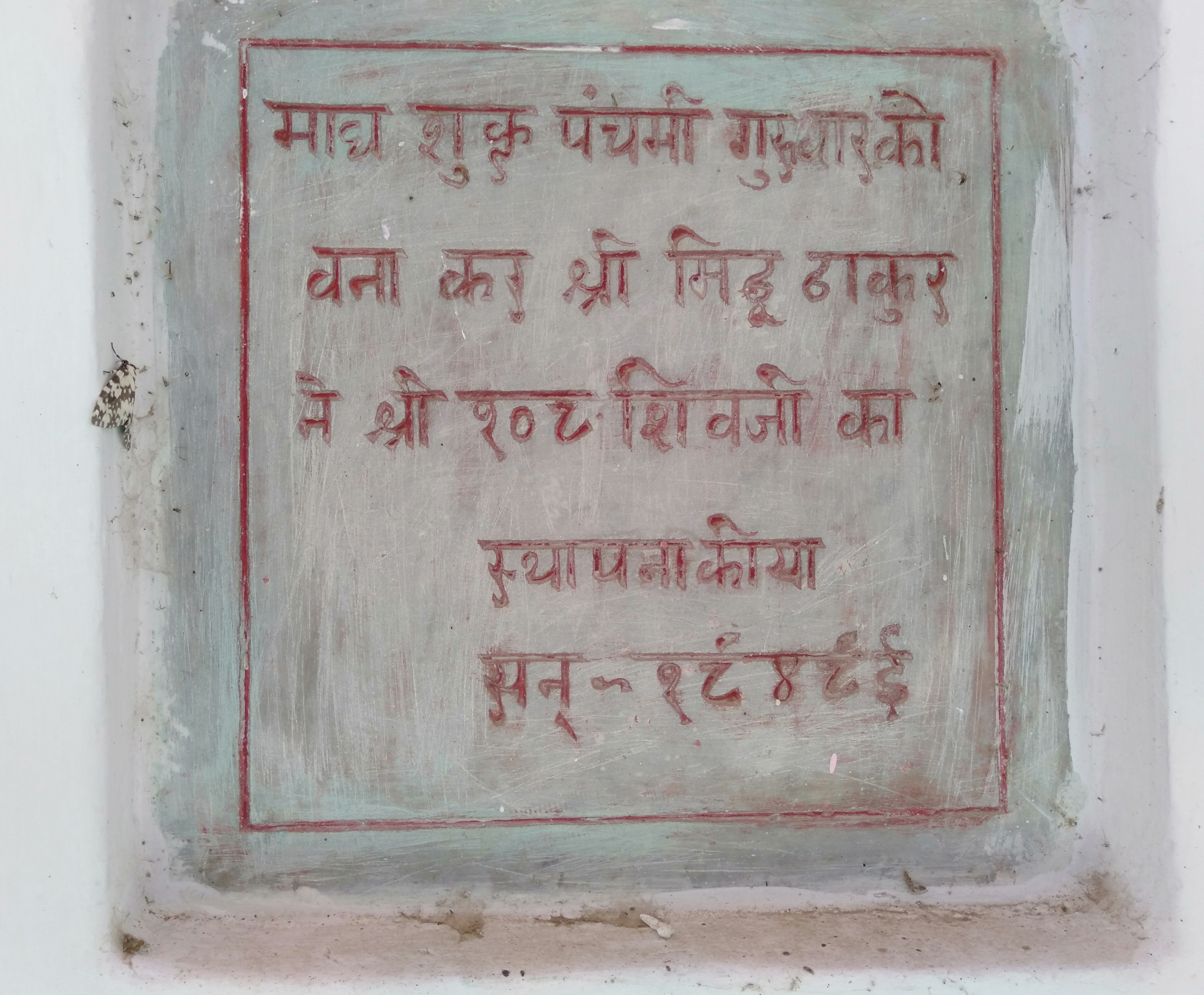
Cornerstone of Mitheswarnath Shiv Temple.

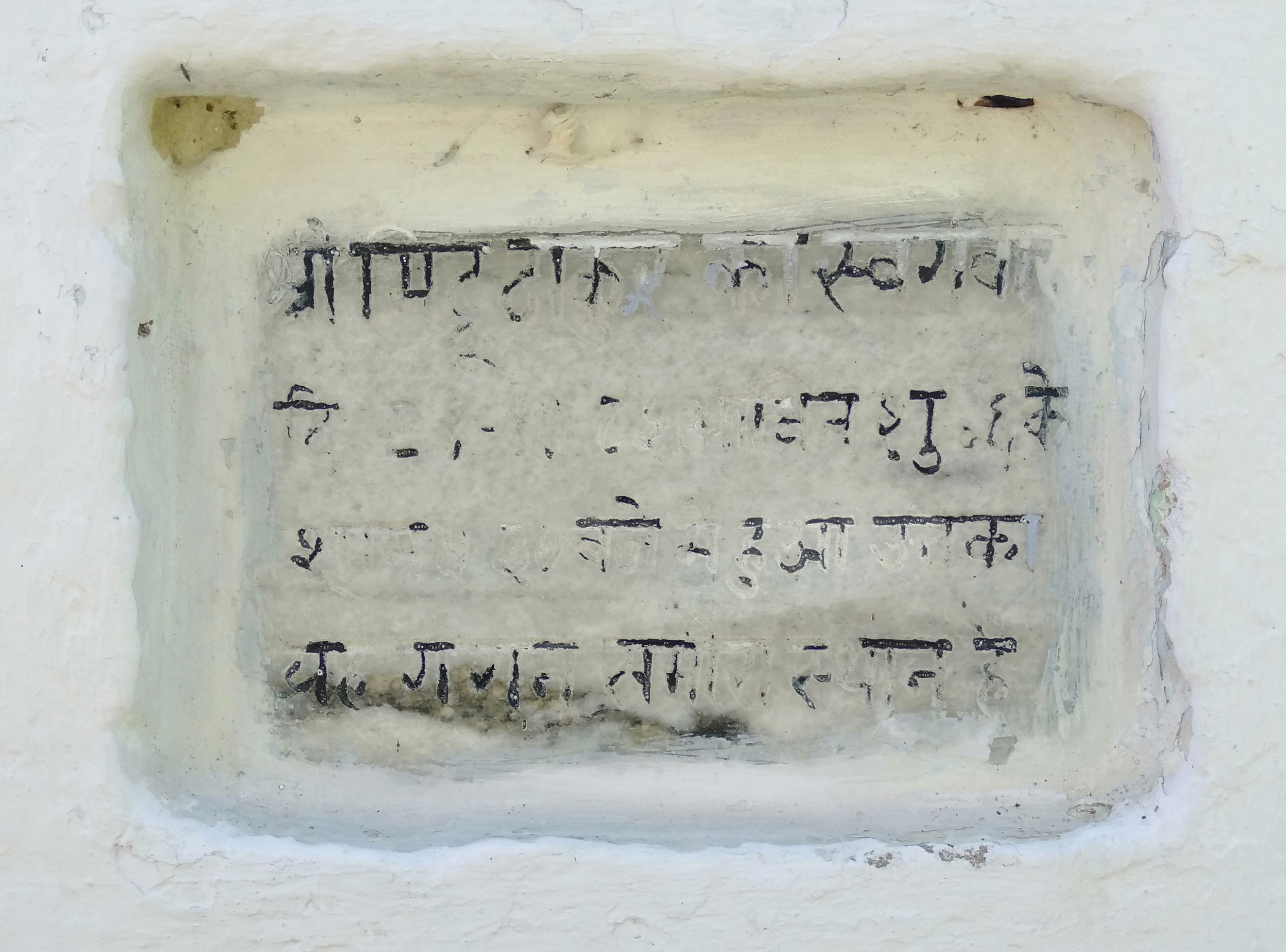
Cornerstone of Mitthu Mistri Tomb.

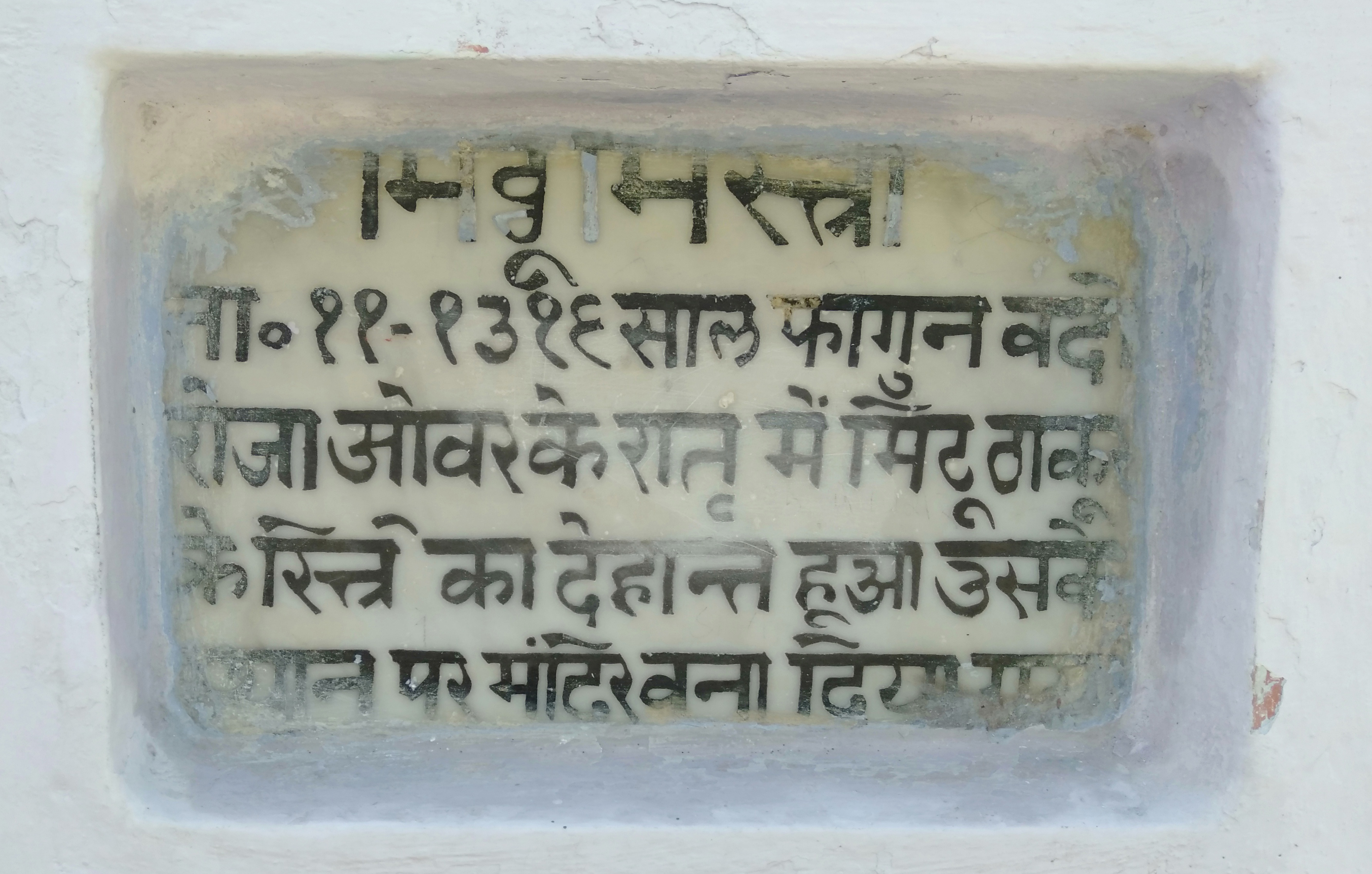
Cornerstone of Gangeswari Devi Tomb.
