= Raghopur, Supaul =

Blocks in Supaul district, Bihar

Raghopur राघोपुर (Hindi)
- Block
- Interactive map of Raghopur
- Coordinates: 26.29807°N 86.83585°E
- Country: India
- State: Bihar
- District: Supaul
- Villages: 58

Area
  - Total: 251.01 km^{2} (96.92 sq mi)
- Elevation: 63 m (207 ft)

Population (2011)
  - Total: 215,643
  - Density: 859.10/km^{2} (2,225.1/sq mi)

Languages
  - Official: Maithili, Hindi
- Time zone: UTC+5:30 (IST)
- PIN: 85211
- Vehicle registration: BR-50
- Lok Sabha constituency: Supaul
- Vidhan Sabha constituency: Nirmali

Raghopur (/ˈrɑːɡhoʊpʊr/) is a block of Supaul district in the Kosi Division of Bihar. It is one of the 11 administrative block of Supaul district and lies under Birpur sub-division, with its seat being in the Raghopur. At the 2011 Indian census, the block had a population of 215,643 people living in 41,516 households. It is connected by the National Highway 27 and National Highway 131. The block area covers 251.01 km^{2} (96.92 sq mi) and comprises 58 villages.

== Geography ==
Raghopur lies east of the Kosi River and 37 km (23 mi) north of the district headquarters Supaul. Its average elevation is 63 metres above sea level. It is historically part of the Mithila region.

== Demography ==
In the 2011 India census, Raghopur block comprises 41,516 households with a total population of 215,643. Among the total population, 111,153 are male, and 104,490 are female. The total literacy rate is 56%.

== Transport ==
The National highway 27 and National highway 131 pass through the block, providing direct access to major cities in Bihar and neighboring states. The Raghopur railway station further enhances connectivity, linking the region to various destinations across India. These transport networks significantly help the movement of goods and people, supporting both local commerce and tourism.
