= List of Shiva temples in India =

Shiva is one of the principal deities in Hinduism and is considered part of the Trimurti alongside Brahma and Vishnu. Numerous temples dedicated to Shiva exist across India and beyond, often featuring lingams as representations of the deity. Hindu scriptures describe the worship of Shiva and the establishment of temples and shrines across the Indian subcontinent. Among these, the Jyotirlinga temples are considered particularly significant within Shaivism.

== The 12 Jyotirlinga temples ==
The 12 Jyotirlinga temples as mentioned in the Shiva Purana are :-

#	Jyotirlinga		Location
1	Somnath		Veraval, Gujarat
2	Mallikarjuna Swamy		Srisailam, Andhra Pradesh
3	Mahakaleshwar		Ujjain, Madhya Pradesh
4	Omkareshwar		near Indore, Madhya Pradesh
5	Kedarnath		Kedarnath, Uttarakhand
6	Bhimashankar		Pune, Maharashtra
7	Kashi Vishwanath		Varanasi, Uttar Pradesh
8	Trimbakeshwar		Trimbak, near Nashik, Maharashtra
9	Baidyanath	Baidyanath Dham	Deoghar, Jharkhand
10	Nageshwar		Dwarka, Gujarat
11	Ramanathaswamy		Rameswaram, Tamil Nadu
12	Grishneshwar		Ellora, Maharashtra

== Pancha Bhuta Sthalams (Five Elemental Manifestations) ==
In South India, five temples of Shiva are held to be particularly important, as being manifestations of him in the five elemental substances.

Deity	Manifestation	Location
Jambukeswarar	Water	Thiruvanaikaval, Tamil Nadu
Arunachaleswarar	Fire	Tiruvannamalai, Tamil Nadu
Kalahastheeswarar	Air	Srikalahasti, Andhra Pradesh
Ekambareswarar	Earth	Kanchipuram, Tamil Nadu
Natarajar	Sky	Chidambaram, Tamil Nadu

== Pancharama temples ==
The Pancharama Kshetras (or the Pancharamas) are five ancient Hindu temples of Shiva situated in Andhra Pradesh. The lingams at these temples are made from a single lingam. As per the legend, this lingam was owned by the demon king Tarakasura. No one could win over him due to the power of this lingam. Finally, Kartikeya, the son of Shiva broke the lingam into five pieces and killed Tarakasura. The five pieces of lingam fell at five different places on earth namely,

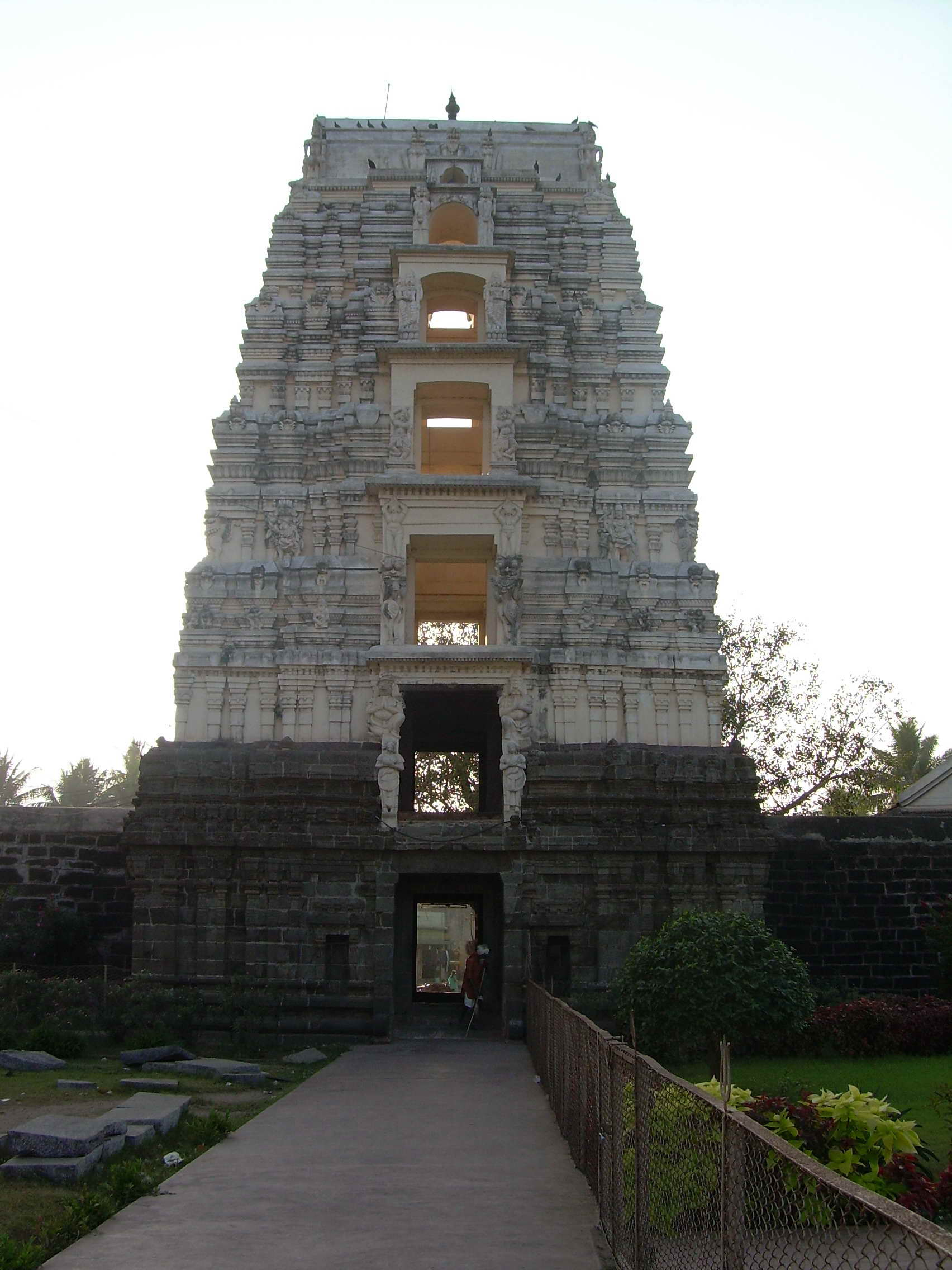
Bhimesvara Swamy Temple in Draksharama, one of the Pancharama Kshetras

Arama Name	Shiva's Name	Consort Name	Location
Amararama	Amaralingeswara Swamy	Bala Chamundika Ammavaru	Amaravathi village, Andhra Pradesh
Draksharama	Bhimesvara Swamy	Manikyamba Ammavaru	Draksharama, Andhra Pradesh
Somarama	Someswara Swamy	Sri Rajarajeswari Ammavaru	Bhimavaram, Andhra Pradesh
Ksheerarama	Ksheera Ramalingeswara Swamy	Parvati Ammavaru	Palakollu, Andhra Pradesh
Bhimarama	Kumara Bhimeswara Swamy	Bala Tripurasundari Ammavaru	Samalkota, Andhra Pradesh

== Pancha Sabhai ==
The five temples located in Tamil Nadu where Shiva is believed to perform the tandava dance are:

Sabha	Temple	Location
Pon (Gold) Sabha	Natarajar Temple	Chidambaram
Velli (Silver) Sabha	Meenakshi Temple	Madurai
Thamira (Copper) Sabha	Nellaiappar Temple	Tirunelveli
Rathna (Gem) Sabha	Sri Vadaranyeswarar Temple	Thiruvalangadu
Chitira (Picture) Sabha	Kutraleeswar Temple	Kutralam

== Ashta Veeratta Temples ==
Temple	Deity	Commemorates	Location
Veerateeswarar Temple, Thirukovilur	Veerateeswarar	Shiva slaying Andhakasura in the form of Andhakasuramurti	Tirukoilur
Veerateeswarar Temple, Thiruvathigai	Veerateeswarar	Shiva killing Tripurasura and destroying the three cities in the form of Tripurantaka	Panruti
Veerateeswarar Temple, Korukkai	Veerateeswarar	Shiva burning Kamadeva with his third eye in the form of Kamari	Mayiladuthurai
Kandeeswarar Temple, Kandiyur	Brahmasirakandeeswarar	Shiva decapitating the fifth head of Brahma in the form of Bhairava	Thanjavur
Amritaghateswarar-Abirami Temple, Thirukkadaiyur	Amritaghateswarar	Shiva defeating Yama and blessing Markandeya to remain a youth of 16 in the form of Kalantaka	Mayiladuthurai
Veerateeswarar Temple, Thirupariyalur	Veerateeswarar	Shiva beheading Daksha and destroyed Daksha Yajna in the form of Virabhadra	Mayiladuthurai
Veerateeswarar Temple, Vazhuvur	Veerateeswarar	Shiva killing Gajasura in the form of Gajasurasamhara	Mayiladuthurai
Veerateeswarar Temple, Thiruvirkudi	Veerateeswarar	Shiva killing Jalandhara in the form of Jalandharari	Mayiladuthurai

== Shani Parihara Temples ==
Sabha	Temple	Location
Sani Parihara Sthalam	Tirunallar Saniswaran Temple	Thirunallaru, Puducherry
Sani Parihara Sthalam	Sri Darbarneeswarar Temple	Devasthanam
Shani Parihara	Chenchadainathar Shiva Temple	Sayalkudi, Tamil Nadu
Shani Parihara	Sri Mandeswara Swamy Vari Devasthanam	Konaseema district, Andhra Pradesh

== Kashiswar Jiu temple ==
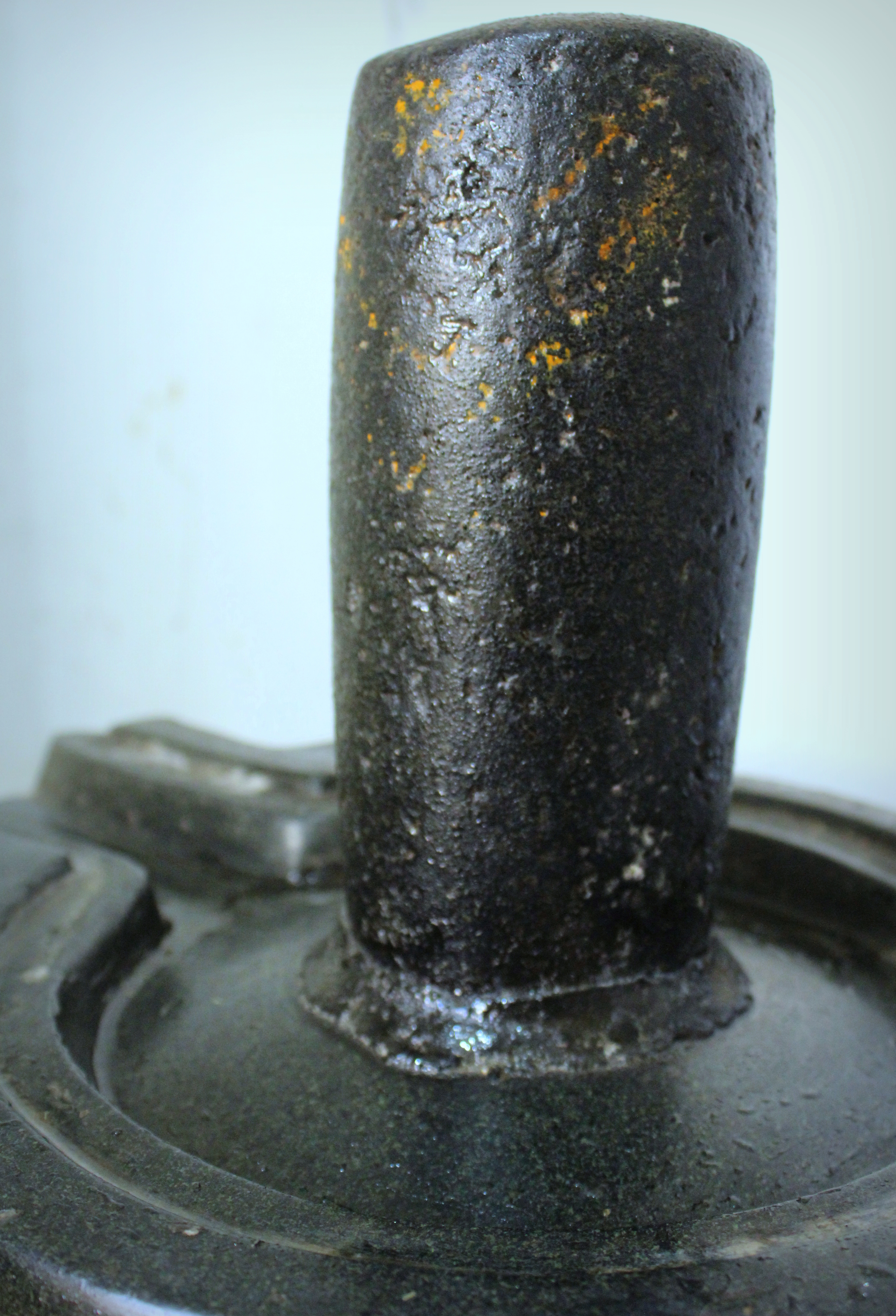
The deity Kashiswar Jiu with the gauripatta in the temple.

Kashiswar Jiu temple is in Andul of Howrah district near the Saraswati river, West Bengal in India. The presiding deity is a Banlinga which was recovered from the river in mid 17th century by Kashiswar Datta Chowdhury, a local zamindar. In 18th century a stone made yoni-like structure (Gauripatta) that symbolizes goddess Shakti has been attached with the lingam after Bargi attacked in 1741 AD. The deity is considered to be one of the oldest in the district.

Other deities with Kashiswar Jiu
Deities	Year
Biseshwara	1785 AD
Nakuleshwara	19th century circa
Saurendra Mohaneshwara	18th century circa

The temples are presently run by SrisriKashiswar Debottur Trust.

== Notable temples ==
=== Andhra Pradesh ===
- Pancharama Kshetras
- Gudimallam Lingam, Gudimallam Parashurameshwara Swami Temple, Gudimallam
- Kapila Theertham, Tirupati
- Kotappakonda
- Kukkuteswara Temple, East Godavari
- Mallikarjuna Temple, Srisailam
- Pallikondeswara Temple, Surutupalle
- Tripuranthakeswara Temple, Tripuranthakam
- Veerabhadra Temple, Pattiseema
- Yaganti temple, Sri Yaganti Uma Maheswara Temple, Nandyal district

=== Assam ===
- Mahabhairav Temple, Tezpur
- Sivasagar Sivadol, Sivasagar
- Sukreswar Temple, Guwahati
- Umananda Temple, Guwahati

=== Bihar ===
Araria district

- Sundarnath Temple, Araria

Bhagalpur district

- Burhanath Temple, Bhagalpur
- Budhanath Temple, Bhagalpur

Buxar district

- Shri Adinath Akhara, Buxar

Darbhanga district

- Mittheswarnath Shiv Temple, Chunabhatti

Kaimur district

- Mundeshwari Temple, Ramgarh

Lakhisarai district

- Ashokdham Temple

Madhubani district

- Kapileshwar Temple, Rahika
- Parasmaninath Temple, Madhubani
- Ugna Mahadev Temple, Bhawanipur
- Kalyaneshwar Mahadev Mandir
- Gandiveshwar Sthan
- Dakshineswar Nath Mahadev Mandir

Muzaffarpur district

- Baba Garib Sthan Mandir, Muzaffarpur

Patna district

- Nair temple, Patna

Samastipur district

- Khudneshwar Asthan Morwa, Morwa

Vaishali district

- Chaumukhi Mahadev, Basarh
- Lal Keshwar Shiv Temple
- Pataleshwar Mandir

=== Chhattisgarh ===
- Bhoramdeo Temple
- Mahadev Temple, Deobaloda

=== Goa ===
- Mahadev Temple, Tambdi Surla
- Mangueshi Temple
- Nagueshi Temple, Bandora
- Ramnathi Temple, Bandora
- Saptakoteshwar, Narve
- Vimleshwar Temple, Rivona

=== Gujarat ===
- Somnath temple, Veraval
- Nagnath Temple, Dwaraka

=== Jammu and Kashmir ===
- Amarnath

=== Karnataka ===
- Bhoganandishwara Temple, Chikkaballapur
- Dharmasthala Temple, Dakshina Kannada
- Hoysaleswara Temple, Halebidu
- Kadri Manjunath Temple, Dakshina Kannada
- Kotilingeshwara, Kolar
- Mahabaleshwar Temple, Gokarna, Uttara Kannada
- Murudeshwara, Uttara Kannada
- Srikanteshwara Temple, Nanjangud

=== Kerala ===
- Aluva Mahadeva Temple
- Chengannur Mahadeva Temple, Chengannur
- Chowalloor Siva Temple, Guruvayoor
- Elannummel Shiva Temple
- Ernakulam Shiva Temple, Ernakulam
- Ettumanoor Mahadevar Temple, Ettumanoor
- Jagannath Temple, Thalassery
- Kolathukara Shiva Temple
- Kottiyoor Temple, Kottiyoor
- Mammiyoor Temple, Guruvayoor
- Pazhaya Sreekanteswaram Temple
- Peruvanam Mahadeva Temple, cherpu, Thrissur
- Poonkunnam Siva Temple, Punkunnam
- Rajarajeshwara Temple, Taliparamba
- Sree Bhavaneeswara Temple, Palluruthy
- Sreekanteswaram, Thiruvananthapuram
- Thirunakkara Sree Mahadevar Temple
- Thiru Nayathode Siva Narayana Temple
- Thiruvanchikulam Temple, kodungallur
- Vadakkunnathan Temple, Thrissur
- Vaikom Temple, Vaikom
- Vazhappally Maha Siva Temple

=== Madhya Pradesh ===
Chhatarpur District

- Brahma Temple at Khajuraho
- Duladeo Temple at Khajuraho
- Lalguan Mahadeva Temple at Khajuraho
- Matangeshvara Temple at Khajuraho
- Vishvanatha Temple at Khajuraho

Hoshangabad District

- Jatashankar Cave Temple at Pachmarhi

Khandwa District

- Omkareshwar Temple at Mandhata or Shivpuri

Mandsaur District

- Pashupatinath Temple at Mandsaur

Morena District

- Kakanmath Temple at Sihoniya

Neemuch District

- Sukhanand Mahadev Ji Temple at Jawad

Raisen District

- Bhojeshwar Temple at Bhojpur

Seoni District

- Shri Kala Bhairava Nath Swami Temple at Adegaon

Ujjain District

- Kal Bhairav Temple at Ujjain
- Mahakaleshwar Jyotirlinga Temple at Ujjain
- Mangalnath Temple at Ujjain

=== Maharashtra ===
Aurangabad District

- Kailasa Temple at Ellora Caves
- Grishneshwar Temple at Verul

Beed District

- Shri Vaijnath Temple at Parli Vaijnath

Kolhapur District

- Kopeshwar Temple, Khidrapur

Mumbai City District

- Babulnath Temple at Malabar Hill
- Walkeshwar Temple at Walkeshwar

Nashik District

- Gondeshwar Temple at Sinnar
- Trimbakeshwar Shiva Temple at Trimbak City

Palghar District

- Shiv Mandir, Maharashtra at Vangaon
- Tungareshwar Temple at Vasai

Pune District

- Bhimashankar Temple at Pune District

Thane District

- Shiv Mandir, Ambarnath

=== Odisha ===
- Akhandalamani Temple, Bhadrak
- Baba Bhusandeswar Temple, Balasore
- Chandaneswar, Balasore
- Dhabaleswar, Cuttack
- Gupteswar Cave temple, Jeypore
- Kapilash Temple, Dhenkanal
- Leaning Temple of Huma, Sambalpur
- Lingaraja Temple, Bhubaneswar
- Mahavinayak Temple, Jajpur
- Mukteshvara Temple, Bhubaneswar
- Parashurameshvara Temple, Bhubaneswar

=== Punjab ===
- Mukteshwar Mahadev Temple, Pathankot

=== Rajasthan ===
- Sabli Temple, Dungarpur district
- Rameshwar Mahadev Temple, Bundi District

=== Sikkim ===
- Kirateshwar Mahadev Temple, Legship

=== Tamil Nadu ===
- Adi Kumbeswarar Temple, Kumbakonam
- Airavatesvara Temple, Darasuram
- Ardhanareeswarar Temple, Tiruchengode
- Arunachalesvara Temple, Tiruvannamalai
- Bhavani Sangameswarar Temple, Bhavani
- Brihadisvara Temple, Thanjavur
- Chandra Choodeswarar Temple, Hosur
- Isha Foundation, Coimbatore
- Jalantheeswarar Temple, Thakkolam
- Kapaleeshwarar Temple, Chennai
- Kasi Viswanathar Temple, Tenkasi
- Koorainadu Punukeeswarar Temple, Mayiladuthurai
- Marundeeswarar Temple, Chennai
- Masilamaniswara Temple, Thirumullaivoyal
- Mayuranathaswami Temple, Mayiladuthurai
- Meenakshi Temple, Madurai
- Pariyur Kondathu Kaliamman Temple, Pariyur
- Perur Pateeswarar Temple, Coimbatore
- Sankaranayinarkoil, Sankarankovil
- Sathyanatheswarar Temple, Kanchipuram
- Thayumanaswami Temple, Tiruchirappalli
- Thyagaraja Temple, Tiruvottiyur
- Thyagaraja Temple, Tiruvarur
- Vedapureeswarar Temple, Thiruverkadu
- Virundeeswarar Temple, Coimbatore

=== Telangana ===
- Chaya Someswara Temple, Nalgonda
- Kaleshwara Mukteswara Swamy Temple, Kaleshwaram
- Keesaragutta Temple, Keesaragutta
- Raja Rajaeshwara Temple, Vemulavada
- Ramappa Temple, Warangal

=== Uttarakhand ===
- Baijnath, Uttarakhand
- Baleshwar Temple, Champawat
- Daksheswar Mahadev Temple, Kankhal
- Gopinath Mandir, Chamoli Gopeshwar
- Jageshwar, Almora
- Kalpeshwar
- Kedarnath Temple, Kedarnath
- Madhyamaheshwar
- Neelkanth Mahadev Temple, near Rishikesh
- Panch Kedar
- Rudranath
- Rudreshwar Mahadev Temple
- Tungnath, Chamoli district

=== Uttar Pradesh ===
- Ghuisarnath Temple, Pratapgarh
- Hajari Mahadev Temple, Etawah
- Lodheshwar Mahadev Mandir, Barabanki
- Shivdwar Uma Maheshwar Temple, Sonbhadra
- Waneshwar Mahadev Temple, Kanpur
- Kashi Vishwanath Temple, Varanasi, Uttar Pradesh

=== West Bengal ===
- Byaspur Shiva Temple
- Ekteswar Temple
- Jalpesh Temple
- Mahakal Temple, Darjeeling
- Tarakeswar

== See also ==
- 108 Shiva Temples
