= Valeesvarar Temple, Karikkarai =

Hindu temple in Ramagiri, Andhra Pradesh, India

Valeesvarar Temple is a Hindu temple dedicated to the deity Shiva, located at Ramagiri, also known as Ramagiri, in Tirupati district in Andhra Pradesh (India).

== Vaippu Sthalam ==
It is one of the shrines of the Vaippu Sthalams sung by Tamil Saivite Nayanar Sundarar. This place is also known as Thirukkarikkarai, as it is on the banks of Cauvery.

== Presiding deity ==
The presiding deity in the garbhagriha, represented by the lingam, is known as Valeesvarar. The Goddess is known as Maragadhambal.

== Specialities ==
As per the order of Rama, Anjaneya brought the Linga from North India in order to consecrate it at Sethu. Bairava made a plan to possess the Linga. As per the plan Anjanaye was made to feel thirsty. As the Linga should not be kept in floor, he gave it to Bairava who came as a boy. Before his return Bairava put it on the floor. Anjaneya tried to take it from the place but in vain. There itself Linga was consecrated. As Anjaneya tried to pull the Linga by his tail, the presiding deity was known as Valisvarar. The hill which was thrown by Anjaneya fell on a water body known as Kalingamadu. Later it took the form of a mountain. As the Linga was bought for doing puja by Rama it was known as Ram and as the water body became a mountain it was known as 'Giri' (hill). So this place was known as Ramagiri. This temple is also known as Bairava temple. From the mouth of Nandi water is coming at all times. The temple tank was filled and later became a river known as Kariyaru. Generally in Shiva temples in front of presiding deity, Nandhi could be found. But in this temple instead of Nandi, Anjaneya is found. No Pradosha festival held in this temple.

== Structure ==
The temple is without gopura. After going through the entrance in the left Nandhi tirtha is found. On its bank the shrine of Vinayaka and the shrine of the Goddess are found. In the kosta, Dakshinamurthy, Brahma and Durga are found. Kali, Vishnu, Subramania, Virabhadra in sitting posture and Surya are also found in this temple. The presiding deity is found in a slanting posture. This temple belonged to Pallava period. Later Vijayanagara kings renovated the structure. When Sangamakula Virupatcharayan made attempt to build the gopura, Purushotthama Gajapathy came on war with him. So the work was halted. According to the inscription "Jayamkonda Cholamandalatthu Kundravartthana Kottatthu Nattu Naduvin Malai Thirukkari Karai Pillayar". After the war with Chalukya, Veera Rajanedra Chola on his return made donations.

== Location ==
The temple is located next to Nagalapuram in Tirupati district in Andhra Pradesh. In Chennai-Uthukottai-Surattappalli-Nagalapuram route this temple can be reached. This temple is opened for worship from 8.00 a.m. to 11.00 a.m. and 3.00 p.m. to 6.00 p.m.
