= Siddi Raju Kandriga =

- Village
- Country: India
- State: Andhra Pradesh
- District: Tirupati
- Talukas: Pitchatur

Population (February 2015)
  - Total: 1,800

Languages
  - Official: Telugu
- Time zone: UTC+5:30 (IST)
- PIN: 517589
- Telephone code: 08576
- Nearest city: Tirupati
- Lok Sabha constituency: Tirupati
- Vidhan Sabha constituency: Satyavedu
- Climate: hot and dry for most of the year. (Köppen)

Siddi Raju Kandriga is a village near Puttur in Andhra Pradesh state and comes under Pitchatur Mandal limits. The village president is Jayachandra Naidu. The PIN code of the village is 517589.
