= Ramagiri, Tirupati district =

Ramagiri
- Village
- Interactive map of Ramagiri
- Location in Andhra Pradesh, India Ramagiri (India)
- Coordinates: 13.405426°N 79.76671°E
- Country: India
- State: Andhra Pradesh
- District: Chittoor
- Mandal: Pitchatur

Languages
  - Official: Telugu,
- Time zone: UTC+5:30 (IST)

Ramagiri is one of the villages in Pitchatur Mandal, Chittoor District, Andhra Pradesh State in India. Ramagiri is located 76.85 km distance from its District Main City Chittoor.
