= Tungareshwar Temple =

Hindu temple in Maharashtra, India

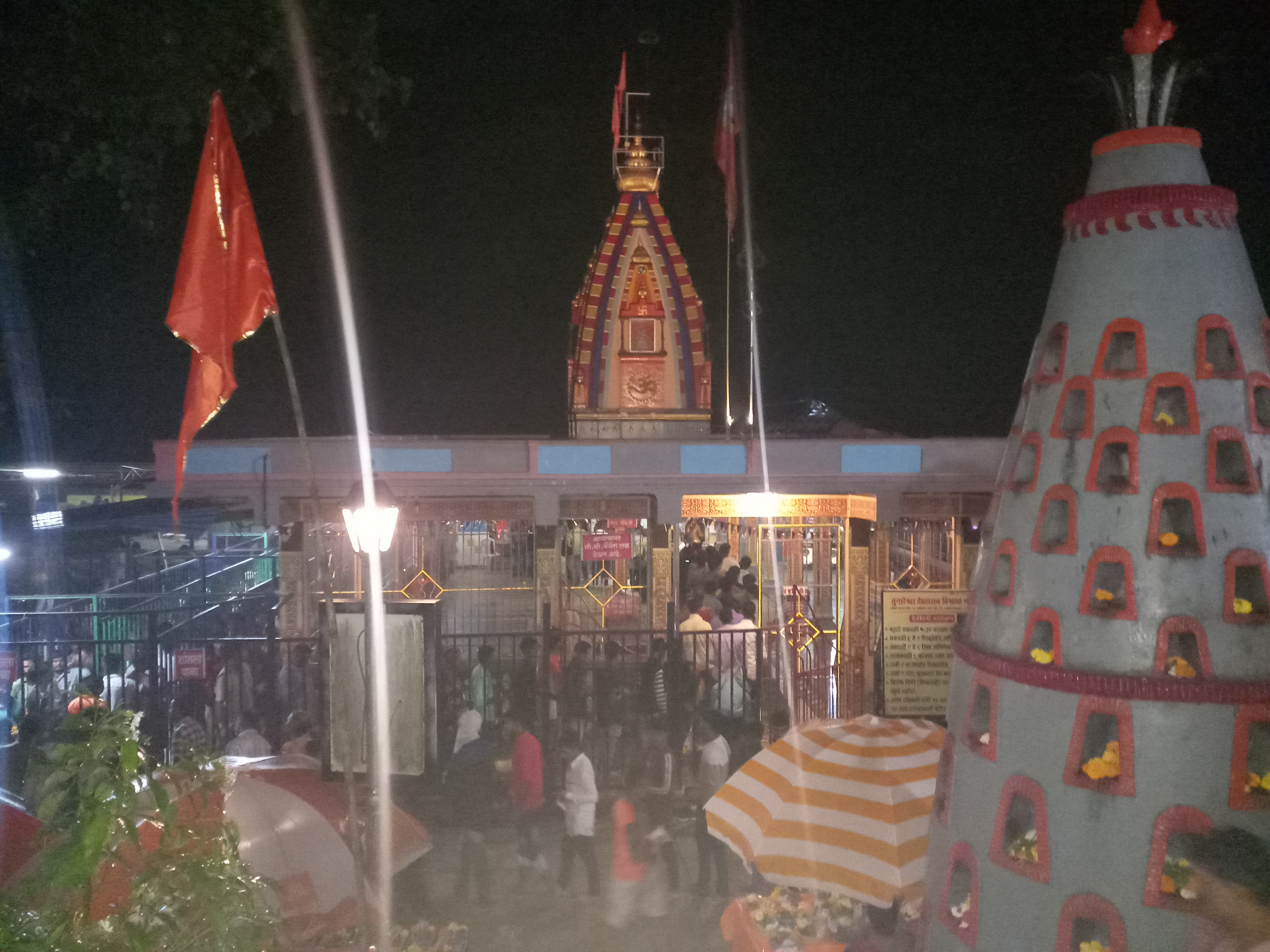
- View of Tungareshwar Temple at Vasai (click on the first day of the Shravan month in 2019).

- Location within Maharashtra Location within India Location within Asia

Religion
- Affiliation: Hinduism
- District: Palghar
- Deity: Shiva
- Festivals: Maha Shivratri & Shraavana

Location
- Location: Vasai
- State: Maharashtra
- Country: India
- Coordinates: 19°24′59.4″N 72°54′05.4″E

Architecture
- Type: Hindu Temple

Tungareshwar Temple is located in Vasai (2177 feet above the ground on the highest Mountain plateau of Tungareshwar), Palghar District, Maharashtra, India. The temple is dedicated to the Hindu god Shiva, about 3 to 4 kilometers from the "Tungareshwar Entrance Gate," and opens in the morning from 5:00 am to 6:00 pm. This is a Lord Shiva temple and also has a Ram Kund in the backside area (Kunds are human-made small water bodies). Alongside the Tungareshwar Temple, a small temple of Goddess "Khodiyaar Mataji" (with her vehicle, a crocodile). Being said about God and Goddess, Tungareshwar attracts devotees who visit both these temples at special occasions and festival seasons like "Khodiyar Jayanti," which comes in around February, and "Maha Shivratri" in Shravana Months as per the Hindu calendar, falling between July and August every year. Bhandara (a religious, publicly organized feast) takes place every year at the "Mahashivratri Festival" and every Monday at the Shravan month.

== History and legend ==
Tungareshwar, a collection of five mountains, houses some very holy temples like those of Shiva, Kal Bhairav (the avatar of Shiva), Jagmata Temple (the avatar of Parvati, wife of Lord Shiva), the Balyogi Sadanandh Maharaj Matth. According to the legends, Lord Parashurama killed a Demon named 'Tunga' at this place. The temple was built in the honor of Lord Parashurama. Lord Parashurama meditated here in this place. It is believed that Adi Shankaracharya had meditated at a place nearby Shuparak, now called Sopara or Nalasopara.

== Architecture ==
This temple is situated in a garden. A tridente is positioned on the dome, visible against the horizon. The temple room is small and decorated with colourful glasswork. A diya is kept in one corner of the room, alongside a small temple of Devi. In the center, there is the Main Ling – Lord Shiva, with a serpent in brass coiled around it. A brass vessel is suspended above the lingam, allowing water to drip from it over the Shivling. The temple also has some symbols of sacred geometry, and the temple is designed as per Vaastu Shastra.

== Gallery ==
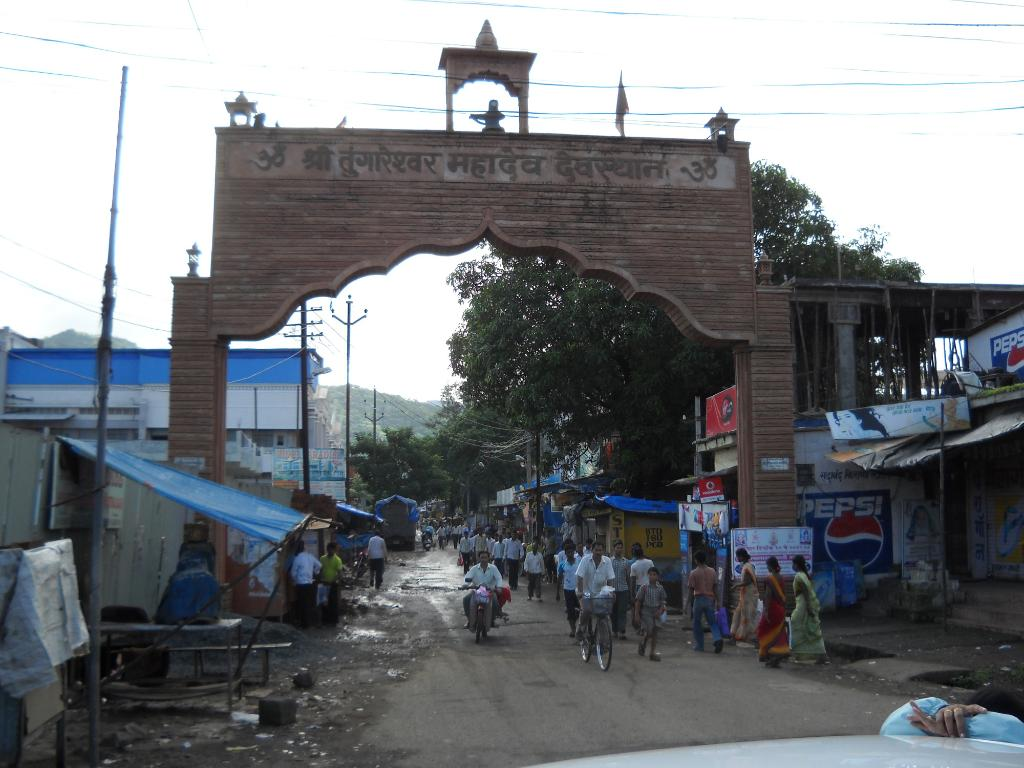
View of Tungareshwar Entrance Gate, Vasai.

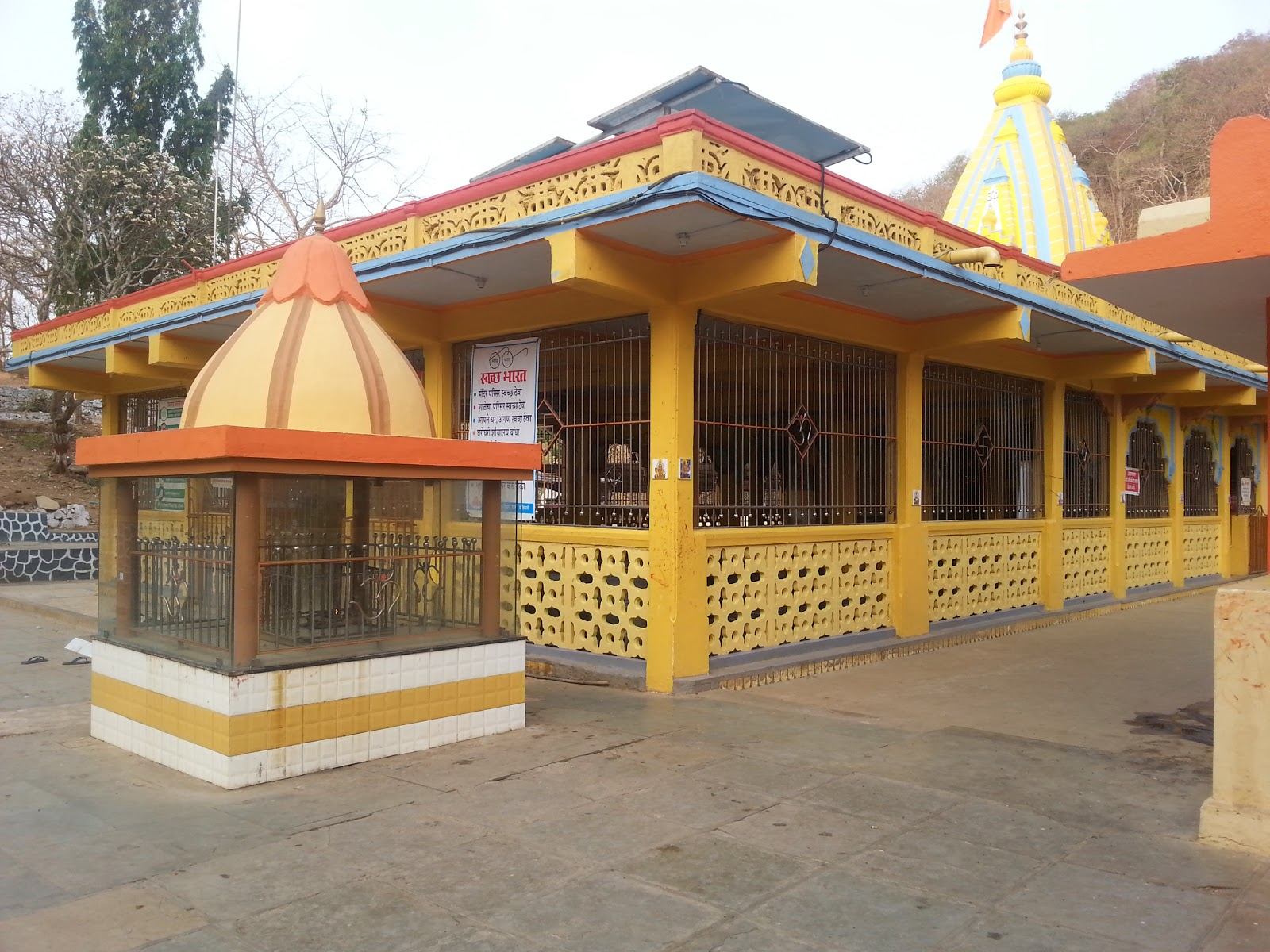
Close View of Tungareshwar Temple at Vasai.

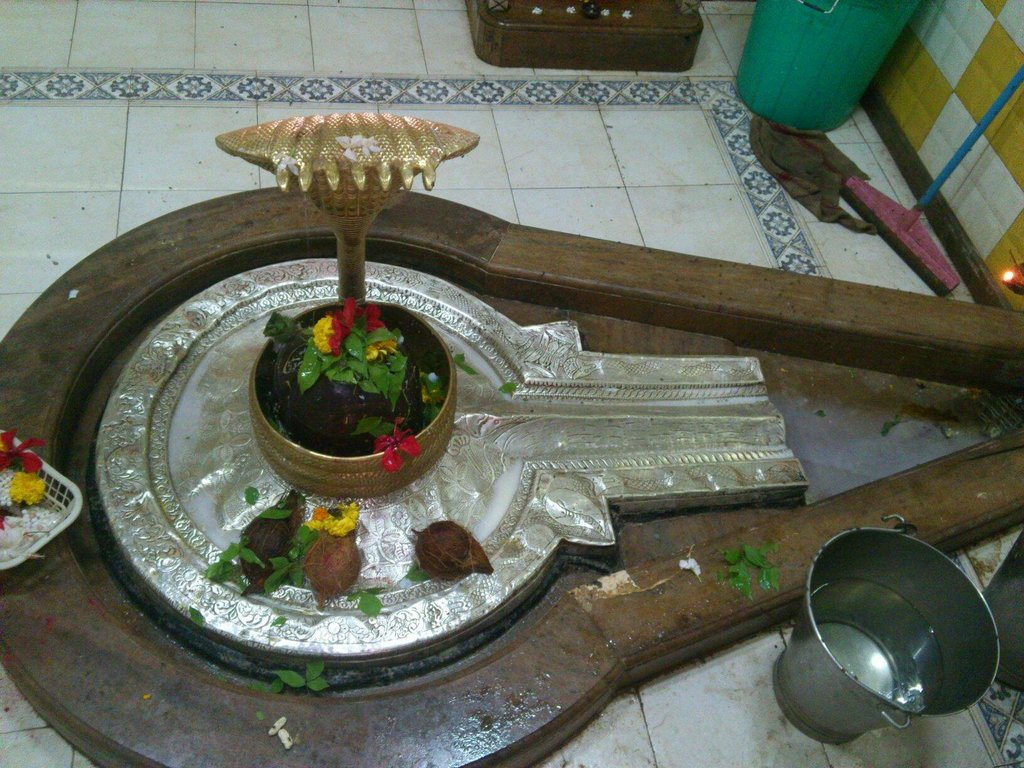
View of Tungareshwar Temple Shiv Ling.

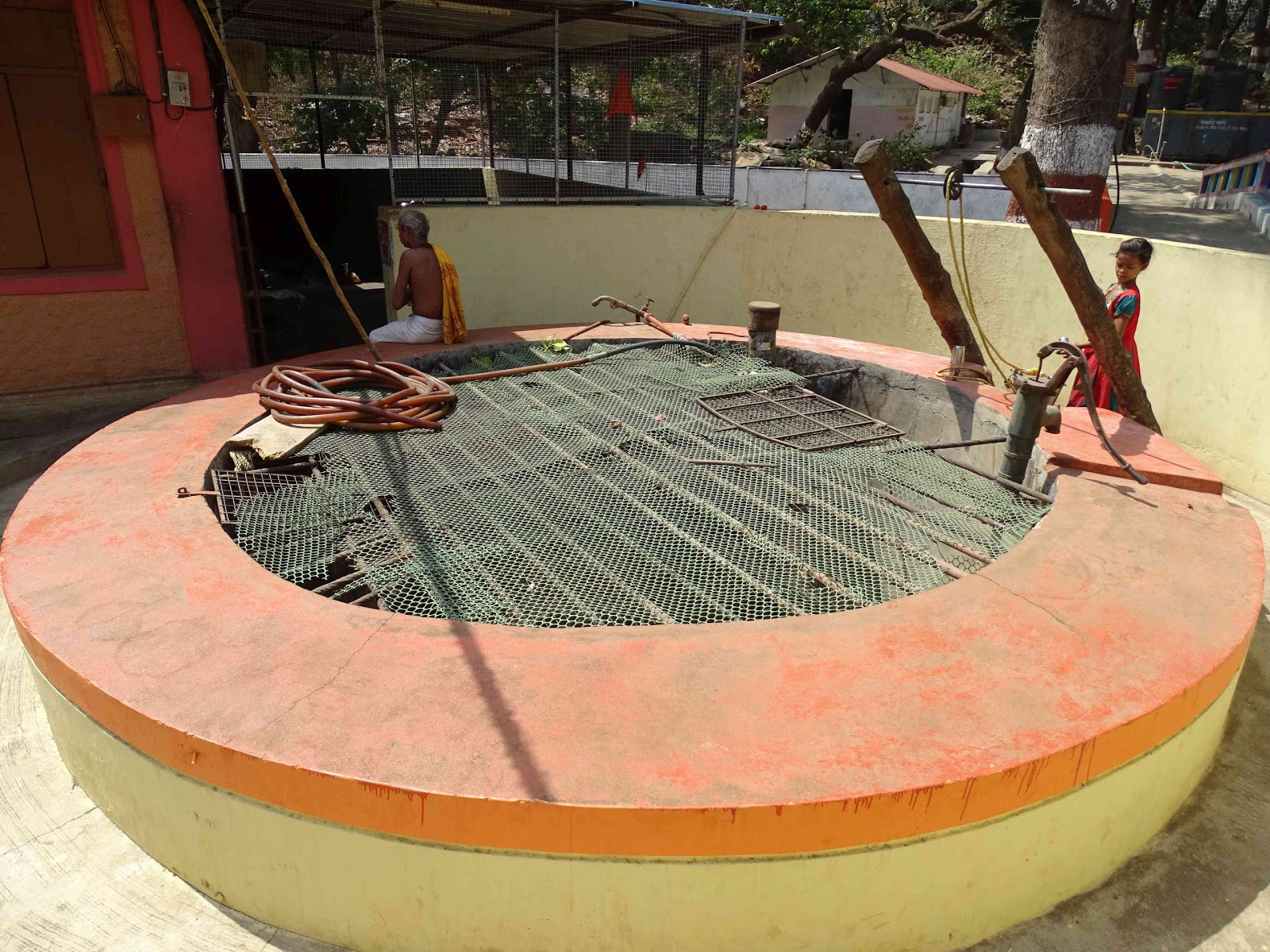
View of Ram Kund at Tungareshwar Temple.

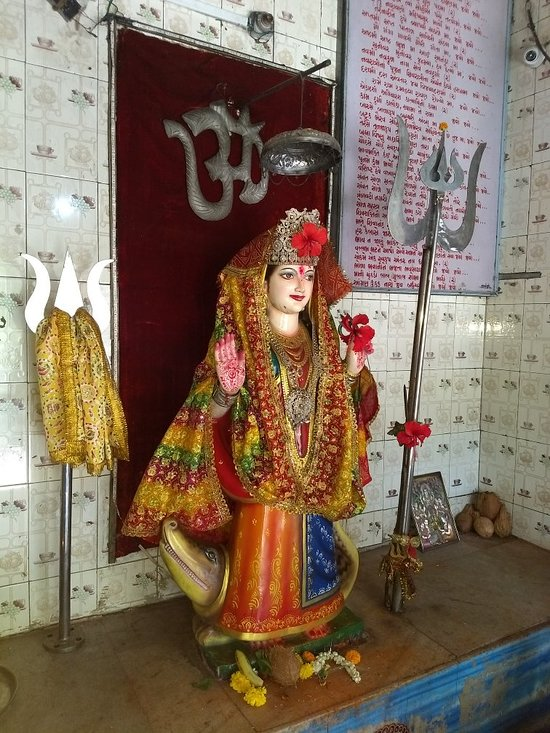
View of A small temple of Goddess Khodiyaar Mataji (with her vehicle crocodile)

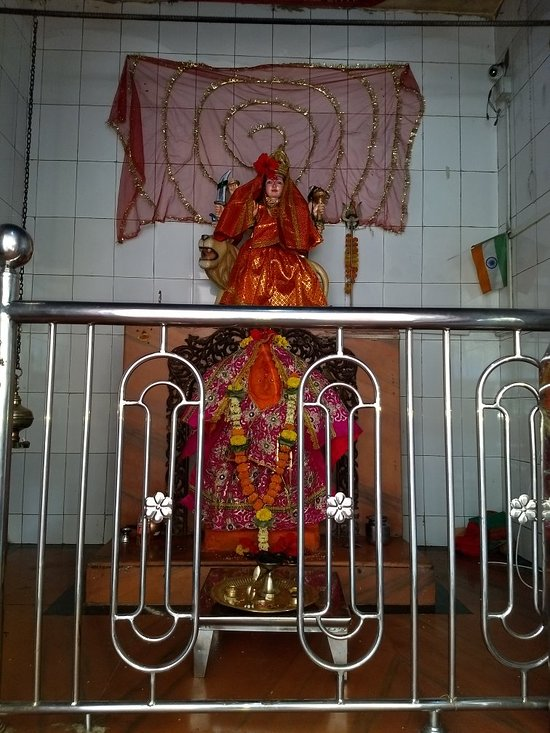
View of Mother Durga idols at Tungareshwar Temple

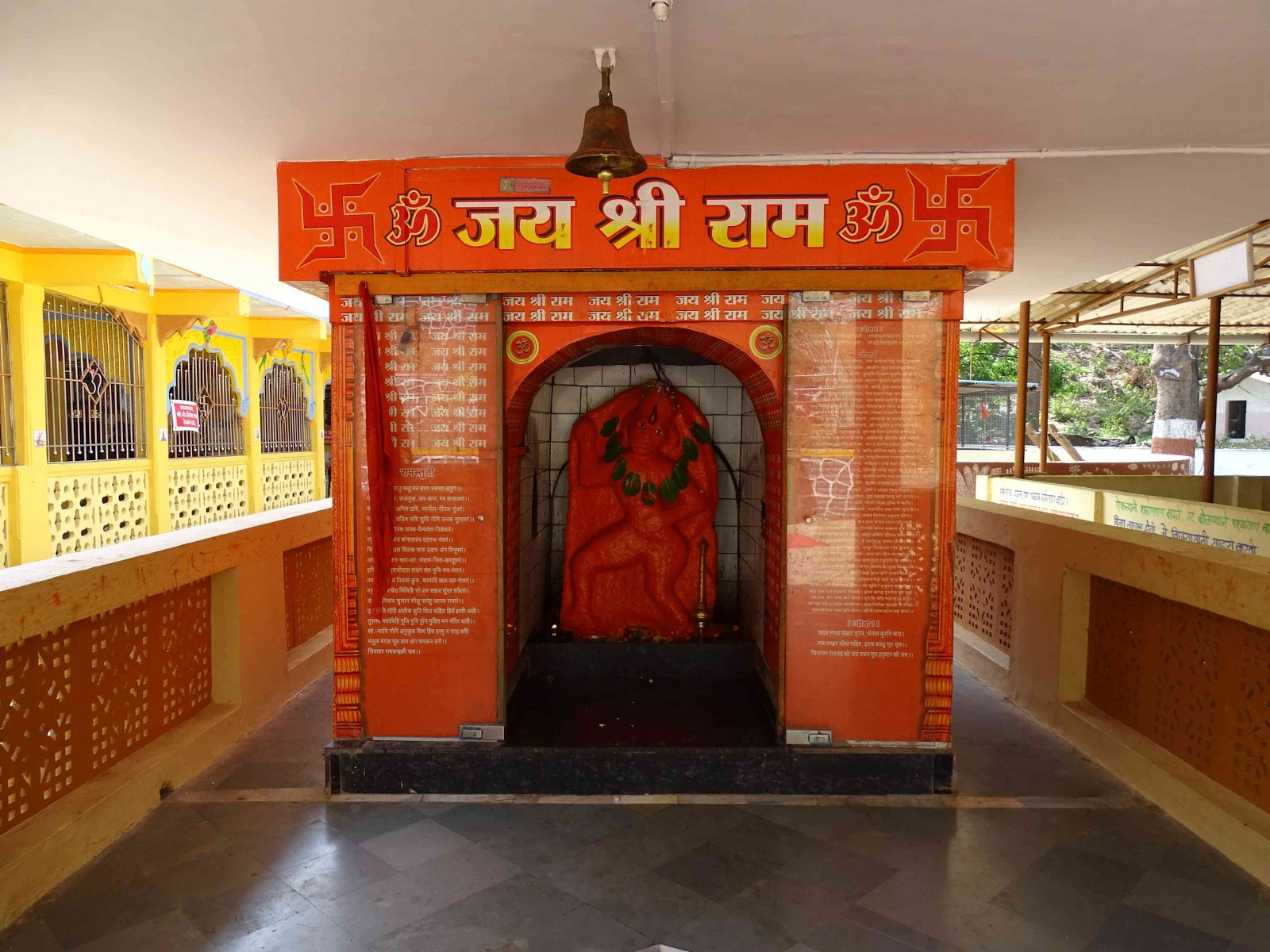
View of small Hanuman Temple at Tungareshwar Temple.

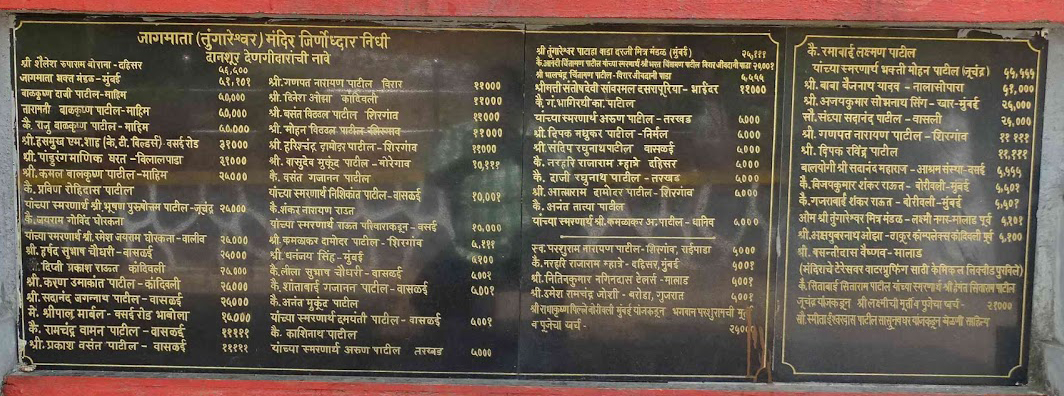
View of Information Board of Tungareshwar Temple.

== See also ==
- Jivdani Mata Temple
- Mumba Devi Temple
- Siddhivinayak Temple, Mumbai
- Mahalakshmi Temple, Mumbai
- Babulnath Temple
- Walkeshwar Temple
- Shri Swaminarayan Mandir, Mumbai
