= Thalassery Jagannatha Temple =

Jagannath Temple, Thalassery
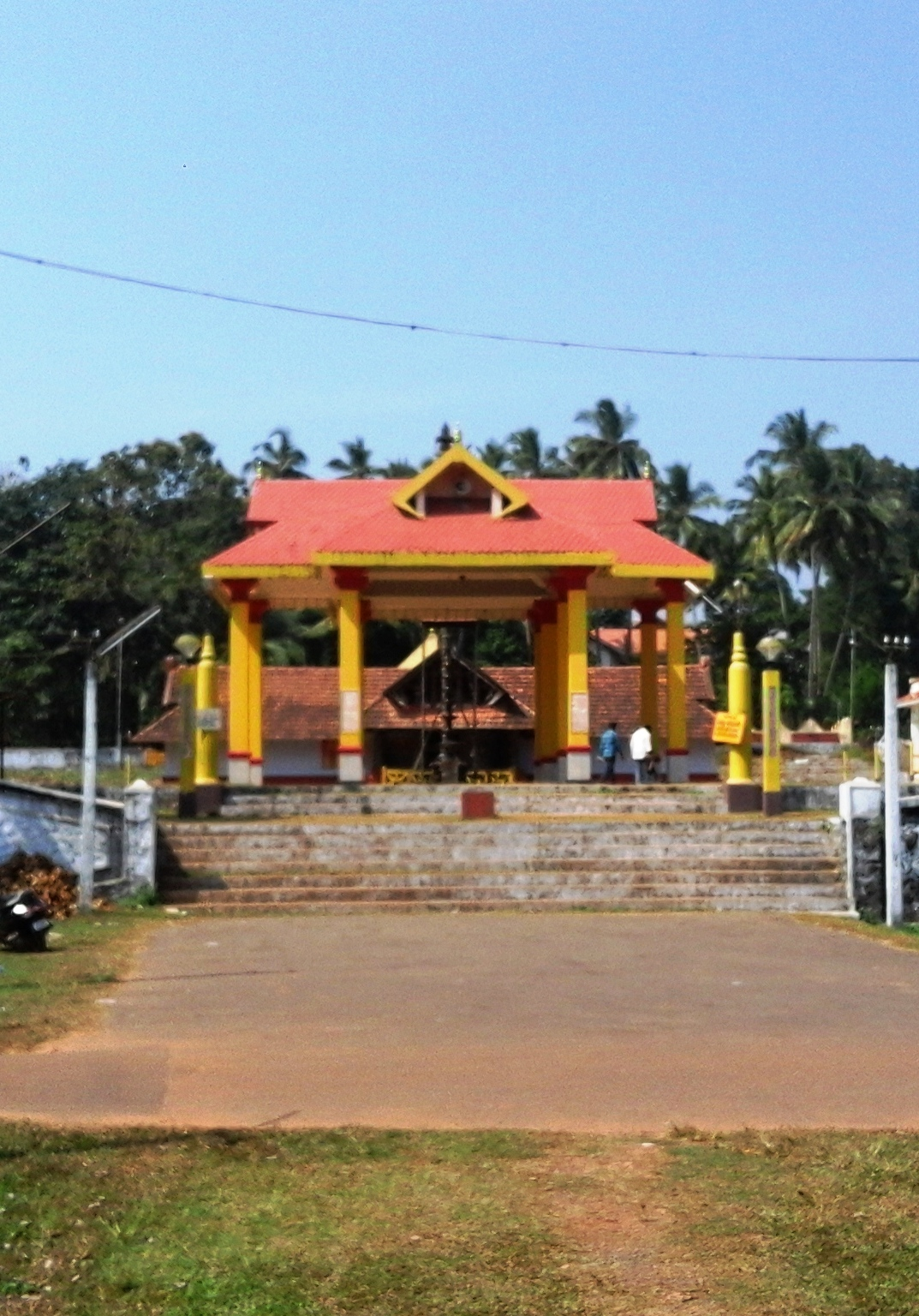

- Jagannath Temple, Thalassery, Kannur, Kerala

Religion
- Affiliation: Hinduism
- District: Kannur
- Deity: Shiva
- Festival: Maha Shivaratri

Location
- Location: Thalassery
- State: Kerala
- Country: India
- Interactive map of Jagannath Temple, Thalassery
- Coordinates: 11.736424°N 75.507911°E

Architecture
- Type: Architecture of Kerala

Specifications
- Temple: One
- Elevation: 33.36 m (109 ft)

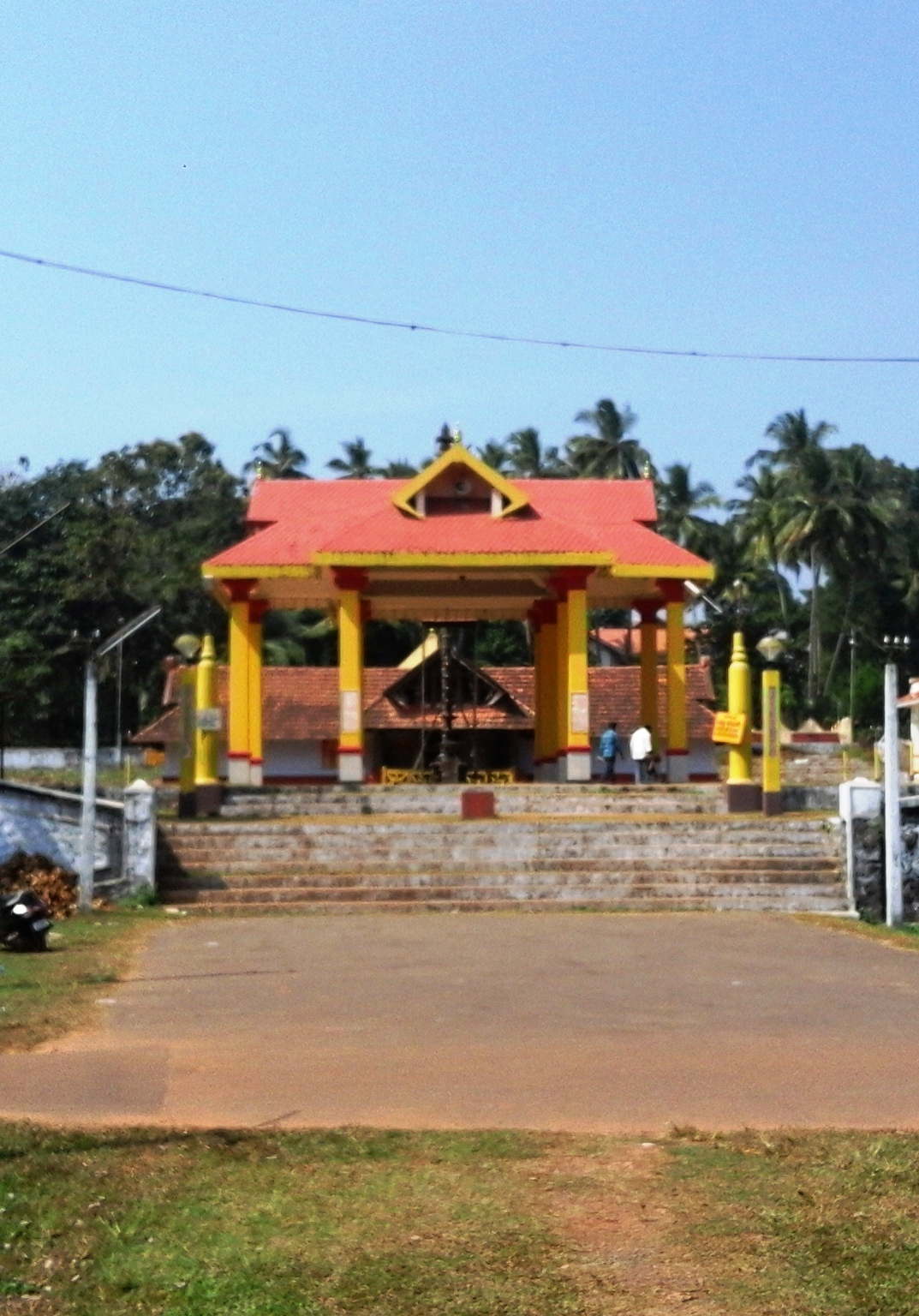
Thalassery Jagannath Temple, Kerala

Shree Jagannatha Temple is a major place of worship in Thalassery, Kannur District, Kerala province, India.

== Location ==
The temple is located near Jagannath Temple Gate Railway Station, about one kilometre from Thalassery city (Directions).

== History ==
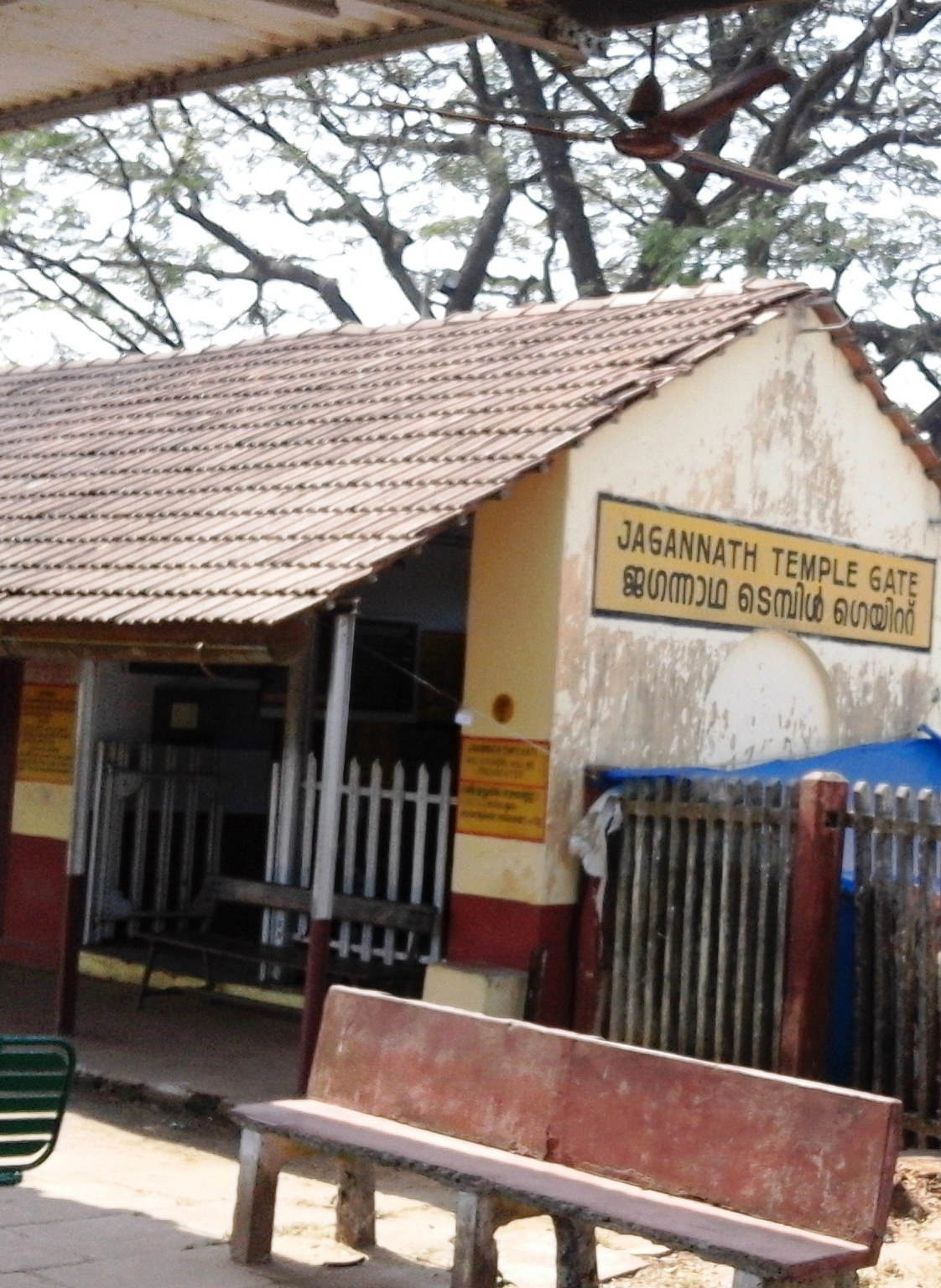
Jagannath Temple Gate Railway Station in Thalassery, Kerala

The temple was erected by Shri Narayana Guru in 1908. A statue of the guru was included in the temple complex in 1927. The Guru had a glimpse of his own statue at Colombo where it arrived on the way from Italy to India.it is a famous Temple. Varathoor Kaniyil Kunhikannan of Thalassery was the first to visit Sri Narayana Guru and invite him to Thalassery to establish a shrine. Guru initially said that the Thiyyars of Malabar did not need a temple, as they had their own system of worship. He also asked Varathoor Kaniyil Kunhikannan, "If I come and consecrate an idol, won’t people say that some random man from the south came, placed a stone, and left?" Kunhikannan replied that it would not be the case and convinced Sri Narayana Guru to visit Thalassery for the temple. This became the Sri Jagannath Temple.

== Image Gallery ==
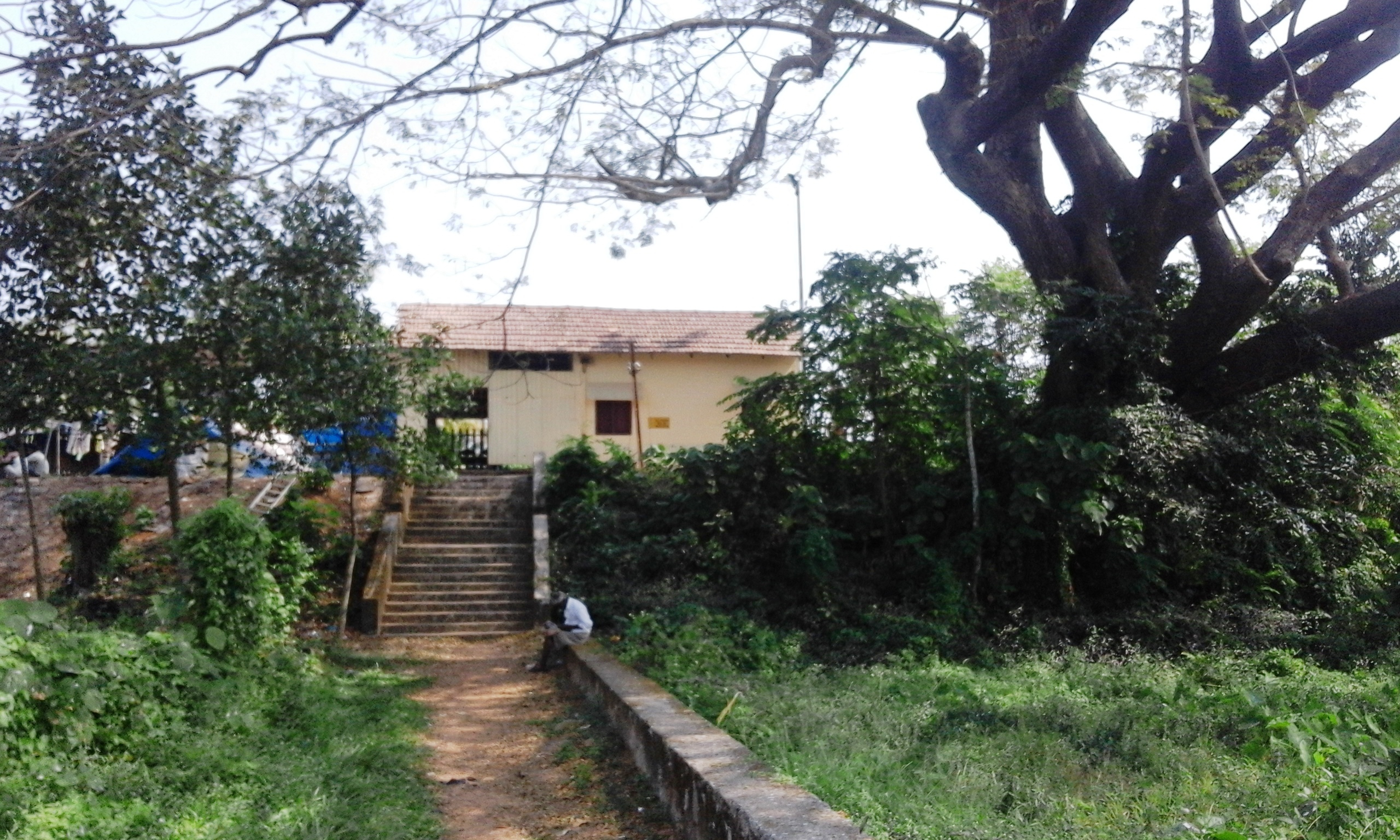
Railway Station

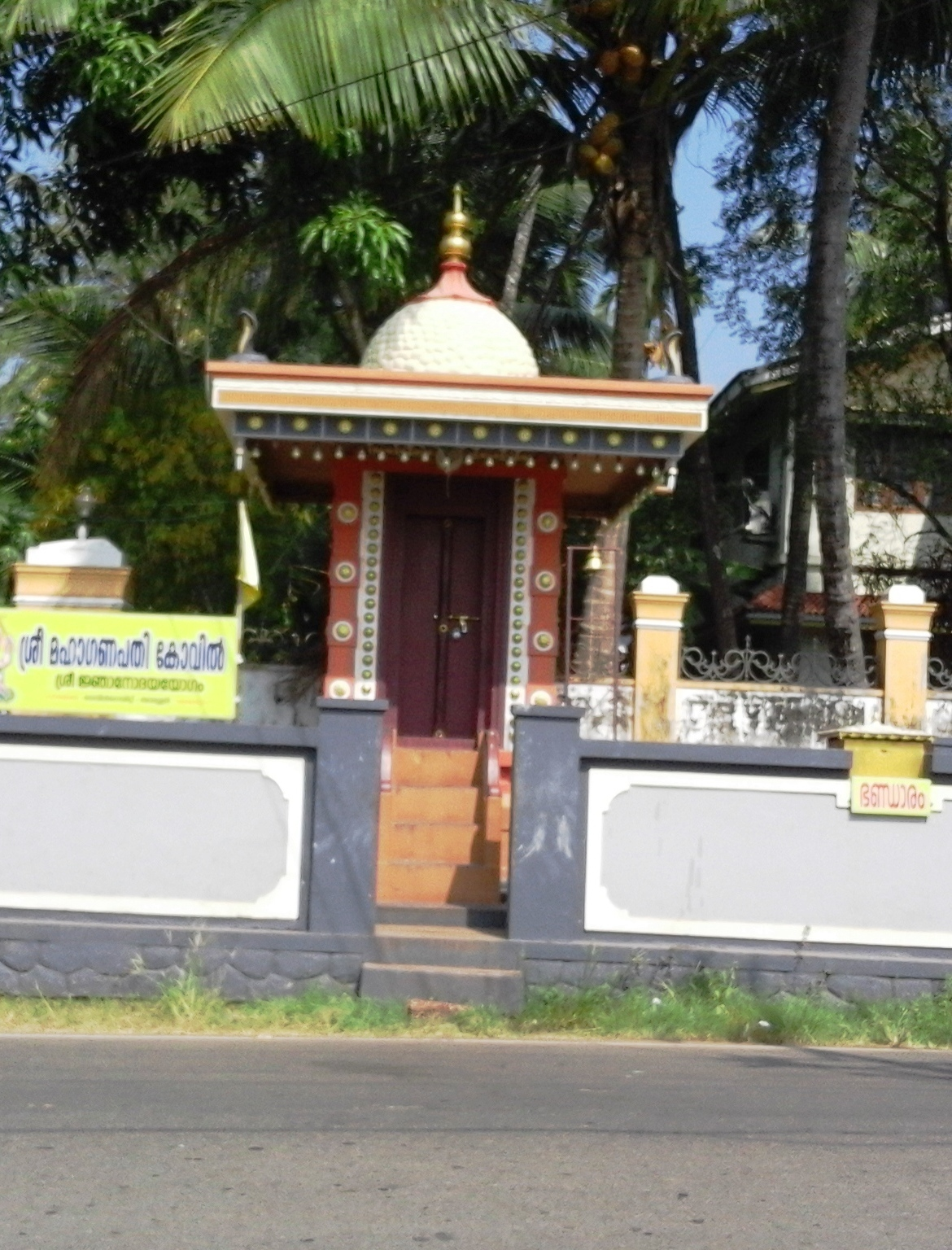
Ganapathy Kovil
