= Surutupalle =

- Village
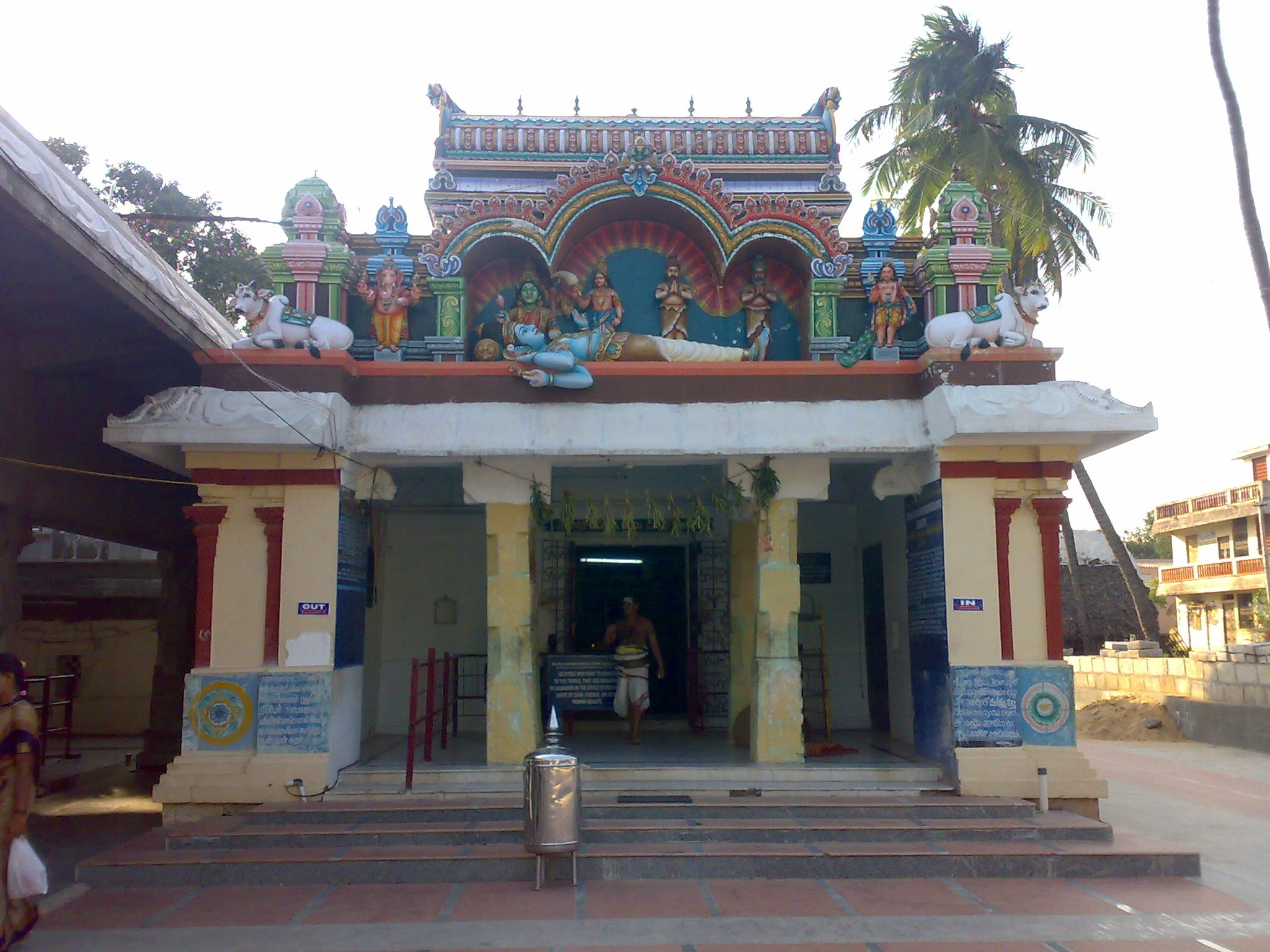
- Signboard of Angalakuduru village
- Interactive map of Surutupalle
- Location in Andhra Pradesh, India
- Coordinates: 13.3348°N 79.8746°E
- Country: India
- State: Andhra Pradesh
- District: Tirupati

Area
  - Total: 1.9 km^{2} (0.73 sq mi)

Population (2011)
  - Total: 517,589
  - Density: 270,000/km^{2} (710,000/sq mi)

Languages
  - Official: Telugu
- Time zone: UTC+5:30 (IST)
- Postal code: 522211

Surutapalle is a village in Tirupati district of the Indian state of Andhra Pradesh. It is located in Nagalapuram mandal of Srikalahasti revenue division.

== Tourism ==
Palli Kondeswara temple is a Hindu temple dedicated to the Shiva, located in Surutapalle. It is one of the religious tourist and pilgrim destination in the district. Lord Siva is in sleeping posture on the lap of Sarvamangala Devi (Parvati Devi) and such unique posture is nowhere else in the world.
