= Virundeeswarar Temple =

Hindu temple in Tamil Nadu, India

- Location in Tamil Nadu

Religion
- Affiliation: Hinduism
- District: Coimbatore
- Deity: Virundeeswarar (Shiva)

Location
- Location: K.Vadamadurai, Thudiyalur, Coimbatore.
- State: Tamil Nadu
- Country: India
- Interactive map of Virundeeswarar Temple
- Coordinates: 11°00′16″N 76°57′41″E

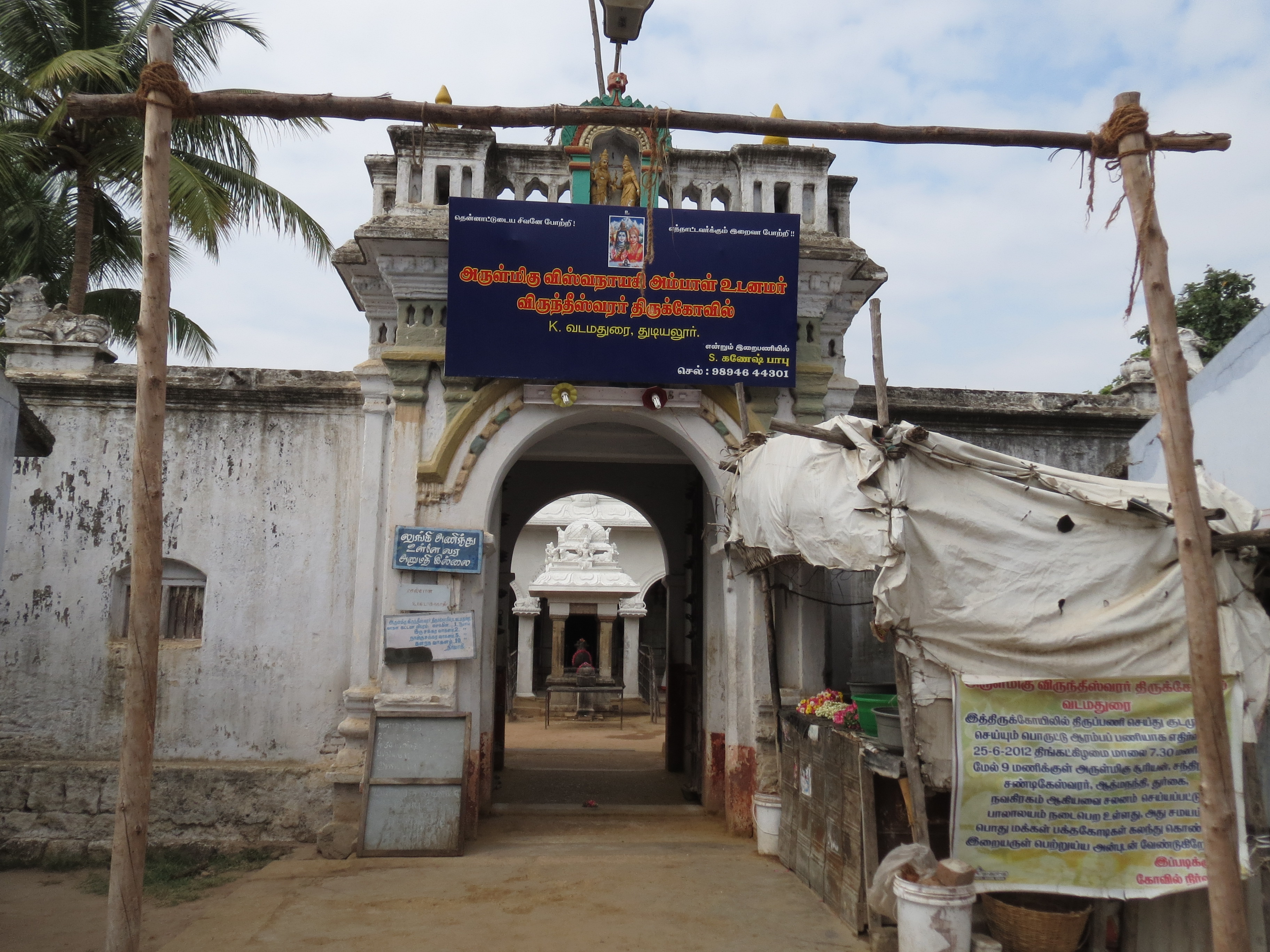

Thiruthudisaimpathy Virundeeswarar Temple ([விருந்தீஸ்வரர்) is located in Vadamadurai near Thudiyalur on Mettupalayam road in the State of Tamil Nadu. Earlier it was called Thiruthudisaimpathy, and later Thudiyalur. It is an ancient temple, more than 1300+ years old. It is one of the most important Siva Temples in Coimbatore. It is believed to have been constructed by Chozha kings in the 7th century.

The Lord Shiva is depicted as Swayambumurthy. Two Lingams are in the sanctorum- one (Swayambumurthy) is at the back and a small one is in the front. The temple faces East.

The temple is maintained and administered by the Hindu Religious and Charitable Endowments Department of Government of Tamil Nadu.

== History ==
As per Sthala Puranam, one Sundaramurthy Nayanar was travelling in this area. After having darshan at Avinashi, he was tired and hungry. He prayed to the Lord to rescue him. At that time, an elderly couple fed him food mainly made with drumstick leaves and fruits. When Sundarar's hunger was satisfied, he learned that the couple were Shri Parvathi and Parameswarar. As the Lord offered Virundhu (feast or food), he is called Virundeeswarar. He is the presiding deity of this temple together with his consort Parvati, who is known as Viswanayaki.

Lord Nataraja is generally depicted as dancing with long hair flying, however in this temple his hair is well dressed. Lord Shiva granted equal power to Nandhi at this temple, hence this Nandi is called Adhikara Nandi. The concept of Adhikara Nandi originated from this temple. The Adhikara Nandi concept in other temples came into existence after this temple.

This temple began celebrating Maha-Kumbhabhishekam on 11-July-2019.

== Events ==
- The Sun falls on Lord Virundeeswarar every 17th of Panguni.
- Maha Shivratri
- Pradosham
- Sankatahara Chaturthi
- Ganesh Chaturthi
- Thaipusam
- Kala Bhairavar Ashtami
- Arudhra Darisanam
- Hanuman Jayanti
