= Rameshwar Mahadev Temple =

Hindi temple in Bundi, Rajasthan

Religion
- Affiliation: Hinduism
- District: Bundi
- Deity: Shiva
- Festival: Maha Shivratri

Location
- State: Rajasthan
- Country: India

Rameshwar Mahadev Temple is a Hindu temple of Shiva which is located in Akoda, Bundi, Rajasthan, India. The temple is situated in the Aravalli mountain range near a large waterfall. This is a famous temple in the Hadoti region of Rajasthan, and devotees come to it from both Rajasthan and Madhya Pradesh.

== Temple ==
The temple is built like a cave. Within the temple is a five faced Shivling, which is claimed as self-manifested. There are 108 stairs in the temple. A large number of Dharamshalas have been built for the devotees visiting.

== Events ==
An annual fair is held at the temple between February and March, during the festival of Maha Shivaratri. Devotees gather in large numbers to have darshan of Shiva. In the month of Shravana, four to five thousand devotees come daily for darshan.

== See also ==
- Shiva
- Bundi
- Katt Bafla
