= Shri Kala Bhairava Nath Swami Temple =

Kala Bhairava Nath Swami Temple

Religion
- Affiliation: Hinduism
- District: Seoni district
- Deity: Lord Bhairava

Location
- Location: Adegaon
- State: Madhya Pradesh
- Country: India
- Interactive map of Kala Bhairava Nath Swami Temple

Shri Kala Bhairava Nath Swami Temple is one of the most famous Hindu temples dedicated to lord Bhairava. It is located in the ancient village of Adegaon in Seoni district in the state of Madhya Pradesh, India.
