= Jalantheeswarar Temple =

Shiva temple in Thakkolam, Tamil Nandu

Jalanatheeswarar Temple
- Thiruvooral
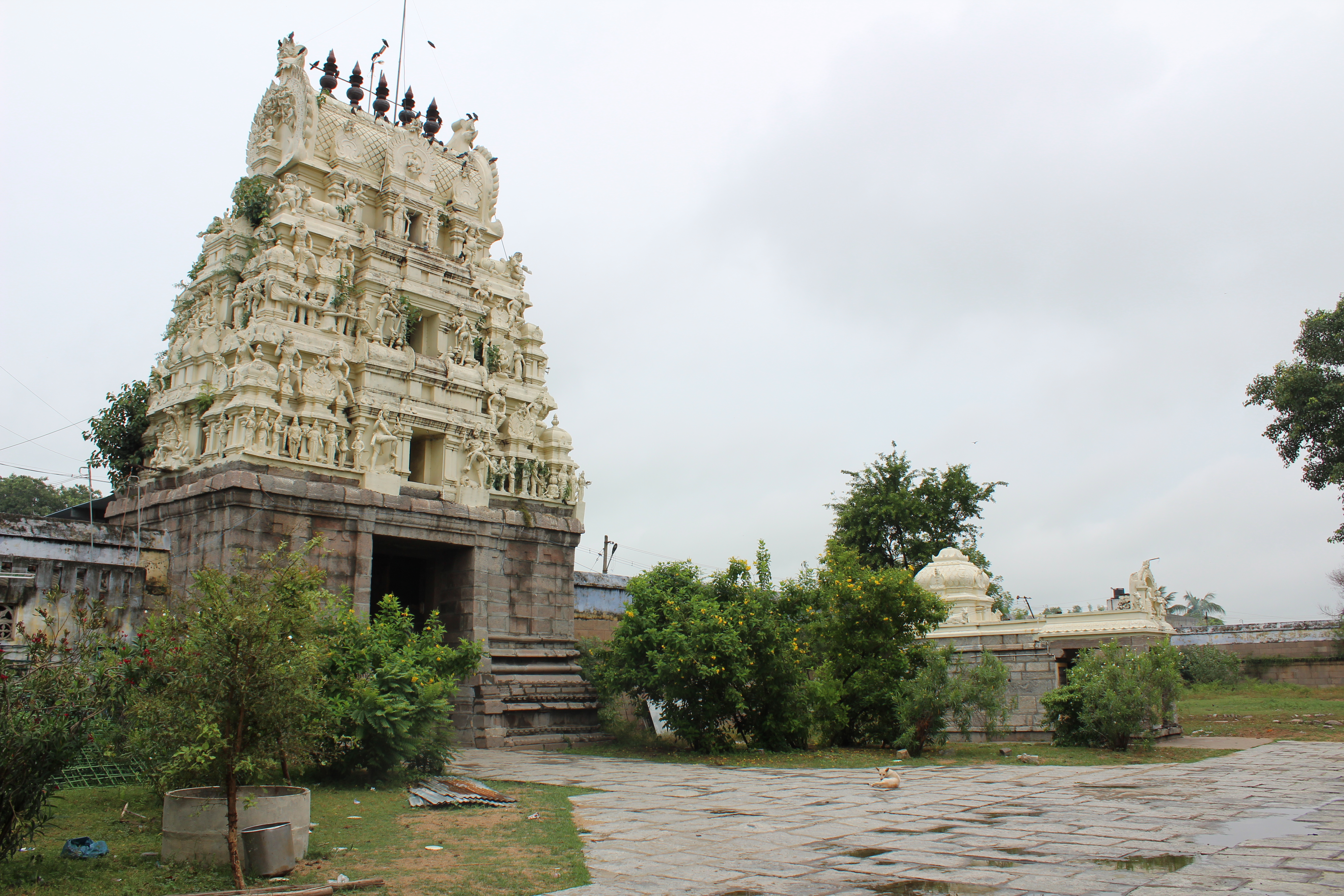

- Location in Tamil Nadu

Religion
- Affiliation: Hinduism
- District: Vellore
- Deity: Jalanatheeswarar(Shiva)

Location
- State: Tamil Nadu
- Country: India
- Coordinates: 13°00′57″N 79°44′13″E

Architecture
- Type: Dravidian architecture

Jalanatheeswarar Temple (also called Thiruvooral) is a Hindu temple dedicated to the deity Shiva in Thakkolam, a village in Vellore district in the Indian state of Tamil Nadu. Shiva is worshipped as Jalanatheeswarar and is represented by the lingam. His consort Parvati is depicted as Giriraja Kannikambal. The presiding deity is mentioned in the 7th-century Tamil Saiva canonical work, the Tevaram and is classified as Paadal Petra Sthalam.

The temple complex, which is entered through a three-tiered gopuram (main gateway), covers approximately one acre. The temple has a number of shrines, with those of Jalantheeswarar and his consort Giriraja Kannikambal being the most prominent. All the shrines are enclosed in large concentric rectangular granite walls..

The original complex is believed to have been built by the Pallavas, with later expansion from the Cholas; the masonry structure was built during the Nayak period in the 16th century. The temple is maintained and administered by the Hindu Religious and Charitable Endowments Department of the Government of Tamil Nadu.

== Legend ==
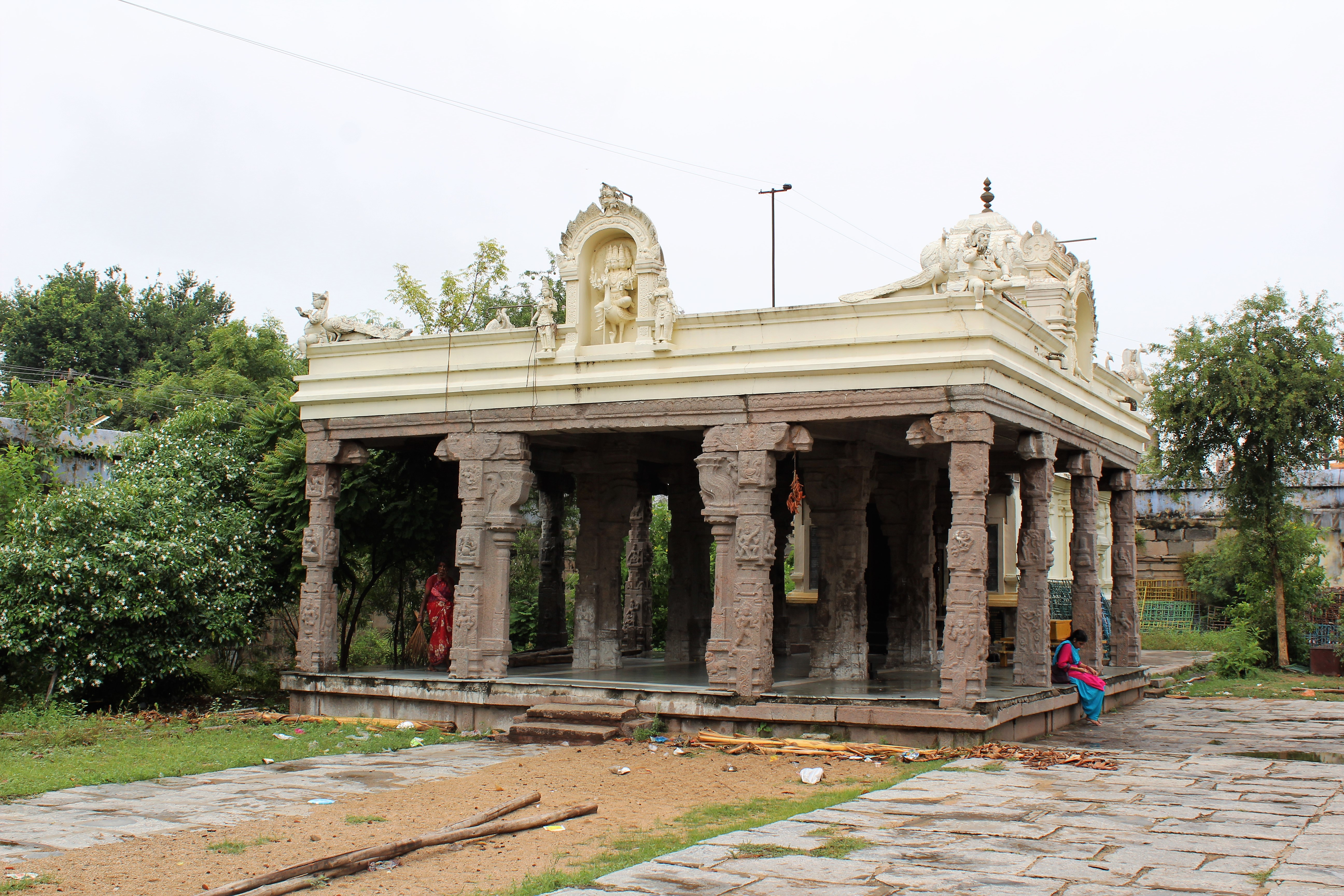
The gopuram of the temple

It is believed to be the place where Yama, the god of death, Saptamartrikas, the seven divine mothers, and sages Uthadi and Theerkatha worshipped Shiva.

== History ==
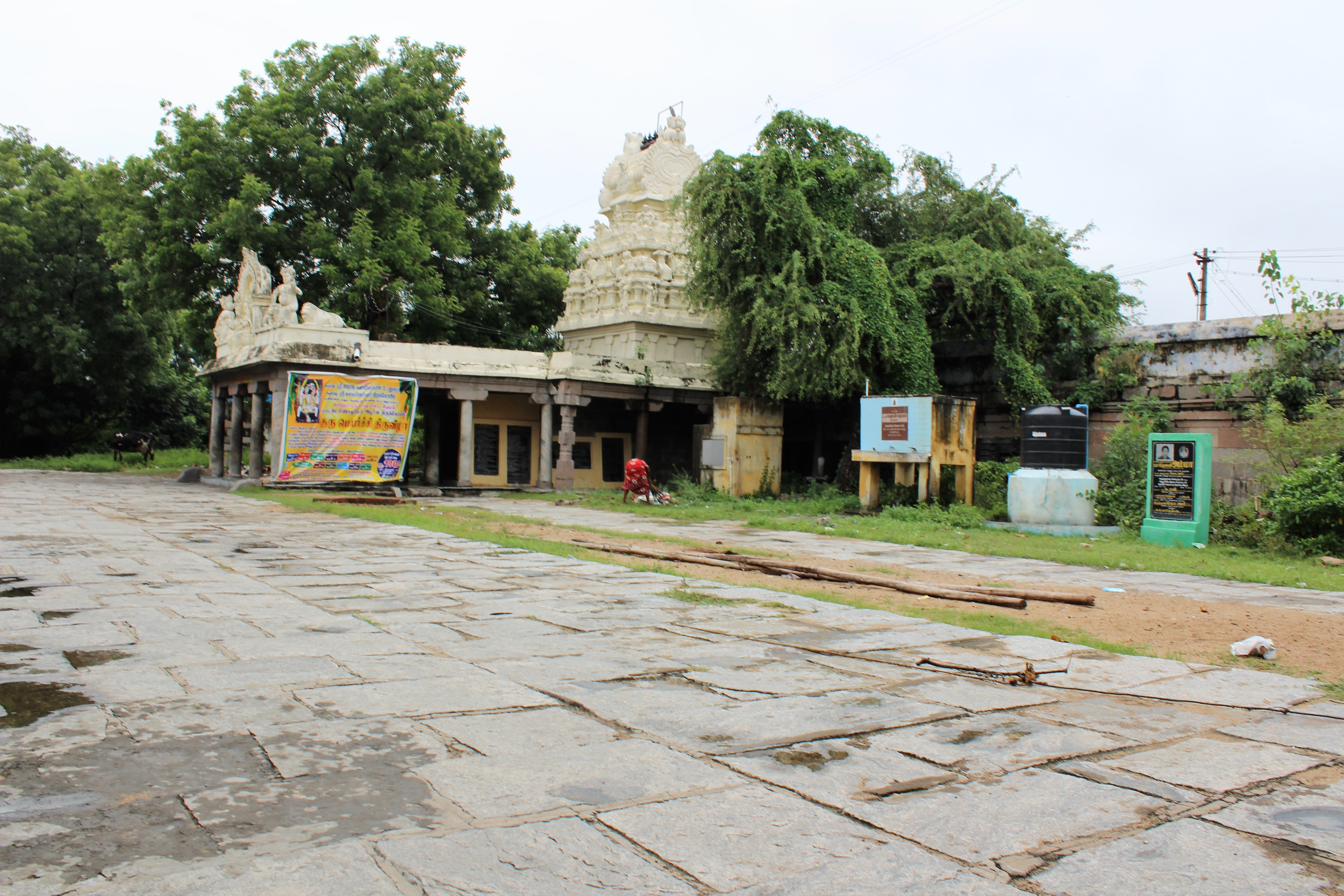
A shrine in the temple

The temple was originally believed to have been built by the Pallavas. Most of the Chola temples built between 866 and 1004 CE are associated with certain military events or political campaigns. Around 940 CE, Parantaka I had frequent trouble from invading Rashtrakutas. The Takkolam War, called the greatest war held in the Tamil region, was fought between the Cholas and Rashtrakutas. Parantaka's son Rajaditya was killed in the campaign, and Krishna III assumed the name "conqueror of Tanjai and Kanchi". The temple has four inscriptions dating to the 10th and 11th centuries identifying temple women engaged in the temple.

== Architecture ==
The temple has a three-tiered gateway tower, and all the shrines are enclosed in concentric rectangular granite walls. The temple occupies an area of around 1.5 acres (0.61 ha). The central shrine houses the image of Jalantheeswarar in the form of Lingam. The Lingam is made of sand, and sacred ablution is performed only on the Aavudayar. The shrine of Kiriraca Kannikar, Shiva's consort, faces west and is located in the Mahamandapam leading to the sanctum. The central shrine is approached through the flagstaff and Mahamandapam, both located axially to the gateway. The central shrine has an entrance towards the south and can be approached by circumambulating the shrine. The temple tank has a natural spring that fills through Nandi's shrine. Because water comes out of Nandi's mouth, it is called Pokkeswarar temple. As in other Shiva temples in Tamil Nadu, the shrines of Vinayaka, Murugan, Navagraha, Chandikesa, and Durga are located around the precinct of the main shrine.

The temple has a specimen of Thyagaraja, classified as Pre-Rajasimha style of Pallavas. Siva is depicted in a seated posture holding a rosary and an axe in the back left and right hands. Skanda is seen in a standing posture between Siva and Uma. The model in the temple is similar to the one at Thyagaraja Temple, Tiruvarur. The temple has Koshta Murthis (Niche sculptures) of Vishnu, Durga, Brahma, Dakshinamurthi, Ganesha, and Durga from the Pallava period, which are found in the walls of the main shrine.

== Religious importance ==
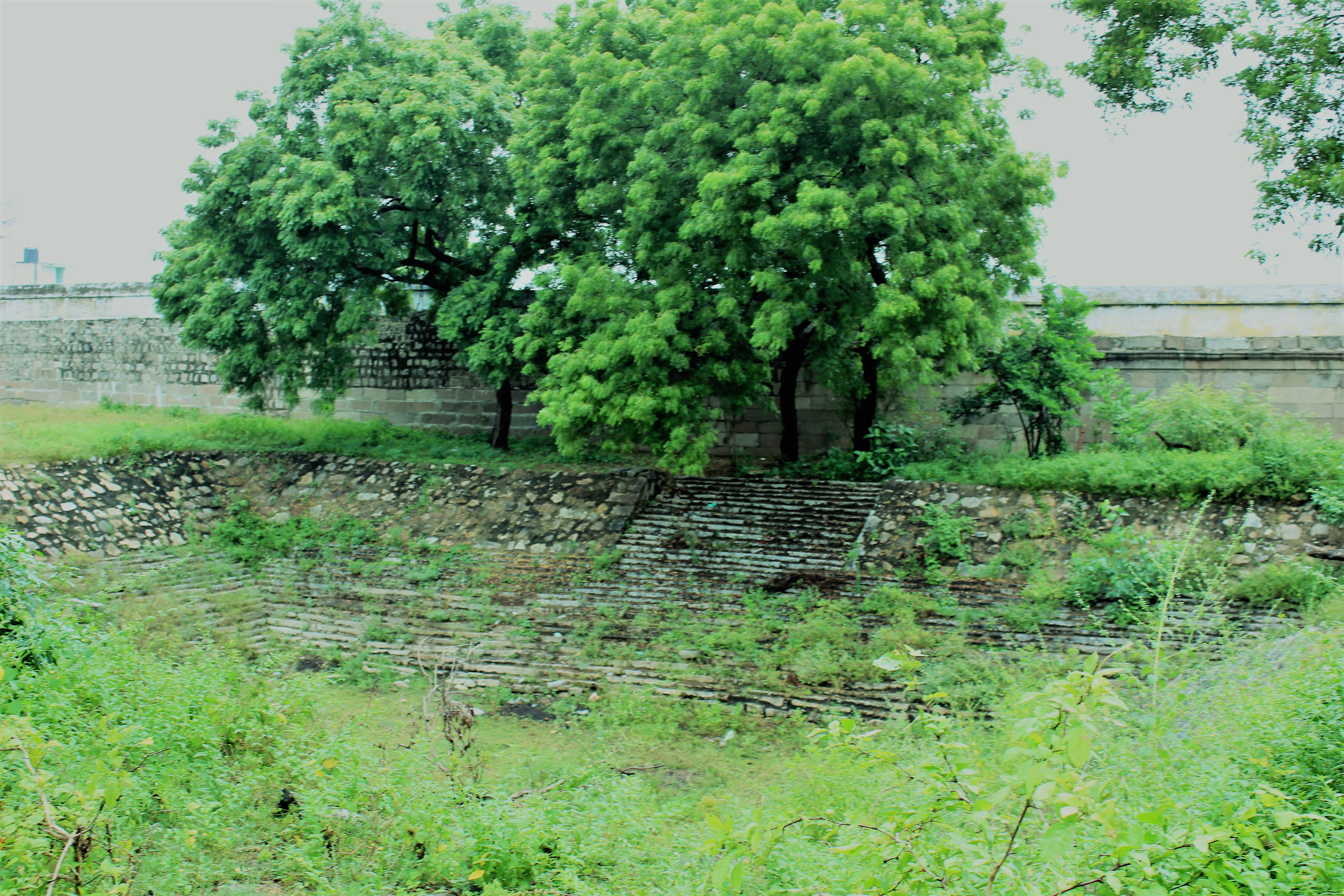
The natural springs in the western side of the temple

It is one of the shrines of the 275 Paadal Petra Sthalams - Shiva Sthalams glorified in the early medieval Tevaram poems by Tamil Saivite Nayanars Sambandar. Periyapuranam, the treatise about 63 Nayanmars of Shaivites, gives an account of the temple. The Sthalapuranam of the temple, Orriyur Puranam refers to the Nandi of the temple.
