= Adegaon =

- Village
- Location in Madhya Pradesh, India Adegaon (India)
- Coordinates: 22°37′N 79°29′E
- Country: India
- State: Madhya Pradesh
- District: Seoni
- Elevation: 2,066 m (6,778 ft)
- Time zone: UTC+5:30 (IST)

Adegaon is a village and a Gram Panchayat in the Seoni district in the Indian state of Madhya Pradesh. It is known for its Shri Kala Bhairava Nath Swami Temple.
