= Byaspur Shiva Temple =

Hindu temple in West Bengal, India

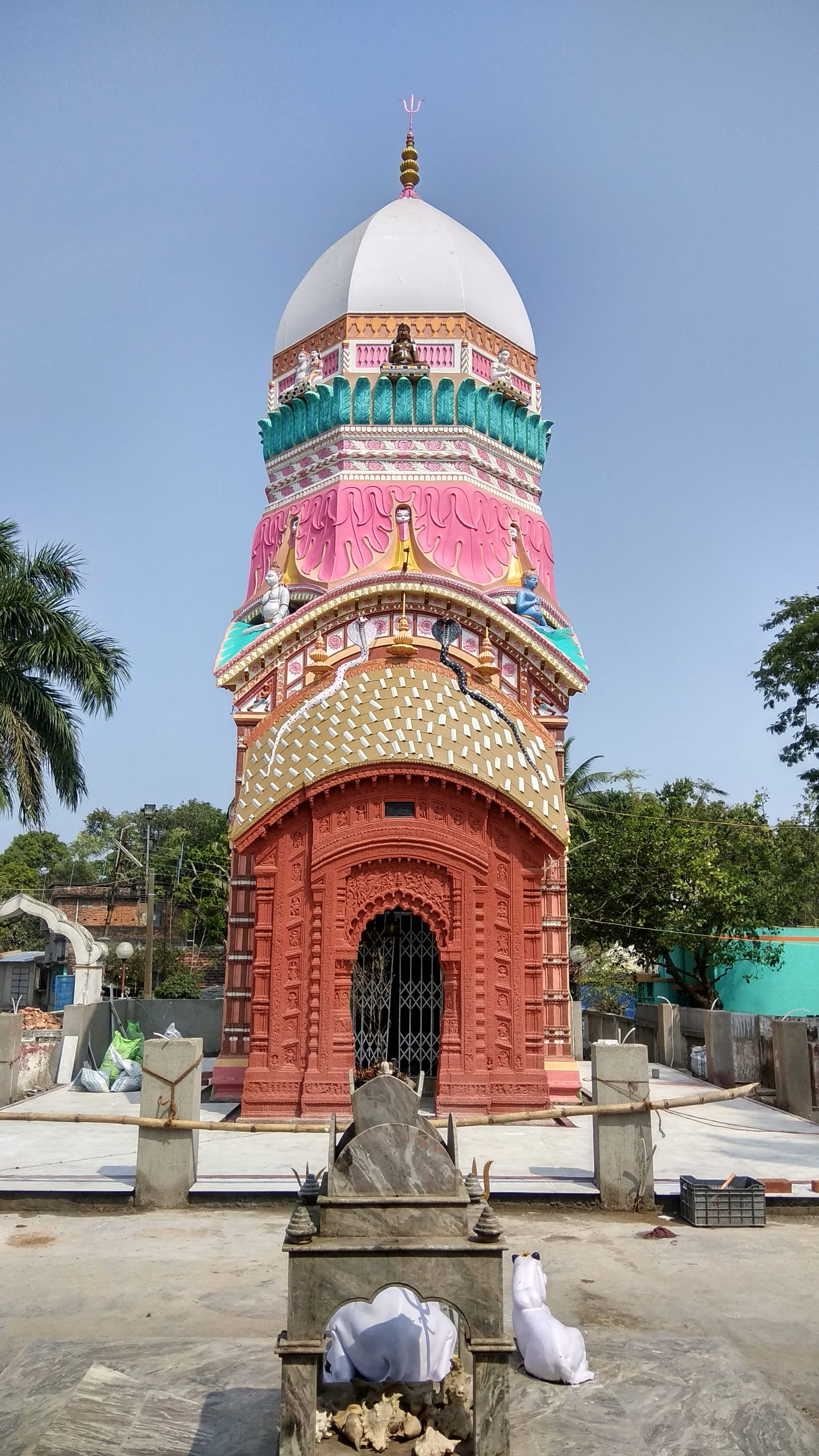

Religion
- Affiliation: Hinduism
- District: Murshidabad
- Deity: Byasa Dev (Shiva)
- Festival: Maha Shivaratri

Location
- Location: Byaspur, Kashimbazar
- State: West Bengal
- Country: India

Architecture
- Creator: Pandit Ramkeshava Devasharman
- Established: 1811 1918 (renovated) 1995 (renovated)

Byaspur Shiva Temple (Bengali: ব্যাসপুর শিব মন্দির) is a famous Shiva temple located at Byaspur in Kashimbazar, Murshidabad district. The worshiped in this temple is Byasa Dev, a form of Shiva – one of Hinduism's trinity of supreme divinity. The temple was built in 1811, and renovated in 1918 and 1995.

The temple is sacred to the Shaiva tradition of Hindus.

== History ==
The temple was built in 1811 by Pandit Ramkeshava Devasharman. Many say the temple was inspired by the Baranagar temple built by Rani Bhabani, the queen of Natore. However, the temple gradually fell into disrepair due to lack of maintenance. The Rai Bahadur of Lalgola, Maharaja Jogindranarayan Roy renovated this temple in 1918. At that time, lawyer and nationalist leader Rai Bahadur Baikuntha Nath Sen was supervising the renovation of this temple. Then again this temple was renovated in 1995. That reform was led by Amitkumar Bhosle from Maharashtra.

== Deity ==
The Garbhagriha (sanctum) of the temple has a Shiva linga made of Touchstone.. The Shiva linga is known as byasa Dev to devotees. The height of this Shiv linga is 5 feet.

== Description ==
=== Temple architecture ===
The temple is made up of a mixture of different architectural styles. The temple has a chala with a cornice, eight petals of a lotus flower, an eight-cornered pinnacle in the temple. At the top of the temple there are three kalas and a trishul, the kalas look like upside down lotuses.

In front of the main temple is the huge "Nat Mandir". The "Nat Mandir" serves as a waiting place for devotees before the puja. There is a huge idol of "Hargauri" (Shiva-Parvati) next to the entrance of the temple.

=== Terracotta ===
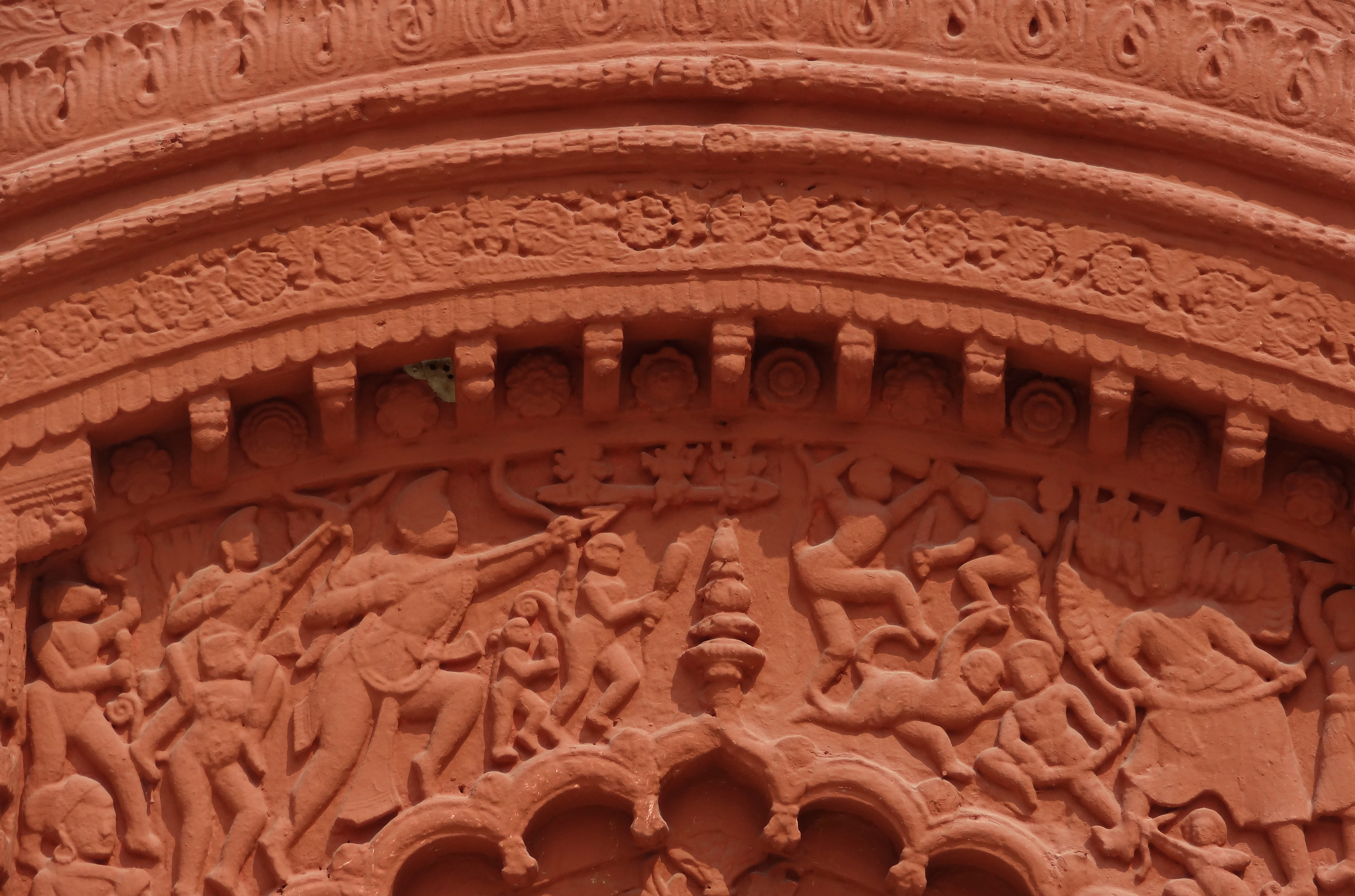
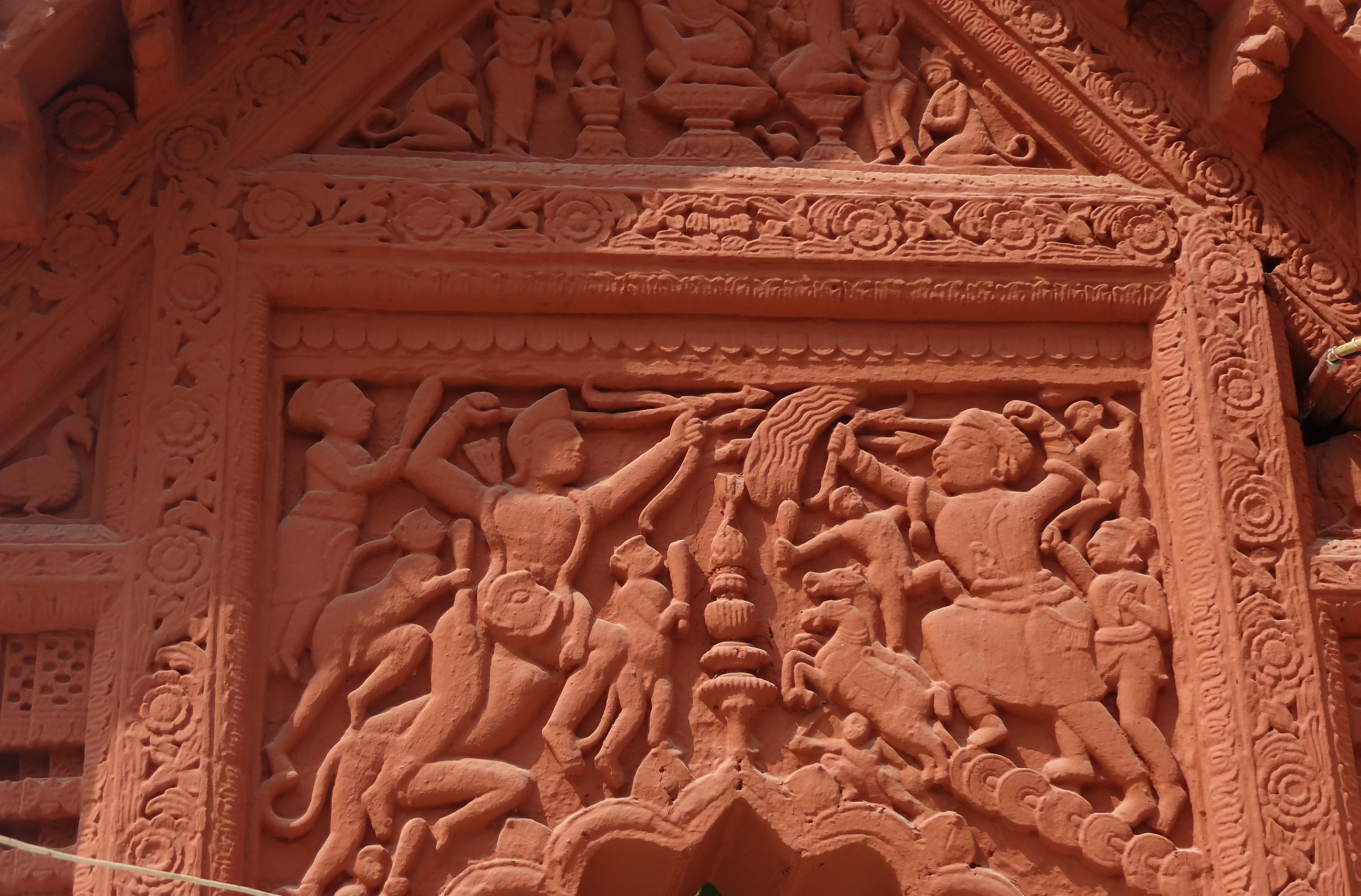
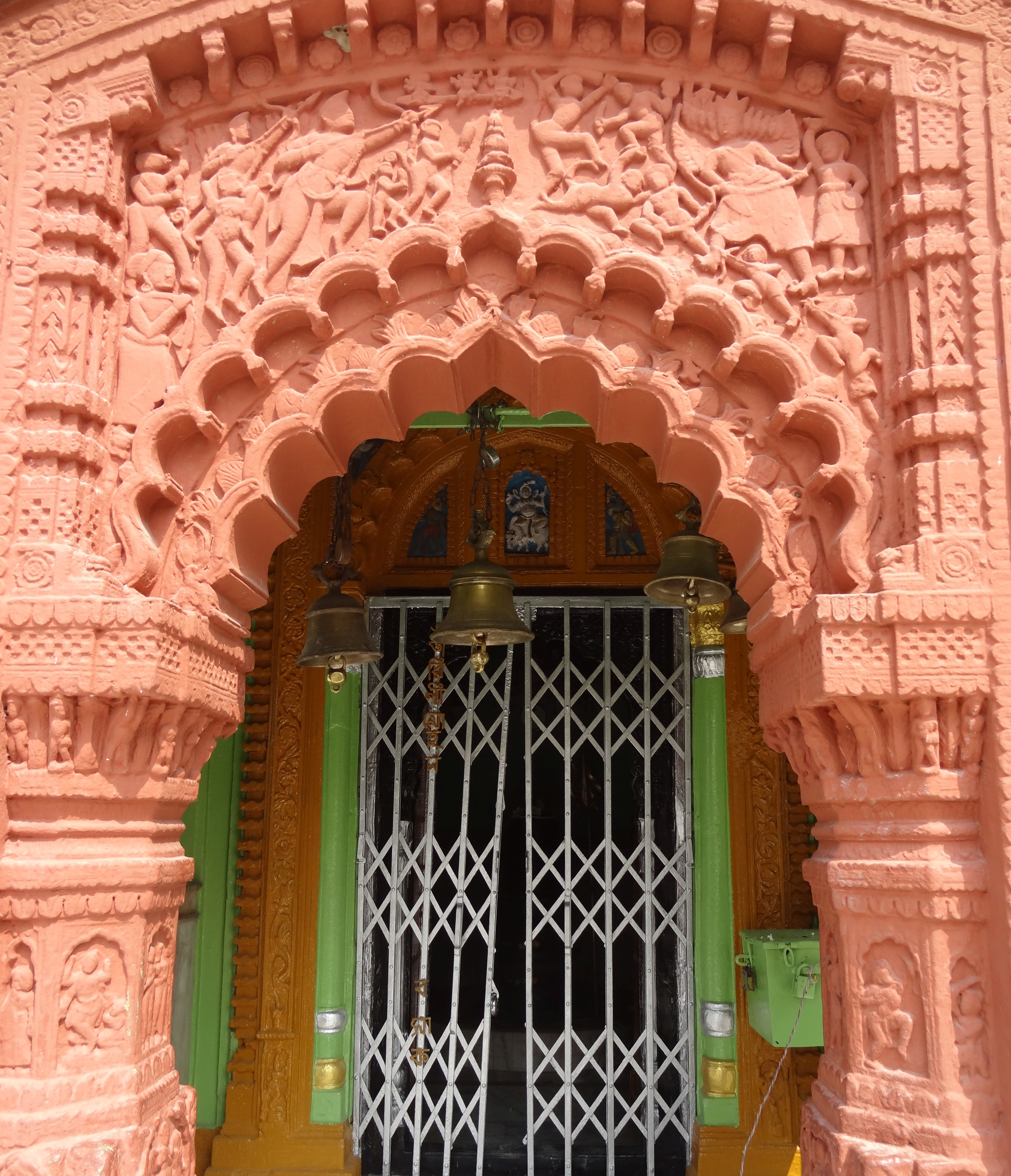
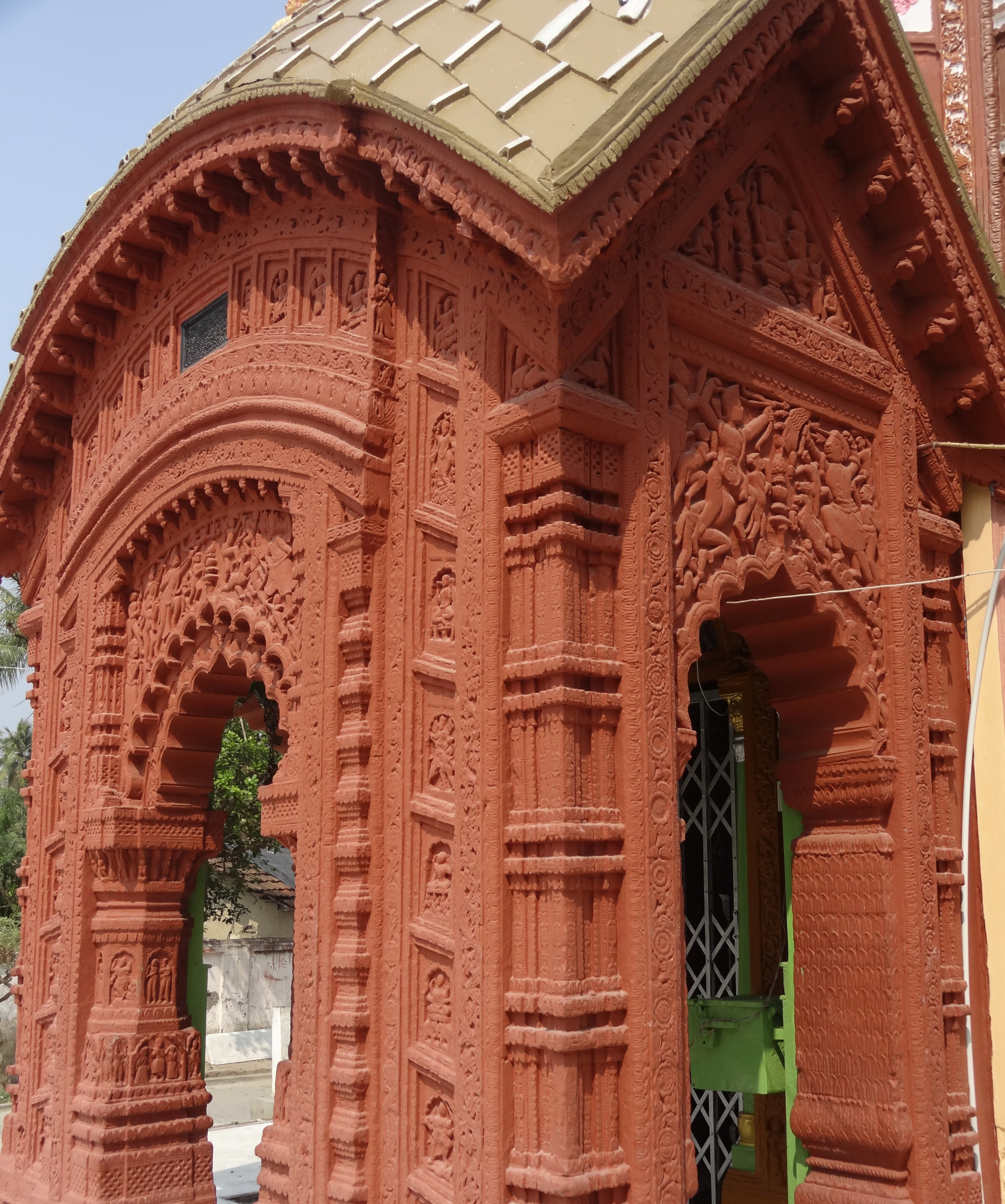

Durga, Kali, Radhamadhav, Ganesha, lion, elephant, snake etc. are painted on the temple. At the entrance of the temple, the battle of Rama-Ravana, Krishna Leela, Vishnu Dashavatar, Mahishasura Mardini, flowers and foliage are painted on the temple. Some of the terracotta has been damaged due to temple renovations.

=== Worship, festivals and fairs ===
Devotees worship Baba byasa Dev or Baba byaseshwar daily. Puja is performed twice daily in the temple. Aarti and Kirtan are performed in the temple in the evening. A 7-day fair is held in the temple on Shivaratri.
