= Pallikondeswara Temple, Surutupalle =

Hindu temple in India

Pallikondeswara Temple
- పళ్ళికొండేశ్వరా దేవస్థానం
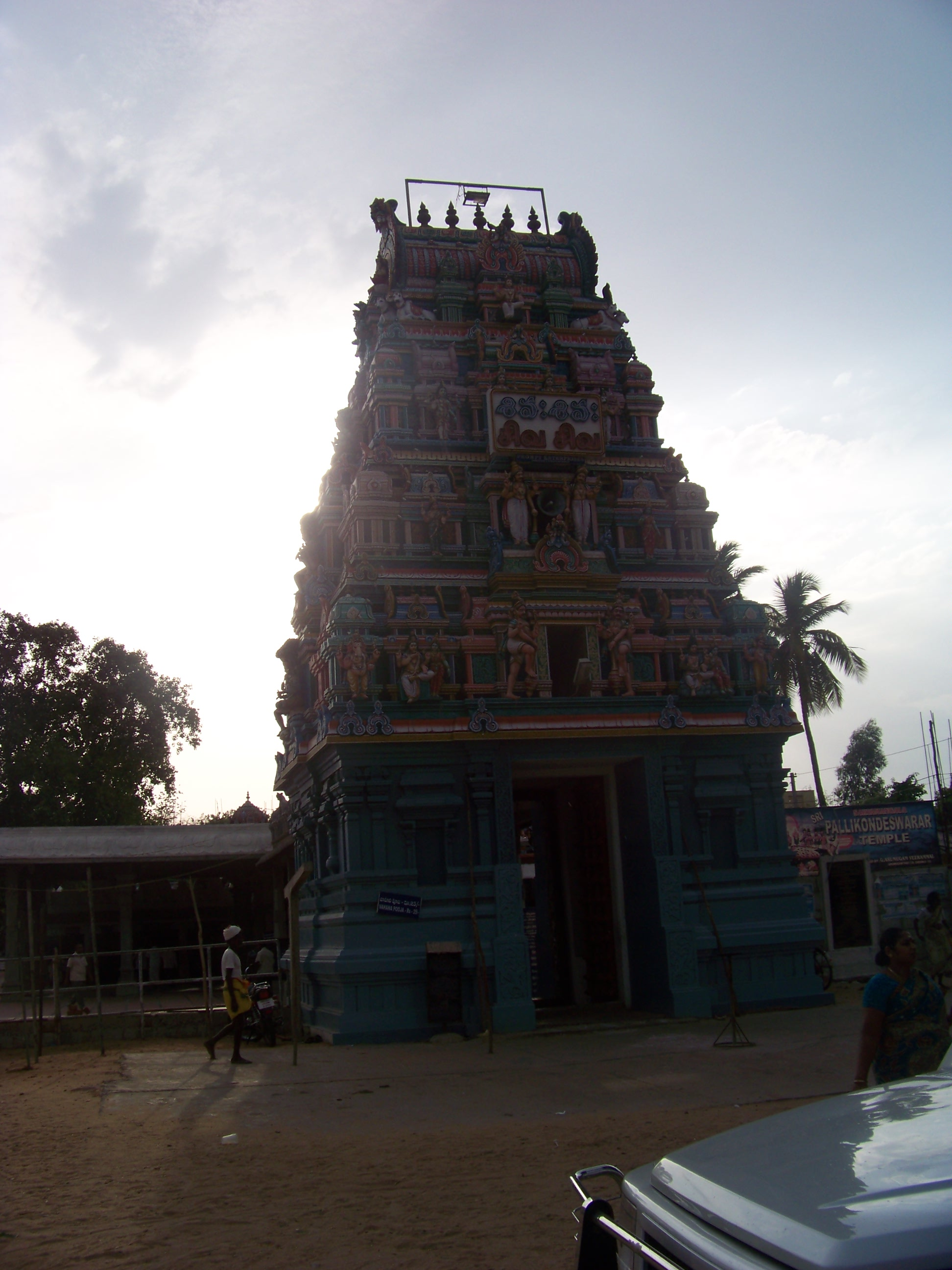

Religion
- Affiliation: Hinduism
- District: Tirupati district
- Deity: Pallikondeswara (Shiva)

Location
- Location: Surutupalle
- State: Andhra Pradesh
- Country: India
- Interactive map of Pallikondeswara Temple
- Coordinates: 13°9′N 80°18′E

Architecture
- Type: Dravidian architecture

Pallikondeswara Temple (also Pradosha kshetram) is a Hindu temple dedicated to Shiva in Surutupalle, a village in Tirupati district of Andhra Pradesh, India. The presiding deity Pallikondeswara, unlike other Shiva temples, is lying on the lap of his consort Parvati.

The temple house a three-tiered gateway tower known as gopurams. The temple has numerous shrines, with those of Valmeegeeswarar and Maragathambigai being the most prominent. The temple was built by Vijayanagara king Harihara Bukka Raya (1344–47). In modern times, the temple is maintained and administered by State Institute of Temple Administration (SITA) of the Government of Andhra Pradesh.

== Legend ==
During the Samudra manthan (churning of the ocean of milk) by the gods and demons, many treasures along with the Amrita (elixir of the gods) and the poison Halahala rose from the ocean. To rescue the beings of the world from the poison, Shiva consumed it. When the poison was just going down the throat of Shiva, his consort Parvati stopped it there by tightly holding Shiva’s throat, turning Shiva's neck blue. After the episode, Shiva proceeded to his abode Kailash with Parvati. On the way, he felt exhausted and slightly uncomfortable, when he reached a place in the bounds of Andhra, which came to be called Suruttappalli. There, he lay down to relax, keeping his head in the lap of Parvati. The gods, who were concerned about Shiva's well-being, assembled there and stood around him, waiting for the Lord to open his eyes. This lying posture of Shiva is rare and unique, almost similar to Vishnu’s reclining posture.

== Architecture ==
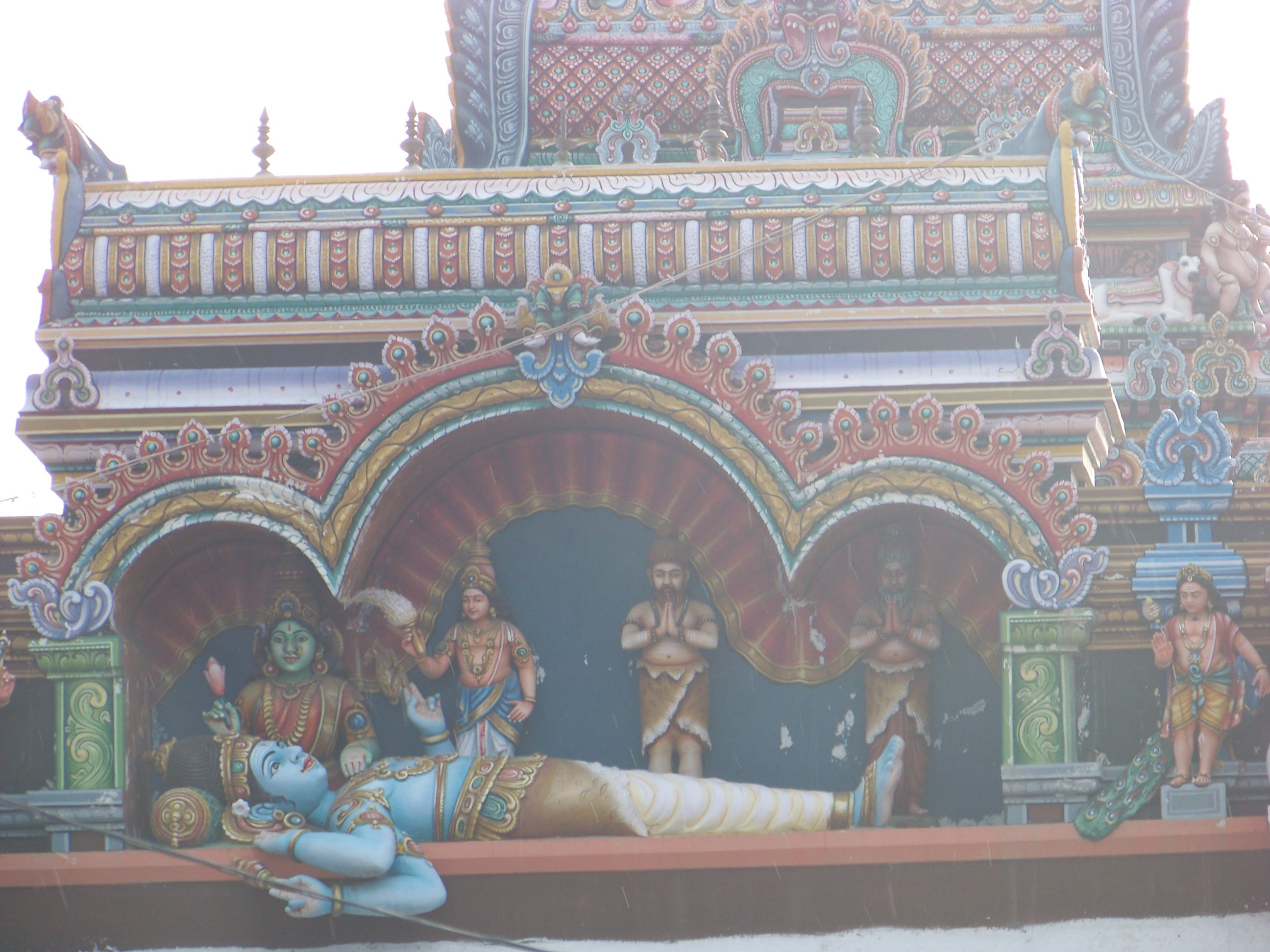
A temple sculpture depicting the central icon

The temple was built by Vijayanagara king Harihara Bukka Raya (1344–47). The temple has an inscription stating the temple was renovated by Kalahasti princess in 1833. Sri Chandrashekarendra Saraswati of Kanchi Mutt camped here for 40 days in 1976, he showed a place and asked people to dig it, when they did, they found the stone and Mahaperiyava disclosed that the footprints are those of Rama's twins Lava and Kusha. Sri Jayendra Saraswati and Sri Vijayendra Saraswati performed the Kumbabhishekam of the temple on June 23, 2002. In modern times, the temple is maintained and administered by State Institute of Temple Administration (SITA) of the Government of Andhra Pradesh. Palli Kondeswarar translates to reclining deity. Shiva as Palli Kondeswarar is seen in a reclining posture in the lap of his consort Parvati as Sarva Mangalambika, which is typical of Ranganatha form of the god Vishnu. The temple was built during the late Vijayanagara period and the deity here is termed as Bhoga sayana Siva. The temple house a three-tiered gateway tower known as gopurams. This icon of Shiva is unusual; most Shiva temples contain a Lingam, his aniconic symbol, as the central icon. The gods Ganesha, Kartikeya, Surya, Chandra, Indra and sages such as Narada are seen standing around Shiva.

The temple has many icons, besides the central icon for Brahma, Vishnu, Chandra, Kubera, Surya, Indra, Ganesha, Kartikeya with consorts Valli and Devayanai. There are icons for sages Bhrigu, Markandeya, Narada, Agastya, Pulastya, Gautama, Tumburu, Vashista, Viswamitra and Valmiki. Adishankara, another form of Shiva, in a separate niche. There are shrines for Navagraha, the nine planetary deities and Sanganidhi and Padumanidhi with their consorts Vasundara and Vasumadhi respectively.
