= Pichatur =

- Village
- Interactive map of Pichatur
- Location in Andhra Pradesh, India
- Coordinates: 13°24′03″N 79°44′28″E
- Country: India
- State: Andhra Pradesh
- District: Tirupati
- Mandal: Pitchatur

Languages
  - Official: Telugu
  - Regional: Telugu, Tamil
- Time zone: UTC+5:30 (IST)
- PIN: 517587
- Telephone code: 08576
- Vehicle registration: AP

Pichatur is a village in Tirupati district of the Indian state of Andhra Pradesh. It is the mandal headquarters of Pitchatur mandal.
