= Babulnath Temple =

Hindu temple in Mumbai, India

Coordinates: 18.95869°N 72.80860°E

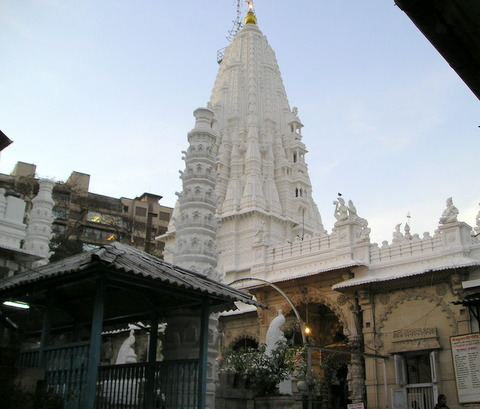

- Location in Mumbai, Maharashtra

Religion
- Affiliation: Hinduism
- District: Mumbai City district
- Deity: Shiva
- Festivals: Mahashivaratri, Diwali

Location
- Location: Mumbai
- State: Maharashtra
- Country: India
- Interactive map of Babulnath Temple

Website
- www.babulnathmandir.org

Babulnath Temple is a Hindu temple, dedicated to Shiva, in Mumbai, India, on a small hillock near Girgaum Chowpatty. It is one of oldest mandirs in the city, Shiva in the form of the "Lord of the Babul Tree" is the main deity in this temple.
