= Agam Kuan =

- Archaeological site
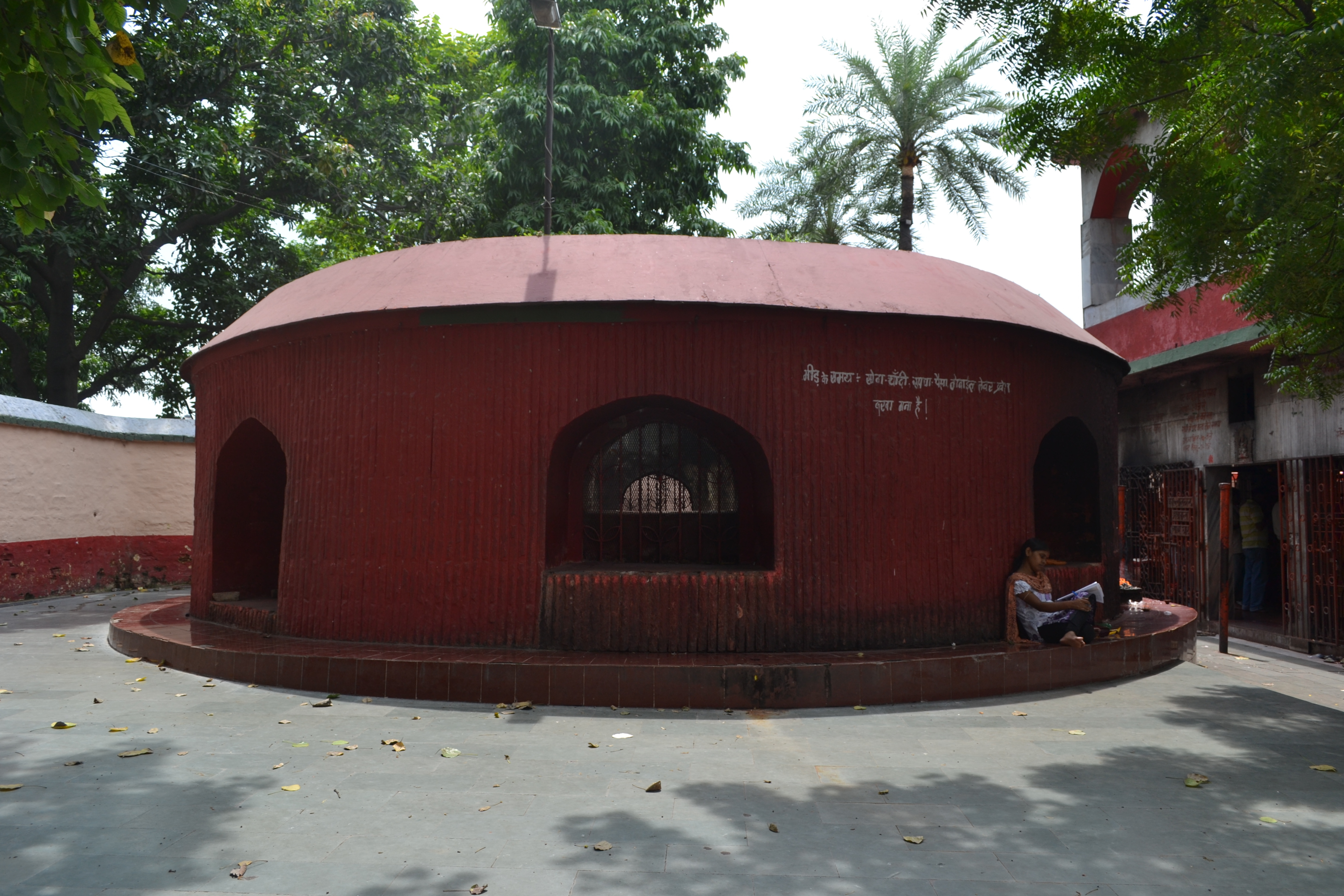
- Agam Kuan

- Location of Agam Kuan Agam Kuan (India)
- Coordinates: 25°35′53″N 85°11′48″E
- Country: India
- State: Bihar
- Metro: Patna

Government
  - Body: Patna Municipal Corporation

Languages
  - Official: Hindi
- Time zone: UTC+5:30 (IST)
- PIN: 800007

Agam Kuan ("unfathomable well") is an ancient well and archaeological site in Patna, Bihar, India. It is said to date back to the period of Mauryan emperor, Ashoka (304–232 BCE). It is circular in shape, lined with brick in the upper 13 metres (43 ft) and wooden rings in the remaining 19 metres (62 ft).

The Agam Kuan is set within an archaeological site identified by the Archaeological Survey of India which also contains the adjacent Shitala Devi temple where the Shakti deity Shitala Devi is venerated. Inside this temple, the pindas of the Saptamatrikas (the seven mother goddesses) are worshipped. The temple is widely revered for its belief in curing smallpox and chicken pox.

== Location ==
Agam Kuan is situated close to the Gulzarbagh railway station, on the way to Panch Pahadi, on the outskirts of Patna, Bihar state. It is east of Patna and south-west of Gulzarbagh Station. India

== According to the legend ==
During the 1890s, the British explorer, Laurence Waddell, while exploring the ruins of Pataliputra, identified Agam Kuan as the legendary well built by Ashoka for the purpose of torture before he embraced Buddhism, as part of Ashoka's Hell chambers. The torture practice was also reported by Chinese travellers (most probably Fa Hien) of the 5th and 7th centuries A.D. The well is stated to have been used to torture convicts by throwing them into the fire that used to emanate from the well. Ashoka's Edict no. VIII makes mention of this well, which was also known as "fiery well" or "hell on earth". Another popular legend states that this was the well where Ashoka threw 99 of his elder half-brother's heads and put the heads in the well to obtain the throne of the Mauryan Empire. However, in archaeological surveys, no evidence of head bones or a skeleton has been discovered from the well, which contradicts the Buddhist Sinhalese legend.

According to a myth, the well has a subterranean link with the Patala (netherworld) or hell; this was inferred on the basis that a saint found a heavy log in the well which was supposed to have been lost in the sea. Another geo-hydrological link suggested that Agam Kuan is connected to the Ganges river. The site is also connected with several Jain legends, the most notable of them being that of a Jain monk, Sudarshana, who, when thrown into the well by a king named Chand, floated to the surface and was found seated on a lotus.

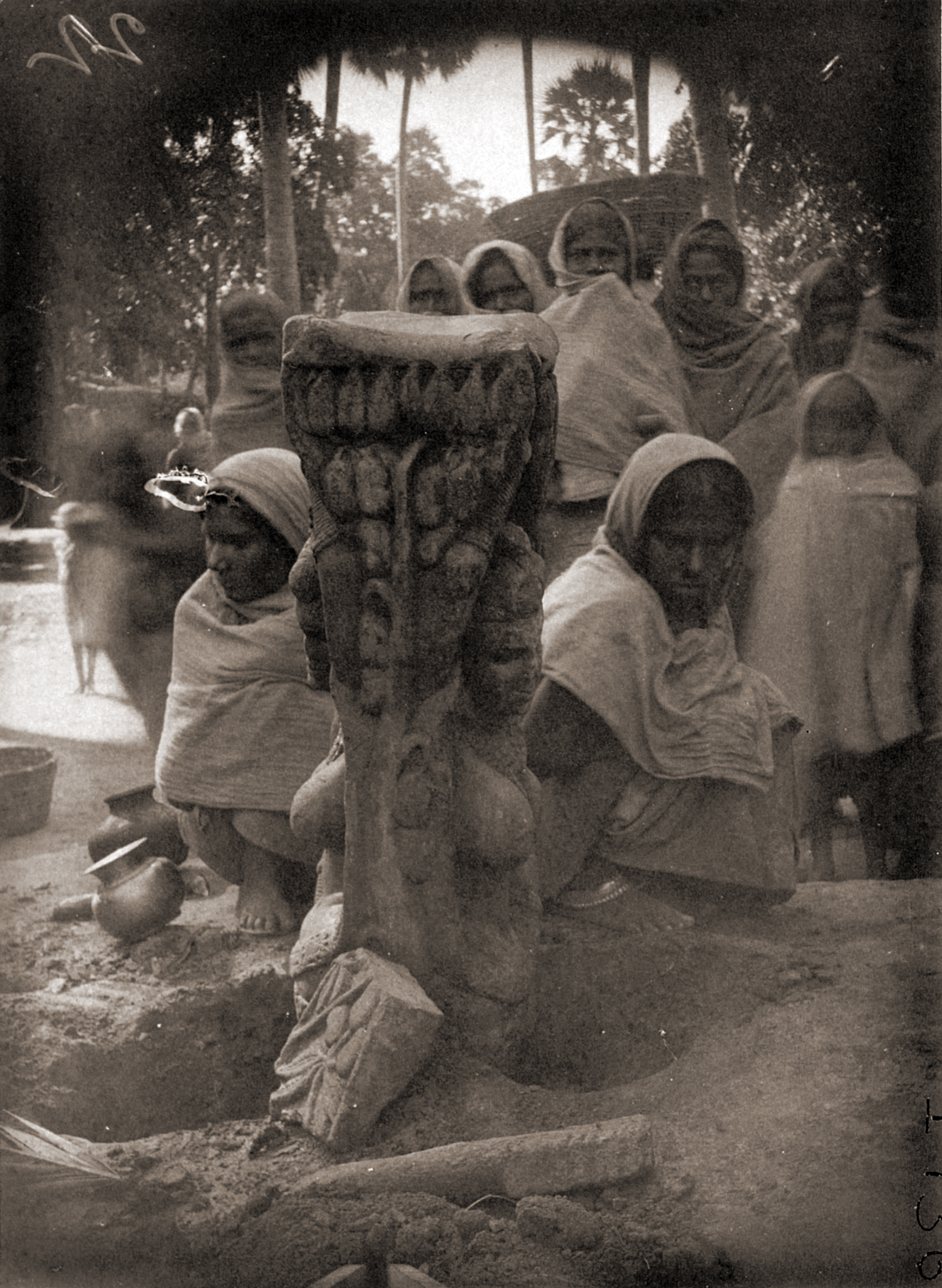
Statue of Matrikas found near Agam Kuan.

Visitors throw coins into Agam Kuan, as it is still considered auspicious. It is used for many religious ceremonies, especially Hindu weddings. Although it is venerated, the well waters are not consumed. Offerings of flowers and coins are thrown into the well usually during summer months as the well's history is linked to "heat and hell". Dating to Mohammedan rule, the Mughal officials offered coins of gold and silver to Agam Kuan.

== Features ==
The structure is 105 feet (32 m) deep, circular in plan, with a diameter extending over 4.5 metres (15 ft). It is brick-encased in the upper half to a depth of 44 feet (13 m) while the lower 61 feet (19 m) are secured by a series of wooden rings. Covered with moss, the surface structure, which now covers the well and forms its most distinctive feature, has eight arched windows. During the reign of emperor Akbar a roofed structure was constructed over the well. This circular structure has been fitted with eight windows which are well placed.

== Grounds ==
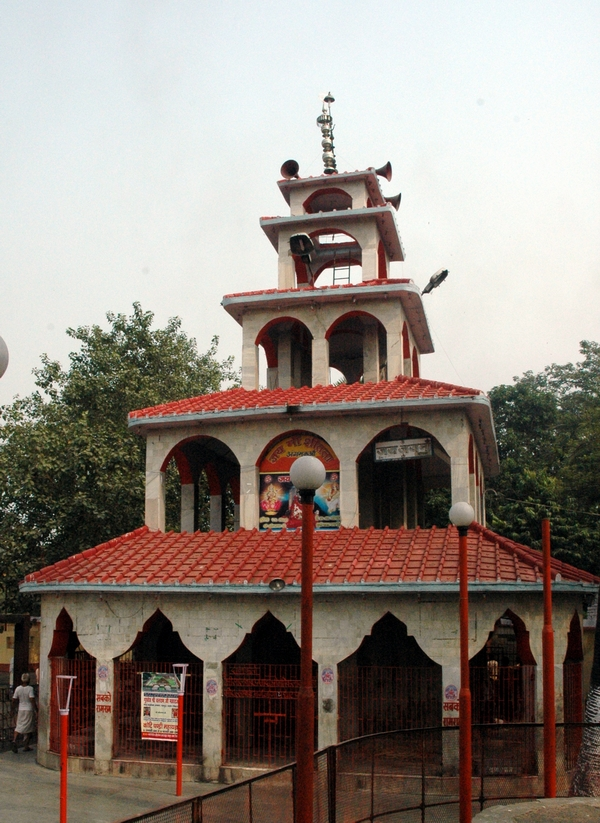
The Shitala Devi temple

In addition to the Agam Kuan, the archaeological site features a temple, as well as several ancient and medieval sculptures. The Shitala Devi temple is adjacent to the well, and is dedicated to Shitala Devi, which houses the pindas of the Saptamatrikas (the seven mother goddesses). The temple is widely venerated for its belief in curing smallpox and chicken pox, and it is also visited by devotees for wish fulfilment. The temple's female priest is an uncommon practice.

A statue of Yaksha of the Mauryan art period stands guard outside the temple. It was described earlier by Alexander Cunningham when he visited the site in 1879–80. This artefact is not traceable in the present day.

== See also ==
- Patan Devi
- Mahavir Mandir

== Bibliography ==
- Kapoor, Subodh (2002). The Indian Encyclopaedia: Mahi-Mewat. Cosmo Publications. ISBN 978-81-7755-272-0.
- O’Brien, Derek. Derek Introduces: 100 Iconic Indians. Rupa Publications. ISBN 978-81-291-3413-4.
- O'Malley, Lewis Sidney Steward (1924). Bihar And Orissa District Gazetteers Patna. Concept Publishing Company. ISBN 978-81-7268-121-0.
- Sinha, Nishi (1999). Tourism Perspective in Bihar. APH Publishing. ISBN 978-81-7024-975-7.
- Vishnu, Asha (1993). Material Life of Northern India: Based on an Archaeological Study, 3rd Century B.C. to 1st Century B.C. Mittal Publications. ISBN 978-81-7099-410-7.
