= Viraat Ramayan Mandir =

Hindu temple in India

- विराट रामायण मंदिर
- Plan of Viraat Ramayan Mandir

- Location in Bihar

Religion
- Affiliation: Hinduism
- Deity: Rama, Sita and Shiva
- Festival: Rama Navami • Deepavali • Vijayadashami
- Governing body: Mahavir Mandir Trust, Patna
- Status: Under construction

Location
- Location: Kaithawalia, NH-227A, Chakia-Kesariya road, East Champaran, Bihar
- State: Bihar
- Country: India
- Coordinates: 26.382°N 84.933°E

Architecture
- Creator: Mahavira Mandiram Trust, Patna
- Completed: 2026 (expected)
- Site area: 161 acres

Website
- viraatramayanmandir.com

Viraat Ramayan Mandir is an under-construction Hindu temple complex located at the twin villages of Kaithawalia and Bahuara, near Chakia in East Champaran district of Tirhut division, Bihar, India.

The project is being developed by the Mahavir Mandir Trust, Patna, and is planned to be one of the largest Hindu temple complexes in the world.

The temple complex is dedicated primarily to Lord Rama and Sita, and is inspired by the architectural style of Angkor Wat in Cambodia. It is designed to include multiple shrines and is expected to be completed by 2026. . It is being built with a cost of 500 crore rupees and is planned to be 123 metres (405 ft) high, double height of Angkor Wat Hindu Temple in Cambodia, and to have a hall that seats 20,000 people.

Virat Ramayan Mandir is completely funded by the Mahavir Mandir Patna Trust, Tata is the construction company which has subcontracted the Suntech Infra Solutions for the civil works which has previously undertaken other successful projects in Bihar such as NTPC, Fertilizer and IOCL Barauni. The construction of the temple, scheduled to commence in June 2015, was delayed due to Cambodia government's protest to the government of India however the issue was successfully resolved. The expected completion date is 2026.

== Planning ==
The temple is inspired from Angkor Wat of Cambodia and Ramanathaswamy Temple of Rameshvaram and Meenakshi Sundareshvara Temple of Madurai in Tamilnadu. The temple will comprise 18 shrines for various Hindu deities; Rama and Sita being the principal deities. The plan is spearheaded by Acharya Kishore Kunal.

Patna based, Mahavira Mandiram Trust first proposed the project, as Virata Angkor Wat Rama Sita Mandiram in Hajipur modeled on Angkor Wat, the twin city of Patna. The temple trust acquired 65 hectares (161 acres) of land in East Champaran district and therefore the earlier site of Hajipur had been abandoned.

In August 2012, following the concerns raised by the Cambodian Government, the Indian Government requested the Mahavira Mandiram Trust to not build exact replica of Angkor Wat as it will collapse due to the structural weakness. Consequently, the trust changed the name from the Virata Angkor Wat Rama Sita Temple to the Virata Ramayana Mandiram. On November 13, 2013, Bihar chief minister Nitish Kumar unveiled a model of the temple.

== Shivling ==
The Viraat Ramayan Mandir complex also includes a large Shiva temple where a massive monolithic Shivling has been installed. The Shivling, carved from a single block of black granite, is considered one of the largest in the world. It measures approximately 33 feet in height and weighs around 210 tonnes. It was crafted in Mahabalipuram, Tamil Nadu, and transported to Bihar using special heavy-load transport systems.

The Shivling was installed on 17 January 2026, following traditional Vedic rituals and ceremonies conducted by priests and saints.

The inclusion of a Shiva shrine within a temple complex dedicated to Rama and Sita reflects the harmony between Shaivite and Vaishnav traditions in Hinduism.

== Location ==
It is located 120 km northeast of Patna - the capital of Bihar, 102 km northeast of Vaishali, 12 km west of Chakia, 31 km south of Motihari, and 86 km south of Raxaul. Its exact location is at Janaki Nagar south of Motihari in East Champaran district in North Bihar. It will be spread over an area of 51 hectares (125 acres) at Bahuara-Kathwalia villages on Chakia-Kesariya road in East Champaran district. It will be 850 metres (2,800 ft) in length, 430 metres (1,400 ft) in width and 123 metres (405 ft) in height.

== Temple Trust ==
Since 1987 Mahavir Mandir is managed by a trust composed of 11 members. This trust is Registered under Bihar Hindu Religious Trust Act, 1950. As of February 2024, the following people were the trustees:

- Justice BN Agrawal retd. (President)
- Acharya Kishore Kunal, retd. IPS (Secretary)
- Justice Rajendra Prasad, retd. (Treasurer)
- VS Dubey, retd. IAS
- Ram Balak Mahto, Advocate General
- Ram Sundar Das, former Chief Minister
- Kashi Nath Mishra, former VC
- Justice SN Jha, retd.
- RK Shrivastava, retd. IAS
- Mrs Mahashweta Maharathi, Bodh Gaya
- Mahant Ramashray Das, Ayodhya

== See also ==
- Vrindavan Chandrodaya Mandir
- Mahavir Mandir
