= Laurence Waddell =

British explorer, professor, amateur archaeologist and surgeon

Laurence Waddell CB CIE FLS FRAS
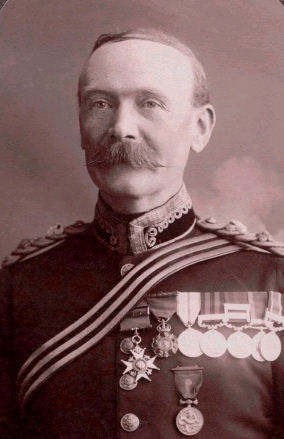
- Born: May 29, 1854; Scotland
- Died: September 19, 1938 (aged 84)
- Education: University of Glasgow
- Occupations: Army surgeon; Explorer; Professor; Archaeologist; Author
- Employers: Indian Medical Service; Medical College of Kolkata; University College London
- Known for: Studies on Tibetan Buddhism; Cultural consultant for the 1903–1904 Tibet Expedition; Identification of Lumbini as Buddha's birthplace; Excavations at Pataliputra
- Parents: Rev. Thomas Clement Waddell; Jean Chapman
- Military career
- Allegiance: United Kingdom
- Branch: Indian Medical Service (British Indian Army)
- Rank: Lieutenant Colonel
- Conflicts: Third Anglo-Burmese War; Boxer Rebellion; Relief of Peking; Mahsud-Waziri Blockade; British expedition to Tibet
- Awards: CB; CIE; China War Medal (1900); Tibet Medal

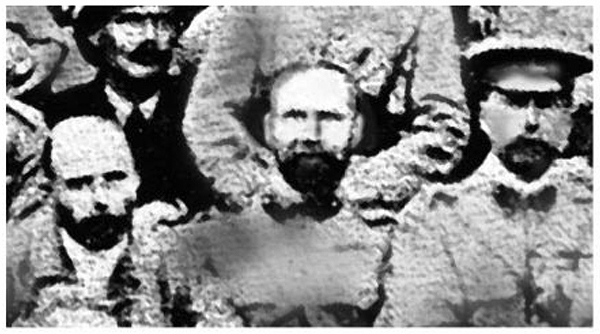
British Army officers in Tibet during 1904, Laurence Waddell (center)

Lieutenant Colonel Laurence Austine Waddell, CB, CIE, F.L.S., L.L.D, M.Ch., I.M.S. RAI, F.R.A.S (29 May 1854 – 19 September 1938) was a Scottish explorer, Professor of Tibetan, Professor of Chemistry and Pathology, Indian Army surgeon, collector in Tibet, and amateur archaeologist. Waddell also studied Sumerian and Sanskrit; he made various translations of seals and other inscriptions. His reputation as an Assyriologist gained little to no academic recognition and his books on the history of civilization have caused controversy. Some of his book publications however were popular with the public, and he is regarded by some today to have been a real-life precursor of the fictional character Indiana Jones.

== Life ==
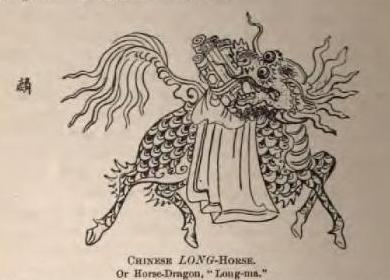
A Chinese Horse-Dragon, Reproduced in Waddell's, "The Buddhism of Tibet: Or Lamaism, with Its Mystic Cults, Symbolism and Mythology ...", 1895. Unknown Chinese artist.

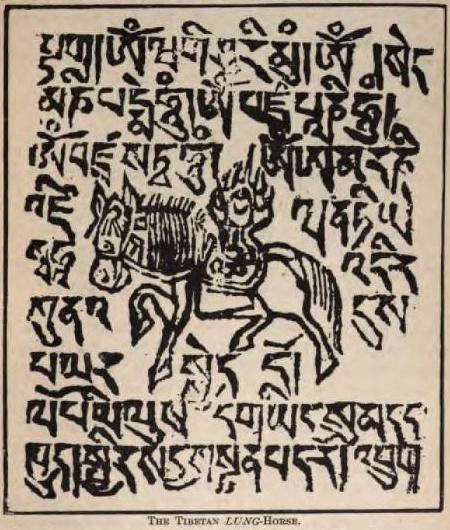
A Tibetan Lung-Horse, Reproduced in Waddell's, "The Buddhism of Tibet: Or Lamaism, with Its Mystic Cults, Symbolism and Mythology ...", 1895. Unknown Tibetan artist.

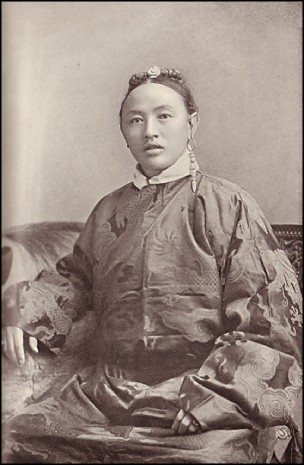
A photo of Paljor Dorje Shatra, Reproduced in Waddell's "Lhasa and Its Mysteries-With a Record of the British Tibetan Expedition of 1903–1904", 1905.

Laurence Waddell was born on 29 May 1854, and was the son of Rev. Thomas Clement Waddell, a Doctor of Divinity at Glasgow University and Jean Chapman, daughter of John Chapman of Banton, Stirlingshire. Laurence Waddell obtained a bachelor's degree in Medicine followed by a master's degree in both Surgery and Chemistry at Glasgow University in 1878. His first job was as a resident surgeon near the university and was also the President of Glasgow University's Medical Society. In 1879 he visited Ceylon and Burma and was 'irresistibly attracted' towards Buddhism which in later years led him to study the tenets, history and art of Buddhism. In 1880 Waddell joined the British Indian Army and served as a medical officer with the Indian Medical Service (I.M.S), subsequently he was stationed in India and the Far East (Tibet, China and Burma). The following year he became a professor of chemistry and pathology at the Medical College of Kolkata, India. While working in India, Waddell also studied Sanskrit and edited the Indian Medical Gazette. He became Assistant Sanitary Commissioner under the government of India.

After Waddell worked as a professor of Chemistry and Pathology for 6 years, he became involved in military expeditions across Burma and Tibet. Between 1885 and 1887 Waddell took part in the British expedition that annexed Upper Burma, which defeated Thibaw Min the last king of the Konbaung dynasty. After his return from Burma Waddell was stationed in Darjeeling district, India, and was appointed Principal Medical Officer in 1888. In the 1890s Waddell, while in Patna, established that Agam Kuan was part of Ashoka's Hell. His first publications were essays and articles on medicine and zoology, most notably "The Birds of Sikkim" (1893). In 1895 he obtained a doctorate in law.

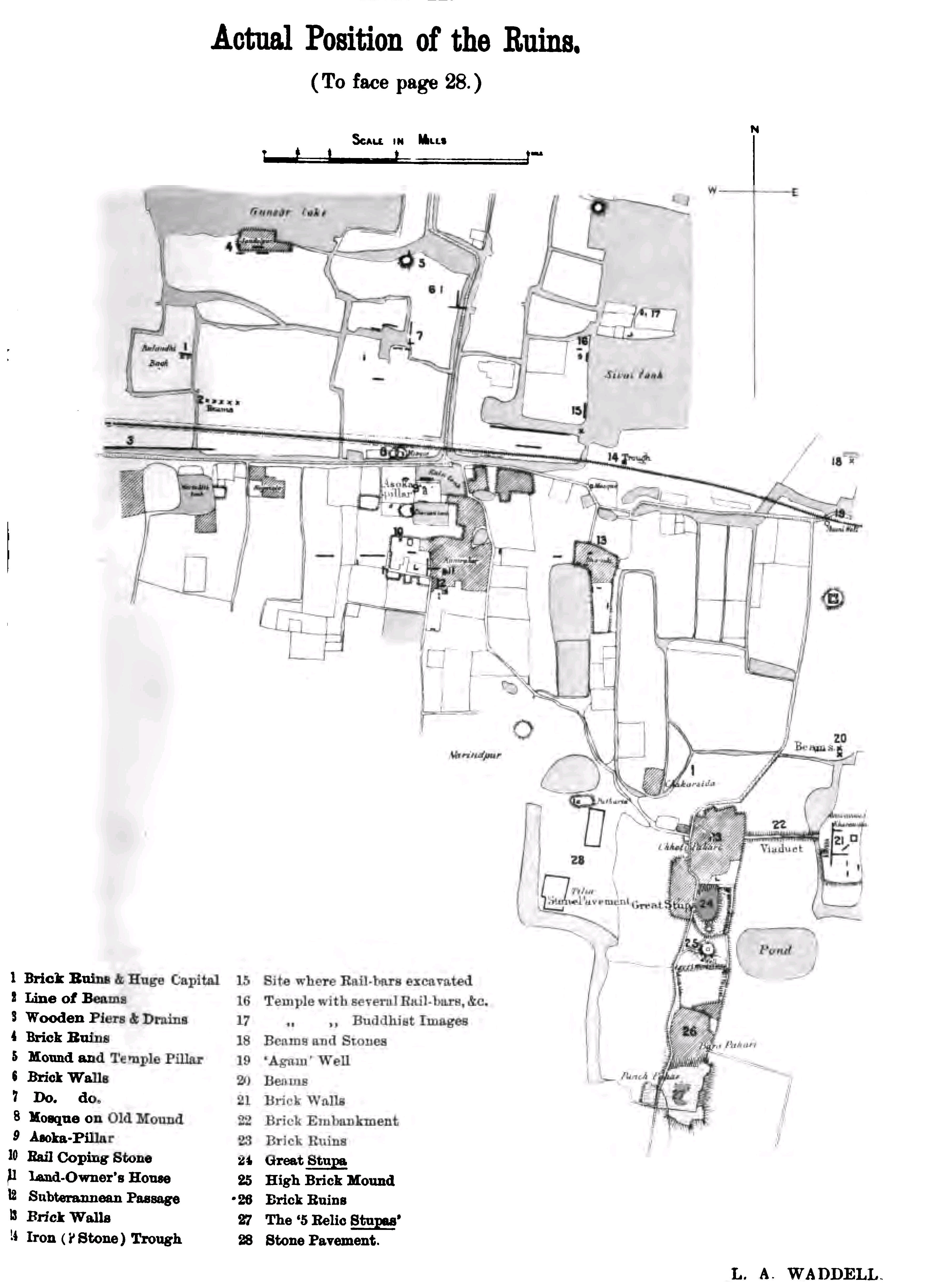
Map of 1895 excavations by Laurence Waddell at Pataliputra.

Waddell traveled extensively in India throughout the 1890s (including Sikkim and areas on the borders of Nepal and Tibet) and wrote about the Tibetan Buddhist religious practices he observed there. Stationed with the British army in Darjeeling, Waddell learned the Tibetan language and even visited Tibet several times secretly, in disguise. He was the cultural consultant on the 1903–1904 British invasion of Tibet led by Colonel Sir Francis Edward Younghusband, and was considered alongside Sir Charles Bell as one of the foremost authorities on Tibet and Tibetan Buddhism. Waddell studied archaeology and ethnology in-between his military assignments across India and Tibet, and his exploits in the Himalayas were published in his highly successful book Among the Himalayas (1899). Various archaeological excavations were also carried out and supervised by Waddell across India, including Pataliputra, of which he did not receive recognition of discovery until long after his death, in 1982, by the government of Bengal. His discoveries at Pataliputra were published in an official report in 1892.

During the 1890s Waddell specialised in Buddhist antiquities and became a collector, between 1895 and 1897 he published "Reports on collections of Indo-Scythian Buddhist Sculptures from the Swat Valley", in 1893 he also read a paper to the International Congress of Orientalists: "On some newly found Indo-Grecian Buddhistic Sculptures from the Swat Valley". In 1895 Waddell published his book Buddhism of Tibet or Lamaism, which was one of the first works published in the west on Buddhism. As a collector, Waddell had come across many Tibetan manuscripts and maps, but was disappointed to not find a single reference to a lost ancient civilization, which he had hoped to discover.

Waddell continued his military service with the Indian Medical Service. He was in China during the Boxer Rebellion (1898–1901), including the Relief of Peking in August 1900, for which he was mentioned in despatches, received the China War Medal (1900) with clasp, and was in 1901 appointed a Companion of the Order of the Indian Empire (CIE). By late 1901 he had moved to North-West Frontier Province and was present during the Mahsud-Waziri Blockade, 1901–1902. He was in Malakand in 1902 and took part in the Tibet Mission to Lhasa 1903–04, for which he was again mentioned in despatches, received a medal with clasp and was appointed a Companion of the Order of the Bath (CB). Waddell then returned to England, where he briefly became Professor of Tibetan at the University College of London (1906–1908).

In 1908, Waddell began to learn Sumerian. Thus in his later career he turned to studying the ancient near east, especially Sumeria and dedicated his time to deciphering or translating ancient cuneiform tablets or seals, most notably including the Scheil dynastic tablet. In 1911, Waddell published two entries in the Encyclopædia Britannica. By 1917, Waddell was fully retired and first started exclusively writing on Aryans, beginning in an article published in the Asiatic Review entitled "Aryan Origin of the World's Civilization". From the 1920s Waddell published several works which attempted to prove an Aryan (i.e., Indo-European) origin of the alphabet and the appearance of Indo-European myth figures in ancient Near Eastern mythologies (e.g., Hittite, Sumerian, Babylonian). The foundation of his argument is what he saw as a persistence of cult practices, religious symbols, mythological stories and figures, and god and hero names throughout Western and Near Eastern civilizations, but also based his arguments on his deciphered Sumerian and Indus-Valley seals, and other archaeological findings.

Waddell died in 1938. That same year, he had completed writing Trojan Origin of World Civilization. The book was never published.

== Discovery of Buddha's Birthplace ==
Waddell had travelled around British controlled India in search for Kapilavastu, the Buddha's supposed birthplace. Cunningham had previously identified Kapilavastu as the village of Bhuila in India which Waddell and other orientalists concluded to be incorrect. They were searching for the birthplace by taking into account the topographical and geographical hints left by the ancient Chinese travellers, Fa Hien and Hiuen Tsiang. Waddell was first to point out the importance of the discovery of Asoka's pillar in Nigliva in 1893 and estimate Buddha's birthplace as Lumbini. He subsequently corresponded with Government of India and arranged for the exploration of the area. Waddell also was appointed to conduct the exploration to recover the inscriptions, etc.; but at the last moment, when due to adverse circumstances prevented him from proceeding, and Mr. Führer was sent to carry out the exploration arranged by him, he found the Lumbini grove, etc., with their inscriptions at the very spots pointed out by him.

== Waddell's theories ==
Tibetan Buddhism

The Buddhism of Tibet or Lamaism, With Its Mystic Cults, Symbolism and Mythology and in Its Relation to Indian Buddhism (1st ed. London, 1895) is an early work that was very influential in forming Western ideas of Tibet and its Buddhist traditions, especially in the non-scholarly Anglophone world. It was a treasure-trove of then-new factual information on its subject, some of which retains value even today. Unfortunately, Waddell's prejudices – colored by his British imperialist sense of the superiority of European, "Christian" civilization – permeate the work. Today it would be classified as heavily "Orientalist" in the negative, Saidean sense. At times the work veers into racist stereotyping of the Tibetan people and their culture, and at times it displays disgust toward what it characterizes as the primitive superstition and immoral demonolatry of "Lamaism," Waddell's name for his representation of Tibetan Buddhism. Tibetologists and Buddhologists today mainly cite this book as a classic, graphic example of nineteenth century European Orientalist bigotry.

Waddell's voluminious writings after his retirement were based on an attempt to prove the Sumerians (who he identified as Aryans) as the progenitors of other ancient civilizations, such as the Indus Valley civilization and ancient Egyptians to "the classic Greeks and Romans and Ancient Britons, to whom they [the Sumerians] passed on from hand to hand down the ages the torch of civilization". He is perhaps most remembered for his controversial translations; the Scheil dynastic tablet, the Bowl of Utu and Newton Stone, as well as his British Edda.

=== Phoenicians ===
Waddell in Phoenician Origin of Britons, Scots, and Anglo-Saxons (1924) argued for a Syro-Hittite and Phoenician colonization of the British Isles, turning to British folklore that mentions Trojans, such as the "Brutus Stone" in Totnes and Geoffrey of Monmouth; place-names that supposedly preserve the Hittite language, and inscriptions, as evidence.

According to Waddell the "unknown" script on the Newton Stone is Hitto-Phoenician. His translation is as follows:

"This Sun-Cross (Swastika) was raised to Bil (or Bel, the God of Sun-Fire) by the Kassi (or Cassi-bel[-an]) of Kast of the Siluyr (sub-clan) of the "Khilani" (or Hittite-palace-dwellers), the Phoenician (named) Ikar of Cilicia, the Prwt (or Prat, that is 'Barat' or 'Brihat' or Brit-on)."

Brutus of Troy, Waddell also regarded to be a real historical figure. In a chapter entitled "COMING OF THE "BRITONS" OR ARYAN BRITO-PHOENICIANS UNDER KING BRUTUS-THE-TROJAN TO ALBION ABOUT 1103, B.C", Waddell writes:

"This migration of King Brutus and his Trojan and Phoenician refugees from Asia Minor and Phoenicia to establish a new homeland colony in Albion, which event the British Chronicle historical tradition places at 1103 B.C. was probably associated with, and enforced by, not merely the loss of Troy, but also by the massacring invasion of Hittite Asia Minor, Cilicia and the Syria-Phoenician coast of the Mediterranean by the Assyrian King Tiglath Pileser I. about 1107 B.C. to 1105 B.C."

==== Reception ====
Book cover "Lhasa and its Mysteries" third edition in 1906

Waddell's contemporaries reviewed the book very negatively. One reviewer considered the content to be "admirable fooling", but that he had "an uneasy feeling that the author really believes it". It has also been pointed out that Waddell took the Historia Regum Britanniae to be literal history which is why he was almost asking to be ridiculed by historians:

"Contrary to the general opinion of historians, he [Waddell] accepts as authentic the chronicle of Geoffrey of Monmouth, and regards as historical the legend of King Brut of Troy having reached Britain with his followers about the year 1103 BC, founded London a few years later, and spread through the land Phoenician culture, religion and art [...] His views indeed are so unorthodox that he is no doubt prepared for strong criticism, and even ridicule. King Brut of Troy has long been relegated to the company of old wives' tales."

=== Indus-Valley seals ===
The first Indus Valley or Harappan seal was published by Alexander Cunningham in 1872. It was half a century later, in 1912, when more Indus Valley seals were discovered by J. Fleet, prompting an excavation campaign under Sir John Hubert Marshall in 1921–22, resulting in the discovery of the ancient civilization at Harappa (later including Mohenjo-daro). As seals were discovered from the Indus Valley, Waddell in 1925 first attempted to decipher them and claimed they were of Sumerian origin in his Indo-Sumerian Seals Deciphered.

==== Reception ====
In the 1920s, Waddell's theory that the Indus-Valley seals were Sumerian had some academic support, despite criticisms; Ralph Turner considered Waddell's work to be "fantasy". Two notable supporters of Waddell included John Marshall, the Director-General of the Archaeological Survey of India until 1928, and Stephen Herbert Langdon. Marshall had led the main excavation campaign at Harappa and published his support for Waddell's Sumerian decipherment in 1931. Preston however in a section of her biography of Waddell entitled "Opposition to Indo-Sumerian Seals Deciphered" points out that support for Waddell's theory had disappeared by the early 1940s through the work of Mortimer Wheeler:

"However, a shift, which made his [Waddell's] claim appear untenable, occurred in the consensus in archaeology after Sir Mortimer Wheeler was put in charge of the Archaeological Survey of India [...] Wheeler's interpretation of the archaeological data was the guideline for scholars who appear to have ruled out the possibility that the language of the seals could be akin to Sumerian and Proto-Elamite."

=== Sumerian language ===
The non-Semitic source of the Sumerian language was established in the late 19th century by Julius Oppert and Henry Rawlinson from which many different theories were proposed as to its origin. In his works Aryan Origin of the Alphabet and Sumer-Aryan Dictionary (1927) Waddell attempted to show the Sumerian language was of Aryan (Indo-European) root.

==== Reception ====
Waddell's Sumerian-Aryan equation did not receive any support at the time, despite having sent personal copies of his two books to Archibald Sayce. Professor Langdon, who had earlier offered Waddell his support for a Sumerian or Proto-Elamite decipherment of the Indus-Valley seals, dismissed Waddell's publications on the Sumerian language itself:

"The author [Waddell] has slight knowledge of Sumerian, and commits unpardonable mistakes [...] The meanings assigned to Sumerian roots are almost entirely erroneous. One can only regret the publication of such fantastic theories, which cannot possibly do service to serious science in any sense whatsoever."

=== Chronology ===
Waddell in The Makers of Civilization (1929) and Egyptian Civilization Its Sumerian Origin and Real Chronology (1930) revised conventional dates for most ancient civilizations and king lists. For example, he believed the Early Dynastic Period of Egypt began c. 2700 BC, not c. 3100 BC, arguing that Menes, was Manis-Tusu, the son of Sargon, who in turn was King Minos of Crete. For Waddell, the earliest ancient rulers or mythological kings of Sumer, Egypt, Crete and the Indus Valley civilizations were all identical Aryan personages.

==== Reception ====
To support his revised chronology, Waddell acquired and translated several artefacts including the Scheil dynastic tablet and the Bowl of Utu. Waddell was praised for his acquisition of the latter. However Waddell's translations were always highly unorthodox and not taken seriously. The Makers of Civilization was panned in a review by Harry L. Shapiro:

"The reader does not need to peruse this work very far to become aware of its distinct bias and unscientific method. Fortunately the 'Nordic race-mongers' have become discredited that there is little to fear from the effect of this opus on the intelligent lay public. Succinctly, Mr. Waddell believes that the beginning of all civilization dates from the Nordic [Aryan] Sumerians who were blond Nordics with blue eyes."

Waddell during his own life, was deemed to be anachronistic by most scholars because of his supremacist views regarding the Aryan race:

"One of the reasons for the literary oblivion of Waddell's works on the history of civilization with an Aryan theme is [...] in relation to the fact that he did not give up the quest for the Aryans in terms of racial origins when it was abandoned in the 1870s, and it was very influential in his choice of career [...] His comparative studies and decipherment led him to a completely controversial and alternative perspective of ancient history. Furthermore, the titles that are now little known may have been sidelined due his use of the term 'Aryan' as it became associated with the rise of Nazism."

=== Pan-Sumerism ===
Waddell from 1917 (having first published the article "Aryan Origin of the World's Civilization") until his death was a proponent of hyperdiffusionism ("Pan-Sumerism") arguing that many cultures and ancient civilizations, such as the Indus Valley civilization, Minoan Crete, Phoenicia, and Dynastic Egypt, were the product of Aryan Sumerian colonists.

Grafton Elliot Smith who pioneered hyperdiffusionism (but of the Egyptians) was an influential correspondent to Waddell.

==== Reception ====
R. Sawyer (1985) points out that Waddell "was of the eccentric opinion that Western, Indian and ancient Egyptian culture derived from a common Sumerian ancestry" and that his ideas were far-fetched to untenable. Gabriel Moshenska of the UCL Institute of Archaeology has noted:

"Waddell's hopes of rewriting the story of civilization with the Aryan race as the first and only protagonist rapidly faded as his works and ideas remained restricted to, if well rooted in, the ultra right wing fringes of society and scholarship. J. H. Harvey, member of the pro-Nazi Imperial Fascist League and later a respected medievalist, wrote a short book The Heritage of Britain (1940) which aimed to summarise Waddell's works for a narrower audience on the fringes of the British Fascist movement (Macklin 2008). The British-Israelite W. T. F. Jarrold used Waddell's study of the Newton Stone to support a Biblical origin for the Anglo-Saxon race (1927). Today Waddell's works are read and referenced most commonly by white supremacists, esoteric scholars and conspiracy theorists such as David Icke (1999)."

== Collections ==
Waddell collected bird specimens and it was on the basis of one of them that Henry Dresser named the species Babax waddelli (the giant babax) in 1905. His collections were donated in 1894 to the Hunterian Museum at the University of Glasgow. Some specimens are in the Manchester Museum and at the Natural History Museum at London. The University of Glasgow holds Waddell's papers and manuscript collection.

== Tribute ==
The fish Gymnocypris waddellii Regan, 1905 was named in honor of Waddell, who preserved the type specimens in salt before presenting them to the British Museum (Natural History).

== Published books ==
(for book descriptions see footnotes)

- The non-bacillar nature of abrus-poison : with observations on its chemical and physiological properties (1884)
- The Buddhism of Tibet or Lamaism, With Its Mystic Cults, Symbolism and Mythology and in Its Relation to Indian Buddhism (1895)
- Lamaism in Sikhim (1895)
- Among the Himalayas (1899)
- The Tribes of the Brahmaputra valley (1901)
- Lhasa and Its Mysteries – With a Record of the British Tibetan Expedition of 1903–1904 (1905)
- The "Dhāranī" cult in Buddhism: its origin, deified literature and images (1912)
- Phoenician Origin of the Britons, Scots, and Anglo-Saxons (1924, 2nd ed. 1925)
- Indo-Sumerian Seals Deciphered discovering Sumerians of Indus Valley as Phoenicians, Barats, Goths & famous Vedic Aryans 3100-2300 B.C. (1925)
- Sumer-Aryan Dictionary. An Etymological Lexicon of the English and other Aryan Languages Ancient and Modern and the Sumerian Origin of Egyptian and its Hieroglyphs (1927)
- Aryan-Sumerian Origin of the Alphabet (1927)
- Questionary on the Sumerian markings upon prehistoric pottery found in the Danube & associated valleys of Middle Europe (1928, small booklet)
- Makers of Civilization in Race and History (1929)
- Egyptian Civilization Its Sumerian Origin and Real Chronology (1930)
- The British Edda (1930)

== Sources ==
- Buckland, C. E. (1906). Dictionary of Indian Biography. London : S. Sonnenschein.
- Thomas, F. W. (1939). "Colonel L. A. Waddell". The Journal of the Royal Asiatic Society of Great Britain and Ireland. 71 (3): 499–504. doi:10.1017/S0035869X00089577. JSTOR 25201976.
- Preston, C. (2009). The Rise of Man in the Gardens of Sumeria: A Biography of L.A. Waddell. Sussex Academic Press.
- Oxford Dictionary of National Biography: Waddell, Lawrence Augustine (1854–1938).
- Waddell Collection at the University of Glasgow: A collection of over 700 volumes dealing mainly with Assyrian and Sumerian languages, Archaeology, Asian history and folk-lore, and Buddhism. He made a notable contribution to the history of Buddhism. The printed book collection is supplemented by associated correspondence, working notes, photographs and press cuttings. Some of the books have manuscript annotations and inserts.

== See also ==
- David MacRitchie
- Christian O'Brien
- W. J. Perry
- Ethel Bristowe
- Grafton Elliot Smith
