= Patan Devi =

Hindu temple in India

Patan Devi Temple
- पटन देवी मंदिर
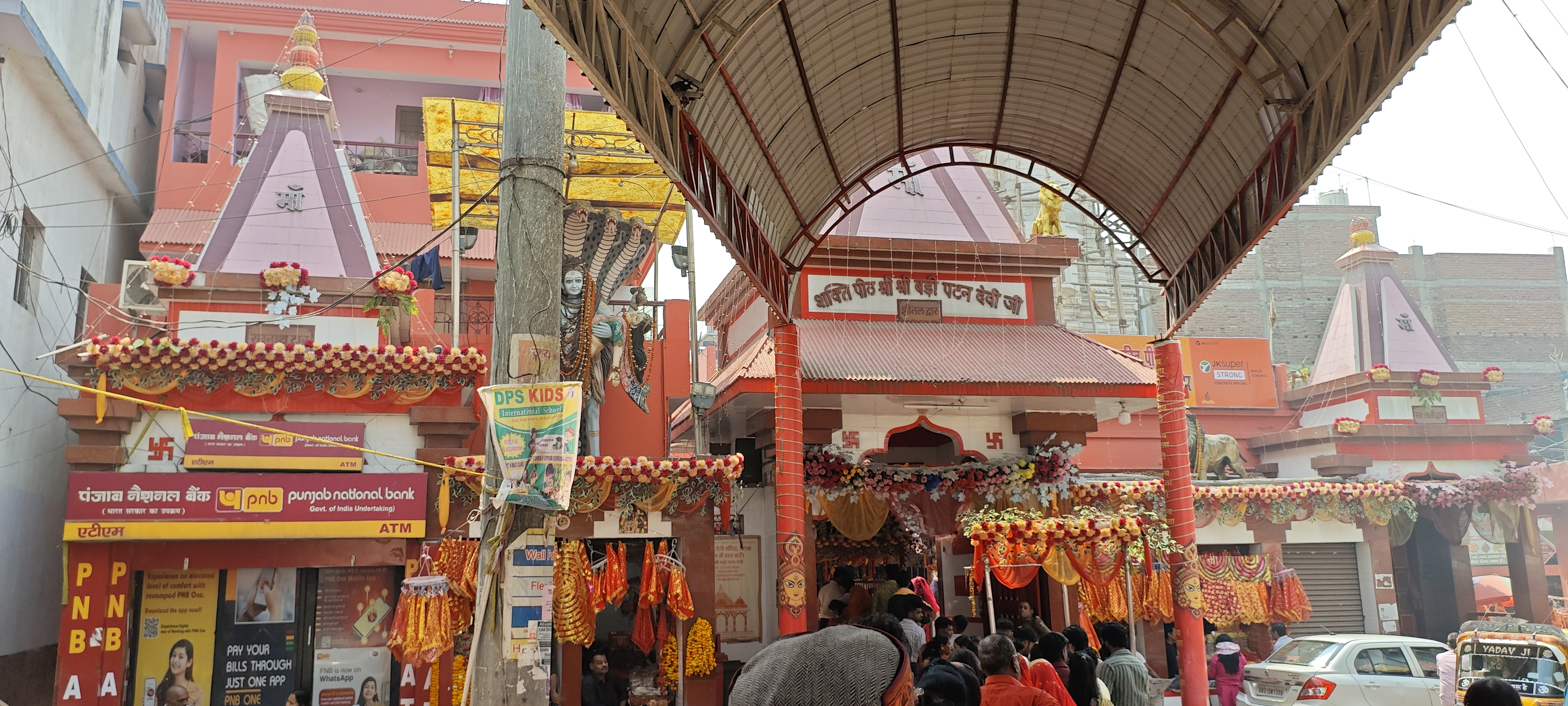

- Location in Bihar

Religion
- Affiliation: Hinduism
- District: Patna
- Deity: Sati
- Festival: Durga Puja

Location
- Location: Patna City
- State: Bihar
- Country: India
- Coordinates: 25.60531°N 85.20629°E

Architecture
- Type: Mandir

Patan Devi, also called Maa Patneshwari, is the oldest and one of the most sacred temples of Patna, Bihar. It is regarded as one of the 51 Siddha Shakta pithas in India. According to Puranic legends, the 'right thigh' of the corpse of Devi Sati had fallen here when it was chopped off by Lord Vishnu with his 'Sudarshan Chakra'. The ancient temple, originally called Maa Sarvanand Kari Patneshwari, is believed to be the abode of the goddess Durga.

The name of the city Patna is widely believed to have been derived from the name of the Badi Patan Devi Temple. Some, however, doubt whether the name of Patna is derived from this temple. According to them, the name is derived from patan, which means a town and Patna was a big place of export and import.

== History ==
=== Bari Patan Devi ===
The Bari Patan Devi Temple, Patna is facing the North, towards the Ganges river. The statues of the temple are all made up in black stone. At the entrance of the temple there is a portico of dimension 1.5 ft × 15 ft (0.46 m × 4.57 m). After that there is a room of about 8 ft × 8 ft (2.4 m × 2.4 m) for gods namely, Mahakali (12 in (300 mm)), Maha Lakshmi (6 in (150 mm))), Maha Saraswati (12 in (300 mm))) and Bhairav (3 in (76 mm))).All the idols are kept on simhasans (thrones) of about 4 square in cross section and have a height of about 7 feet (2.1 m)). First three goddesses are attired in sarees.

Badi Patan Devi temple was founded by Shri Badrinath Chaudhary, a famous inspector of British era. Devotees can go to the temple at any time of the day. The temple does not distinguish between any caste or creed and hence is open for all religions and castes. The temple remains open from morning 6 am to 10 pm. Tuesday is a special day for the devotees and a large number of worshipers visit the temple. Promises are being made before the Goddess and on the fulfillment of the wishes devotees offer gifts and sarees in the temple.

=== Chhoti Patan Devi ===
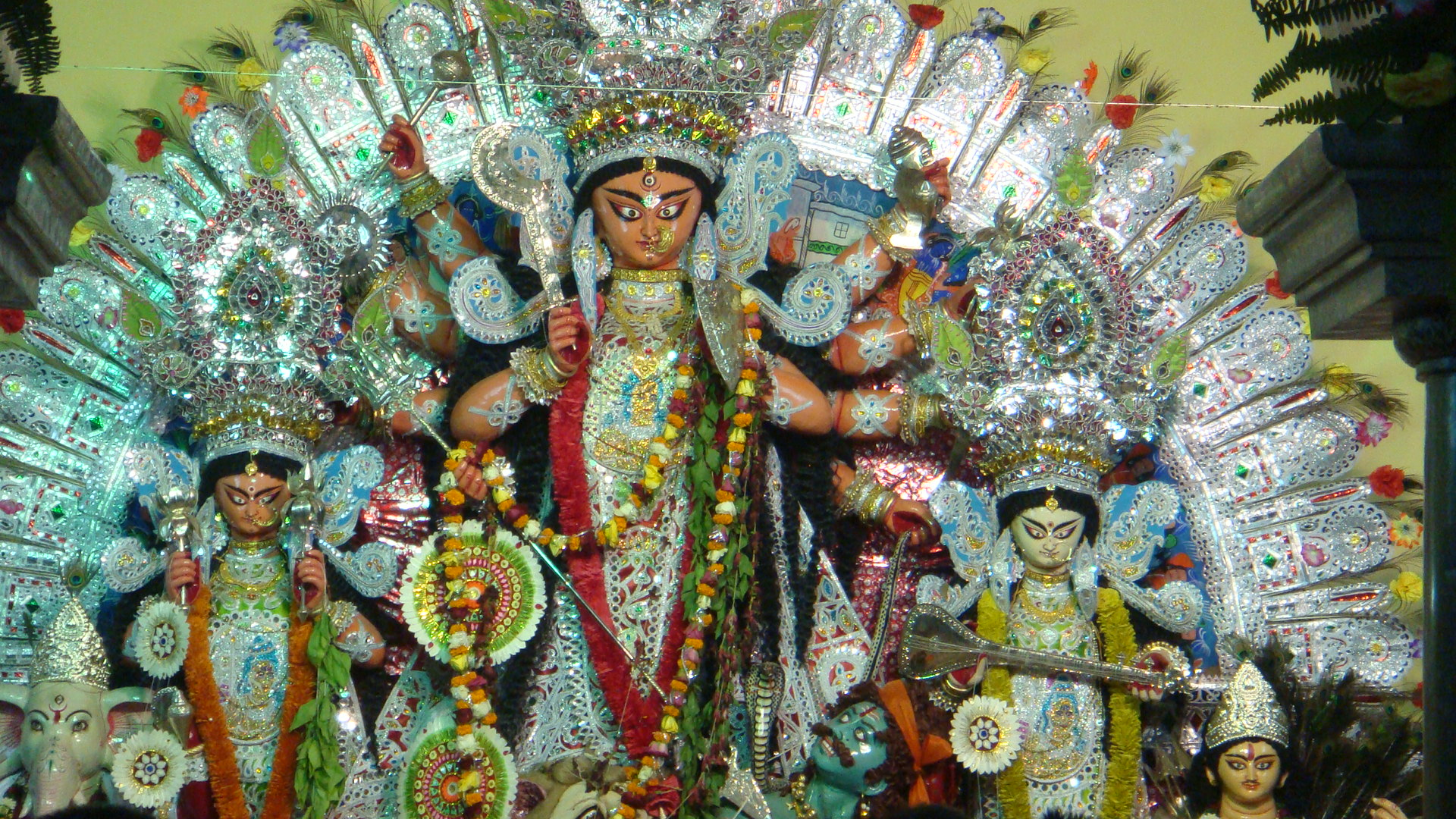
Chhoti Patan Devi

This temple is situated in the Chowk area of Patna City and once was considered as the main presiding deity of Patna. Over the years it has slipped to the second position of eminence, after the Bari Patan Devi temple, as city's presiding deity, with epithet 'Choti' (smaller) to the more popular one, the Bari (bigger) Patan Devi. But a historian called Buchanan was very specific in stating that it was this very temple (Choti Patendevi) which held the primary position as the city's presiding deity during 18th and early 19th century.

The present temple does not seem to be of any great antiquity. The images inside the temple, if Buchanan is to be believed, were installed by Man Singh, the famous general of the Mughal emperor Akbar. The temple, however, houses a host of intact and severed Brahmanical images, including, Ganesh, Vishnu and Surya. Beyond the temple, but within its precincts, lie in open fragments of door jumbs/lintels and yet other set of images. Of these, an impressive, but broken sun-image is the most prominent. According to many historians, it is very likely that some early medieval temple was built here sometime in 9th-11th Century CE and these fragmentary stray sculptural/structural relics are only its ruins. Probably, these were reinstalled in a new temple, built during the 16th-17th century by Man Singh. But authentic information on this count is woefully wanting.

== Important festivals ==
As in many other places, a mela is also held near these temples at the time of Vijayadashmi. On Saptami, Ashtami and Navami (Durga Puja)during the mela about 1000 people come to offer prayers daily at either of the two temples. Visitors generally bring sweets, garlands and fruits to offer to the deities. The priest of the temple takes some quantity of the prasad and returns the rest to the devotees. He marks their forehead with Rori (red powder). The devotees also give some money to the priest as dakshina.

As regards the routine of the rituals, the deity is daily bathed morning and evening and this is followed by offerings of prasad (fruits and sweetmeats etc.) and aarti with the usual reciting of mantras by the priest, accompanied by the ringing of bells.

== See also ==
- Mahavir Mandir
- Takht Sri Patna Sahib
- Hinduism
