= Ashoka's Hell =

Legendary torture chamber

Ashoka's Hell was, according to legend, an elaborate torture chamber disguised as a beautiful palace full of amenities such as exclusive baths and decorated with flowers, fruit trees and ornaments. It was built by Emperor Ashoka (304–232 BCE) in Pataliputra (modern-day Patna, India), the capital city of the Maurya Empire. The torture palace's legend is detailed in the Ashokavadana, which describes Emperor Ashoka's life through legendary and historical accounts.

According to legend, the palatial torture chamber was artfully designed to make its exterior visually pleasing, and was referred to as the "beautiful gaol". Beneath the veneer of beauty and deep inside the exclusive mansion, however, chambers were constructed filled with sadistic and cruel instruments of torture—including furnaces used to melt the metals that were to be poured on prisoners.

The narrative states the chamber's architect drew inspiration from the five tortures of the Buddhist hell. The Ashokavadana describes the torture chamber in such terrifying detail that it spawned a belief that Ashoka—in his quest to perfect its sinister design—had visited hell itself. Through a pact made between Ashoka and Girika, the official executioner of the torture chamber, anyone entering the palace, even by chance as a visitor, was not allowed to come out alive.

== Background ==
According to the narrations of Ashokavadana, Emperor Ashoka, prior to his conversion to Buddhism, was a fierce and sadistic ruler, known as Ashoka the Fierce, or Chandashoka (Ashoka the Cruel), who sent his minions on a quest to find a vicious man to work as his official executioner.

After some searching, Ashoka's men found a suitable candidate by the name of Girika who was so vicious that he killed his parents because they did not want him to become Ashoka's executioner. Girika was introduced to Ashoka, who soon appointed him the official executioner of his empire.

== Design ==
According to legend, Girika persuaded Ashoka to design the torture chamber based on the suffering endured by people reborn in Buddhist hell. The Ashokavadana documents a long list of torture acts Girika designed and planned to force upon his prisoners including "prying open their mouths with an iron and pouring boiling copper down their throats". Innocent people were not exempt from such treatment.

In the narrative of Ashokavadana, Ashoka asked Girika to disguise the torture chamber as a beautiful and "enticing" palace full of amenities such as exclusive baths and to decorate it with flowers, fruit trees and many ornaments. The palatial torture chamber was artfully designed to make people long to just look at it, and even attract them to enter, and was referred to as the "beautiful gaol".

According to the mythology, beneath the veneer of beauty, inside the exclusive mansion, torture chambers were constructed which were full of the most sadistic and cruel instruments of torture including furnaces producing molten metal for pouring on the prisoners.

In the narrative, Ashoka made a pact with Girika that he would never allow anyone who entered the palace to exit alive, including Ashoka himself. The torture chamber was so terrifying, that Emperor Ashoka was thought to have visited hell so that he could perfect its evil design. In the Biographical Sutra of Emperor Ashoka the palace is described by the sentence: 'Emperor Ashoka constructed a hell'.

Ashokavadana refers to Girika as Chandagirika or Girika the Cruel. It appears that Girika overheard a Buddhist monk recite the Balapanditasutta which contains vivid descriptions of the five tortures of hell, such as:

Finally, there are beings who are reborn in hell whom the hell-guardians grab, and stretch out on their backs on a fiery floor of red-hot iron that is but a mass of flames. Then they carry out the torture of the five-fold tether; they drive two iron stakes through their hands; they drive two iron stakes through their feet, and they drive one iron stake through their heart. Truly, O monks, hell is a place of great suffering

He got his ideas of how to torture prisoners from there. The text describes Girika's attitude toward punishment as follows: "Such are the five great agonies, Girika reflected, and he began to inflict these same tortures on people in his prison". In addition, the Balapanditasutta compares the King's torture methods to the tortures of hell.

== Miracle in the chamber ==
The Ashokavadana further mentions that sometime later a Buddhist monk by the name of Samudra happened to visit the palace and upon entering he was informed by Girika the Cruel, or Candagirika, that he would be tortured to death, and was subsequently led into the torture chamber. His torturers, however, failed to injure him and he appeared able to neutralise their torture methods by realising that the suffering of the other prisoners is part of the Buddhist dogma of suffering and attaining arhatship.

In the Eight Manifestations of Guru Padmasambhava, Samudra is Guru Shakya Senge (Wylie: shAkya seng-ge, Skt: Guru Śākyasimha) of Bodh Gaya. Meaning "Undefeatable Lion", Padmasambhava as Shakya Senge manifests as Ananda's student, travels to the torture chamber and brings Ashoka the Cruel to the Dharma through a display of miracles.

Narrations detail how Padmasambhava as Shakya Senge, or Samudra, while tortured in a cauldron full of boiling water, human blood, bone marrow and excrement, caused the contents of the cauldron to cool down and then sat meditating cross-legged on a lotus sprouting from the fluid. Narratives further describe that when Ashoka heard of these miracles, he was overcome with curiosity and decided to enter the chamber to verify for himself the veracity of the stories. After arriving there he witnessed Padmasambhava, or Samudra, levitating with half his body on fire and the other half raining water. Intrigued he asked the monk to identify himself.

Padmasambhava, or Samudra, replied that he was a disciple of Shakyamuni Buddha and adherent to the Dharma, and chastised Ashoka and Girika for having built the torture chamber and for torturing people. Ashoka was further instructed to build 84,000 stupas according to Buddha's prophecy, and to guarantee the security of all beings. To those demands, Ashoka acquiesced. Further, he confessed to his crimes and became a student of Buddhism and the Dharma.

After his taming by Padmasambhava in the torture chamber, the king Ashoka the Cruel, or Candashoka, became known as the king Dharmashoka.

== Demolition ==
The Ashokavadana describes the events leading to the demolition of Ashoka's torture chamber. According to the text, the torture chamber had become the site and the reason for his conversion to Buddhism. Girika, as the resident executioner of the chamber, however, reminded Ashoka of his pledge to kill anyone entering the chamber including Ashoka himself.

Ashoka then questioned Girika as to who entered the torture palace first during their visit to see Samudra's miracles. Girika was then forced to admit that it was he who entered first. Upon the executioner's confession, Ashoka ordered him to be burnt alive and also ordered the demolition of the torture palace. According to the Ashokavadana, "the beautiful jail was then torn down and a guarantee of security was extended to all beings".

From that point on, Ashoka became known as Ashoka the Pious. Buddhist monk Xuanzang in his writings mentions that in the 7th century AD he had visited the place where Ashoka's torture chamber once was and that it was, even at that time, referred to in Hindu tradition as "Ashoka's Hell". Xuanzang also claimed that he saw the column identifying the location of Ashoka's Hell.

In India, the palace is known as "Ashoka's Hell" and its location near Pataliputra became a popular destination for pilgrims. In the 5th century, Faxian, also a Buddhist monk, reports visiting it and his account of the story of the palace differs slightly from that of Xuanzang's. In the 1890s, British explorer Laurence Waddell, while in Patna, established that Agam Kuan, which means the "unfathomable well", was part of Ashoka's Hell as reported also by the two Chinese monks. However, in archaeological surveys, no evidence of head bones or a skeleton has been discovered from the well, which contradicts the Buddhist legend.

== See also ==
- Inferno, a book by Dante
