= The British Edda =

Book by Lawrence Waddell

- Author: Laurence Waddell
- Language: English
- Subject: Language, translation
- Publication date: 1930
- Publication place: United Kingdom
- Media type: Print
- Pages: 480pp

The British Edda is a 1930 English book written by Laurence Waddell about the adventures of El, Wodan and Loki forming an "Eden Triad" in the Garden of Eden. It also references Thor and King Arthur having adventures in Eden.

== Background ==
=== Cover ===
The spine of the book features a swastika "imprinted in gold color". The swastika was chosen because of it being a "Sun-cult symbol to the Phoenicians and Hittites", two subjects covered in the book. The front of the book features an image of the Snake Goddess from the Boston Goddess collection. According to Waddell the statuette was first created in 2700 B.C. as an example of "Eve or Ifo, Gunn-Ifo or Guen-Ever, as Serpent-Priestess of Eden before marriage with King Her-Thor, Arthur, or Adam". He also stated his belief that the Snake Goddess was from a representation of "prototypes" from Sumerian and Hittite gods, rather than from Crete as is commonly thought.

=== Title ===
The title of the book, The British Edda, was chosen because of Waddell's belief that the work upon which his translation was based, the Elder Edda, was mistakenly believed by many to be written in Scandinavian. Waddell, meanwhile, objected to this, explaining that the language had been found to be from an Icelandic family that had originally come from Scotland. Due to this, Waddell used the word British in the title to emphasize where the Elder Edda had come from. Waddell also went on to state that many other Eddic poems had been written in the British Isles before and up to the 6th century, but that most of them had been eradicated in the 11th century by Christian missionaries, contributing to the confusion.

== Content ==
One of the subjects discussed in The British Edda is the "genesis of civilization", which, as stated by Waddell, was commonly believed in the "pagan days" in Britain to be in "Cappadocia and Eden", but was very broad due to the lack of knowledge about the region beyond mere stories and also no knowledge of specific place names. This oral tradition of stories was written down on "parchment by 'the Learned'", composed into what is known as the Elder Edda. Waddell also explained that other works that copied down the stories were made, but all of these had been destroyed by Christian missionaries in Britain, leaving only the one work. These stories returned to the common populace in the 12th century by being melded into the "Arthurian legends", while the original sources of Cappadocia, the Trojans, and Sumeria were lost.

== Legacy ==
Waddell's writings on the origins of civilization would soon after influence the poetry of Hugh MacDiarmid from 1937 on, impressing on him the belief that the "original impetus to civilization was an Ur-Gaelic initiative". This belief was later incorporated into his poems, such as in The Fingers of Baal Contract in the Communist Salute.

In two letters Charles Olson wrote to Frances Boldereff in July 1950, Olson discussed Waddell's works and specifically commented on The British Edda, stating that, in it, Waddell "dances all over this thing, like some damned witch doctor, trying to squeeze out the old and lost history", referring to the discussion in the book on how the Sumerians were the origination of civilization. The British Edda and one of Waddell's other works, The Makers of Civilization in Race and History, would go on to inspire Olson's essay titled "The Gate and the Center".
