= Shitala Mata Temple, Patna =

Hindu temple in India

Shitala Mata Temple
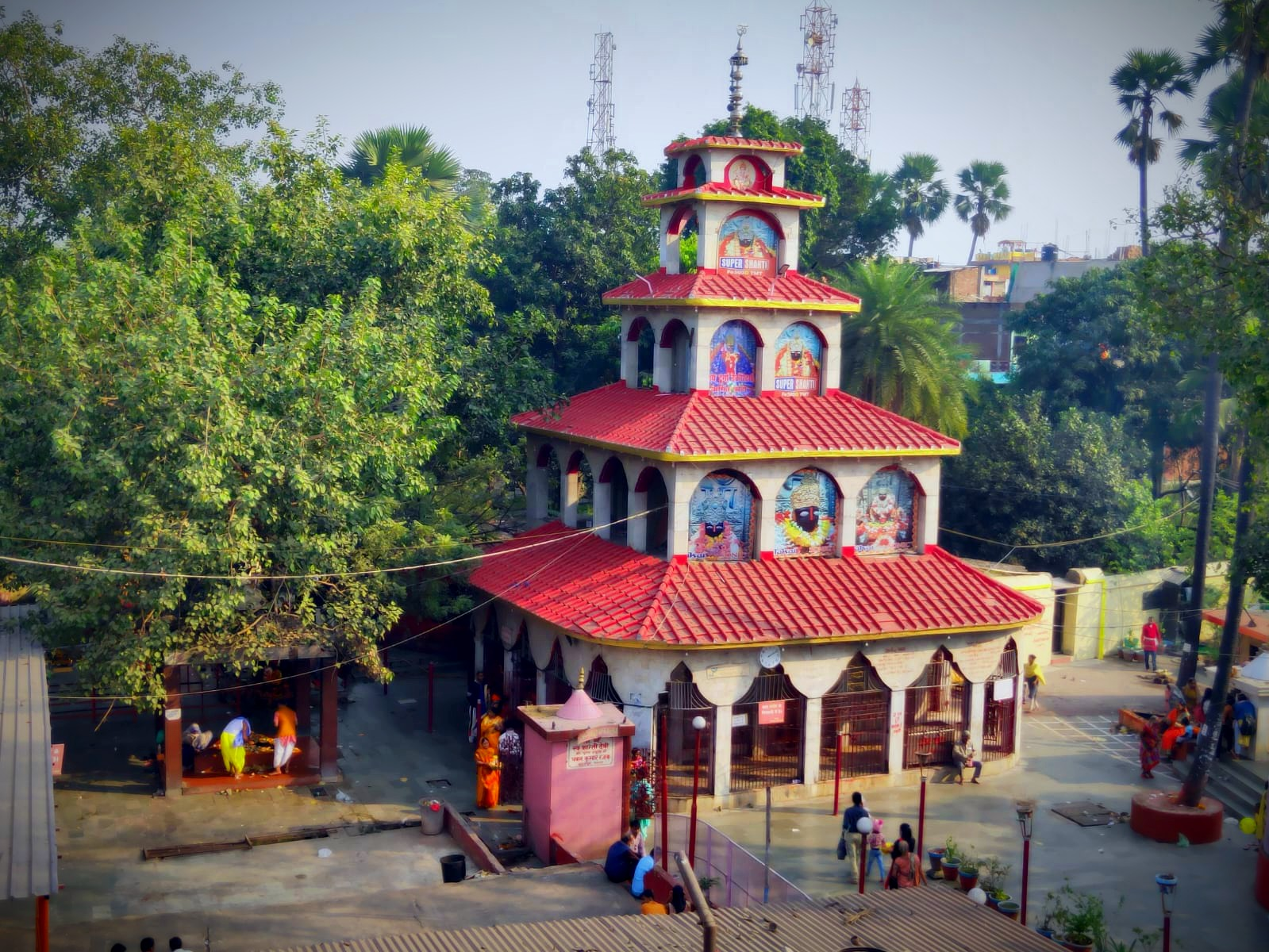

Religion
- Affiliation: Hinduism
- District: Patna
- Deity: Lord Shitala Mata

Location
- Location: Patna City
- State: Bihar
- Country: India
- Interactive map of Shitala Mata Temple

Website
- www.shitalamatatemple.com

Shitala Mata Mandir or Shitala Devi Mandir is a temple of Shitala Mata situated at Patna City, Patna in Bihar state of India. This is place for worship of Mata Durga also known as Shakta pitha of Maa Durga.
