= Kishore Kunal =

Indian author and police officer (1950–2024)

Acharya Kishore Kunal
- Born: 10 August 1950; Baruraj village, Muzaffarpur district, Bihar, India
- Died: 29 December 2024 (aged 74); Patna, Bihar, India
- Education: Patna University
- Notable work: Ayodhya Revisited by Kishore Kunal
- Spouse: Anita Kunal
- Children: 1
- Police career
- Country: India
- Service years: 1972-2000
- Rank: ADG
- Batch: 1972
- Cadre: Gujarat
- Awards: Padma Shri; PPMDS

Kishore Kunal (10 August 1950 – 29 December 2024), also known as Acharya Kunal, was a 1972 batch Indian Police Service (IPS) officer of Gujarat Cadre, from the state of Bihar, India. During his police career, he was appointed as the Officer on Special Duty (OSD) on the Ayodhya dispute by then Prime Minister V. P. Singh to mediate between the Vishva Hindu Parishad and the Babri Masjid Action Committee. He continued to serve in this position during the premierships of Chandra Sekhar and P. V. Narasimha Rao.

In 1998, under his leadership, Mahavir Mandir Trust started the Mahavir Cancer Institute & Research Centre (MCSRC), at Patna. The Trust runs nine hospitals including Mahavir Cancer Sansthan, Mahavir Aarogya Sansthan, Mahavir Vatsalya Aspatal, Mahavir Heart Hospital, Mahavir Netralaya, Mahavir Senior Citizen Hospital, Mahavir Vishalnath Hospital and Mahavir Hospice & Palliative Care. Kunal laid the foundation stone of India's first cancer hospital namely Mahavir Child Cancer Hospital on 12 December 2024, only 15 days before his death.

== Early life ==
Kishore Kunal was born on 10 August 1950 in a Bhumihar family. He had his schooling at Baruraj village in Muzaffarpur district. Then he studied History and Sanskrit at Patna University, graduating in 1970. Later, in the middle of his career, he also studied for master's degree, receiving it in 1983. His teachers included historians R. S. Sharma and D. N. Jha.

== Upliftment of Dalits and backward castes ==
Kunal is credited for appointment of priests from Dalit communities in Mahavir Mandir, Patna in 1993 and then temples all across Bihar while serving as the Administrator and President of Bihar Hindu Religious Trusts Board. He also worked to free the temple properties from illegal encroachment.

== Career ==
In 1972, Kunal became an officer of the Indian Police Service in the Gujarat cadre. His first posting was as the Superintendent of Police, at Anand. By 1978, he rose to become the Deputy Commissioner of Police of Ahmedabad.

After completion of his Master's in 1983, Kunal was appointed the Senior Superintendent of Police at Patna. In 2001, Kunal resigned from the Indian Police Service voluntarily. After retirement, he served as the chairman of the Bihar State Board of Religious Trusts. Kunal was also secretary of the Mahavir Temple Trust, Patna, and previously of Mahavir Arogya Sansthan, in which he was involved with the improvement of healthcare for the poor. He also founded Gyan Niketan school in Patna.

=== Ayodhya dispute ===
The Government of V. P. Singh established an 'Ayodhya Cell' in 1990 under the leadership of the Minister of State for Home Affairs for handling the Ayodhya dispute. Kunal was appointed an 'Officer on Special Duty' to assist in its functioning. The cell continued under the Government of Chandra Sekhar (November 1990–March 1991), during which time Rajiv Gandhi suggested that historical and archaeological evidence should be taken into consideration for deciding the Ayodhya issue. The representatives of the Vishva Hindu Parishad (VHP) and the Babri Masjid Action Committee (BMAC) met under the banner of the Ayodhya Cell, and decided to exchange their respective evidence. Kunal stated that he had forwarded the submitted evidence to the Chairman of the Indian Council of Historical Research (ICHR), the Director General of the Archaeological Survey of India (ASI) and the Director General of Archives for verification and submitting reports. Both VHP and BMAC had also nominated ten experts each to examine the evidence. The four key historians nominated by the BMAC, R. S. Sharma, Suraj Bhan, M. Athar Ali and D. N. Jha, asked for six weeks to examine the VHP's evidence. The VHP did not agree to the demand. The negotiations ended after this.

Kunal later published his own analysis of the evidence submitted by the parties, and other evidence that he unearthed on his own, under the title Ayodhya Revisited.

== Death ==
On 29 December 2024, Kunal suffered a cardiac arrest while being admitted for minor issues related to cold and cough at the Mahavir Vaatsalya Hospital in Patna. He died early morning at the age of 74.

== Social service ==
=== Mahavir Temple ===
Kunal was secretary of the Mahavir mandir, Patna. Under his secretaryship, renovation work of Mahavir Temple started on 30 October 1983, and it was inaugurated on 4 March 1985. Governor R S Gavai on Monday said Mahavir Temple is an ideal religious trust, and it should be emulated by other trusts in the country. Mahavir Trust later set up Mahavir Cancer Sansthan and eight other hospitals. The temple has established hospitals and provides financial help to the needy people.

=== Mundeshwari Bhawani Mandir ===
He was involved in the uplift of Mundeshwari Bhawani Mandir, the 'oldest' surviving temple in the eastern region belonging to Gupta Age (AD 343) and located in Kaimur hills. The temple site will also be developed into a full-fledged pilgrim center, just like Vaishno Devi temple, with a number of amenities like dormitory, restrooms, kitchens and efficient transportation system. As part of the temple's development plans, a 'vivah' mandap is under construction in over two-and-a-half acres. He was penning a historical novel titled Mahima Mundeshwari Maa Ki. Recently, a 185-page book 'Mundeshwari Mandir: The Oldest Recorded Temple in the Country', also written by him, was released.

=== Viraat Ramayan Temple ===
Under his leadership as the Secretary, Bihar Mahavir Mandir Trust (BMMT), he has spearheaded building the biggest temple in the world. He said, "they will build a bigger temple in Bihar's East champaran district than the 12th-century Angkor Wat temple in Cambodia."

=== Ram Rasoi ===
Under the leadership of Kunal, Mahavir Mandir Trust runs a community kitchen namely Ram Rasoi in Ayodhya which feeds pure Bihari food twice a day to approximately 10,000 pilgrims every day without accepting any donation.

== Awards ==
Kunal posthumously won Padma Shri in 2025 for his works in Civil Service.

In 2008, he received the Bhagwaan Mahaveer Award for his contribution to community and social services. The award, presented to Kunal by the President of India Pratibha Patil, is instituted by the Bhagwan Mahaveer Foundation, Chennai. Acharya Kunal is the first individual from Bihar-Jharkhand to get this award. His selection was made by a jury headed by Justice Shri M. N. Venkatachaliah, former Chief Justice of India.

== Works ==
Kunal authored 18 books in total and had just finished his last book on Ramayana which is yet to be published. He is also author of Dalit Devo Bhava, which examines the original proofs of regional languages and Hindi literature and on the basis of new interpretations. It tries to prove that in order to give Dalits an equal place in society, every part of the country and in the past, visionary sages have taken meaningful initiatives.

- Ayodhya Revisited (Prabhat Prakashan, 2016). ISBN 8184303572.

In this 800-page book, Kunal analysed the historical documents to draw the conclusion that the Babri Masjid was built by Emperor Aurangzeb, not Babur. He blamed the British East India Company surveyor Francis Buchanan for erroneously crediting Babur. Kunal also stated that a Ram temple existed at the disputed site which was demolished by Aurangzeb's governor Fedai Khan in 1660 AD. Reviewer Kuldeep Kumar has remarked that the book deserves a close reading by professional historians.

Kunal submitted evidence to the Supreme Court of India in Ayodhya dispute presenting his analysis.

== Bibliography ==
- Jain, Meenakshi (2013), Rama and Ayodhya, New Delhi: Aryan Books, ISBN 978-8173054518
- Jain, Meenakshi (2017), The Battle for Rama, New Delhi: Aryan Books, ISBN 978-81-7305-579-9
- Kunal, Kishore (2016), Ayodhya Revisited, Prabhat Prakashan, pp. 335–, ISBN 978-81-8430-357-5
