= Mahavir Mandir =

Hindu temple in Patna, India

- Hanuman Mandir
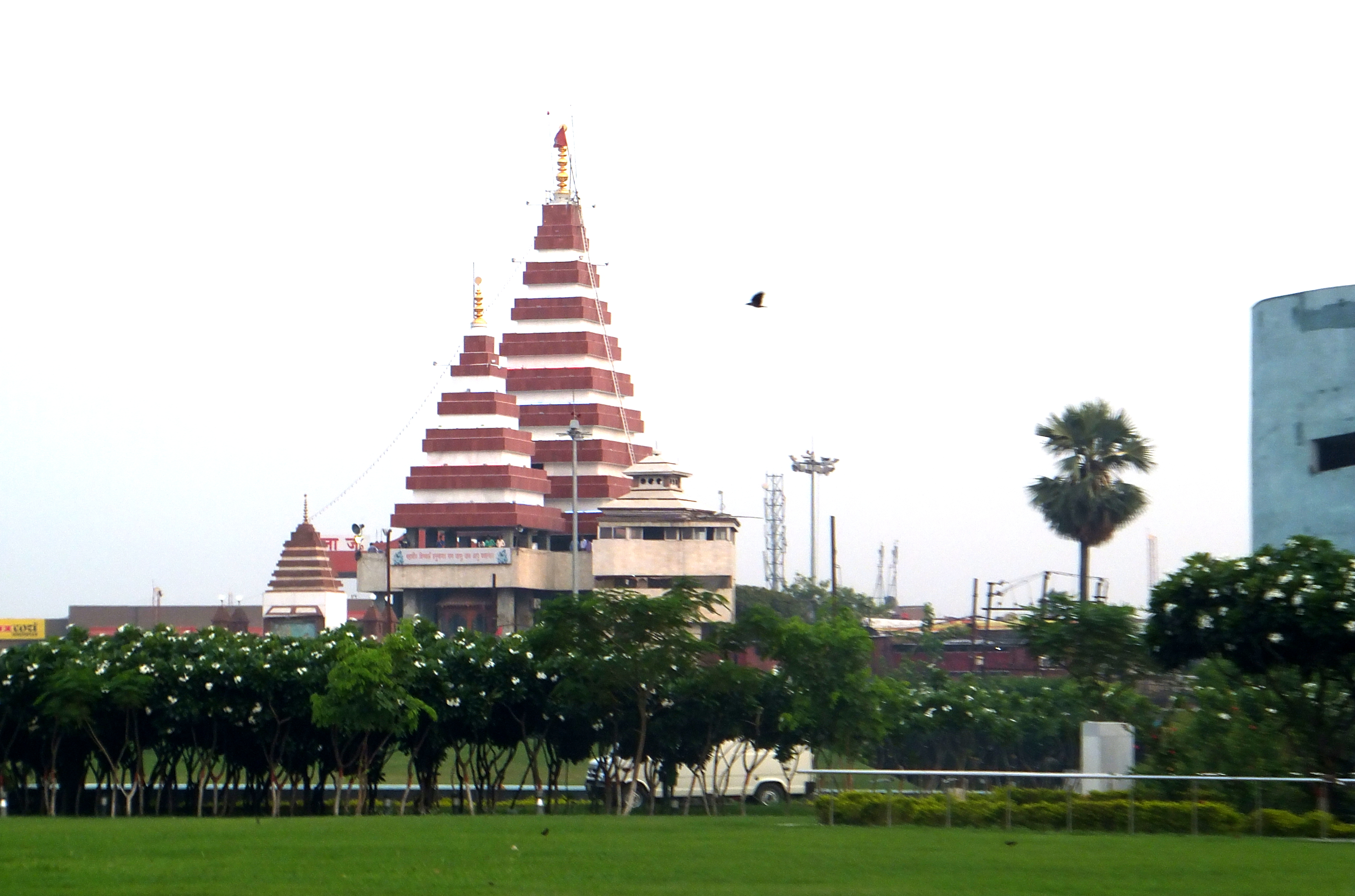

- Location in Patna

Religion
- Affiliation: Hinduism
- Deity: Hanuman
- Festivals: Rama Navami, Hanuman Jayanti

Location
- Location: Patna
- State: Bihar
- Country: India
- Coordinates: 25°36′14″N 85°8′11″E

Architecture
- Type: Nagara Architecture
- Completed: First built – unknown Rebuilt – 1947; Final Rebuilt – 1987
- Elevation: 57 m (187 ft)

Website
- mahavirmandirpatna.org

Mahavir Mandir is a Hindu temple dedicated to the god Hanuman, located in Patna, Bihar, India. Millions of pilgrims visit the temple every year. Acharya Kishore Kunal is the secretary of the Mahavir Mandir Temple Trust, Patna. After the Vaishno Devi Temple, this temple has earnings of over 100,000 per day, rendering its trust budget the second highest in northern India. The temple attracts huge crowds on festivals like Rama Navami. It is one of the leading temples dedicated to the worship of Lord Hanuman.

== History ==
As per a Patna High Court judgment in 1948, the temple has existed since time immemorial. However, historical facts and traditions indicate that the temple was originally established by Swami Balanand, an ascetic of the Ramanandi sect, around 1730 CE. The temple gained popularity in 1947 with a large number of Hindu refugees coming to Patna after the partition of India. Subsequently, the temple was rebuilt as a concrete structure, which was demolished in 1987 to construct a large marble temple. The idol of Sankat-Mochan, an avatar of Hanuman, is housed within it.

== Visits ==
Long, winding queues can be seen at the temple on Saturdays and Tuesdays, the traditional days of worship for Hanuman. Thousands of people visit Mahavir Mandir during every Rama Navami and New Year celebration. On Rama Navami, the queues can exceed one kilometer in length.

== Dalit Priest ==
Since 13 June 1993, Suryavanshi Das, a member of the Dalit community, has served as a priest of the temple. This decision received support from three well-known priests: Ramchandra Paramahans, Mahant Avaidyanath of Baba Gorakhnath Dham, and Mahant Avadh Kishore Das.

== Ram Rasoi ==
Free food arrangements have been established for devotees visiting Ram Lala at Ram Rasoi. Acharya Kishore Kunal, secretary of the Shri Mahavir Sthan Nyas Samiti, initiated the service on Sunday, 1 December 2019. This free food facility operates in the Amava temple just outside the temple of Ram Lala, at the Amawa Mandir Complex, Ramkot, Ayodhya. Devotees who visit Ram Lala at Ram Rasoi receive free meals daily between 11:30 am and 3:00 pm.
For this initiative, 60 quintals of Govind Bhog rice have been sent to Ayodhya. The rice has been sourced from Mokri village in Kaimur district, Bihar. The services of Shri Ram's kitchen and Shri Ram Lala's bhog function continuously. An initial arrangement has been made to feed one thousand people daily, with plans to expand based on devotee turnout.

== Philanthropic work by Shri Mahavir Sthan Nyas Samiti ==
The Mahavir Mandir Trust is officially named Shri Mahavir Sthan Nyas Samiti (श्री महावीर स्थान न्यास समिति). Headed by Acharya Kishore Kunal, the trust monitors the operations and development of the temple. The trust uses temple funds to run human welfare organizations and hospitals, such as the Mahavir Cancer Institute & Research Centre, Mahavir Vaatsalya Hospital, Mahavir Arogya Hospital, and several other medical and orphanage facilities across the rural state of Bihar. The Mahavir Mandir Trust has the second-highest budget in North India, following the Maa Vaishno Devi shrine.

== Publications ==
The temple began publishing Dharmayan, a magazine focusing on culture, religion, and nationality, in 1990. Since then, the magazine has remained in continuous publication, recently celebrating a milestone with its 100th issue. Dignitaries such as Acharya Sitaram Chaturvedi, Sahitya Vachaspati Shriranjan Suridev, and Dr. Kashinath Mishra have been associated with this esteemed magazine. Currently, Acharya Kishore Kunal serves as the Chief Editor, and it is edited by Pandit Bhavanath Jha.

== See also ==
- Viraat Ramayan Mandir
- Deo Sun Temple
- Baba Garib Sthan Mandir
